= Alcohol in Malaysia =

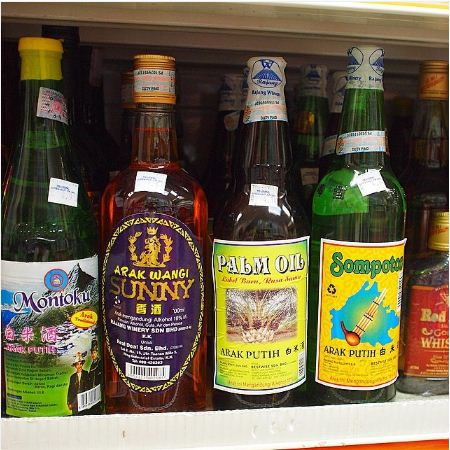
Local brands of arak putih in a market in Sabah

Alcohol in Malaysia refers to the consumption, industry and laws of alcohol in the Southeast Asian country of Malaysia. Although Malaysia is a Muslim-majority country, the country permits the selling of alcohol to non-Muslims. There are no nationwide alcohol bans being enforced in the country, with the exception of Kelantan and Terengganu which is only for Muslims. The Islamic party respects the rights of non-Muslims and non-Muslim establishments like Chinese restaurants and grocery shops are excluded from such bans. The federal territory of Kuala Lumpur has the highest alcohol consumption in the country, followed by the states of Sarawak in second place and Sabah in third place, according to a 2012 survey.

Based on a report released by International Organisation of Good Templars in 2016, Malaysia has the third highest tax on alcohol worldwide at 15%, behind Norway and Singapore which are predicted to keep increasing. The country has an annual spending of RM2 billion on alcoholic drinks. Prior to the Trans-Pacific Partnership, Malaysia together with Vietnam plans to drop import tariffs on beer, whisky, and other alcoholic drinks.

== History and tradition ==
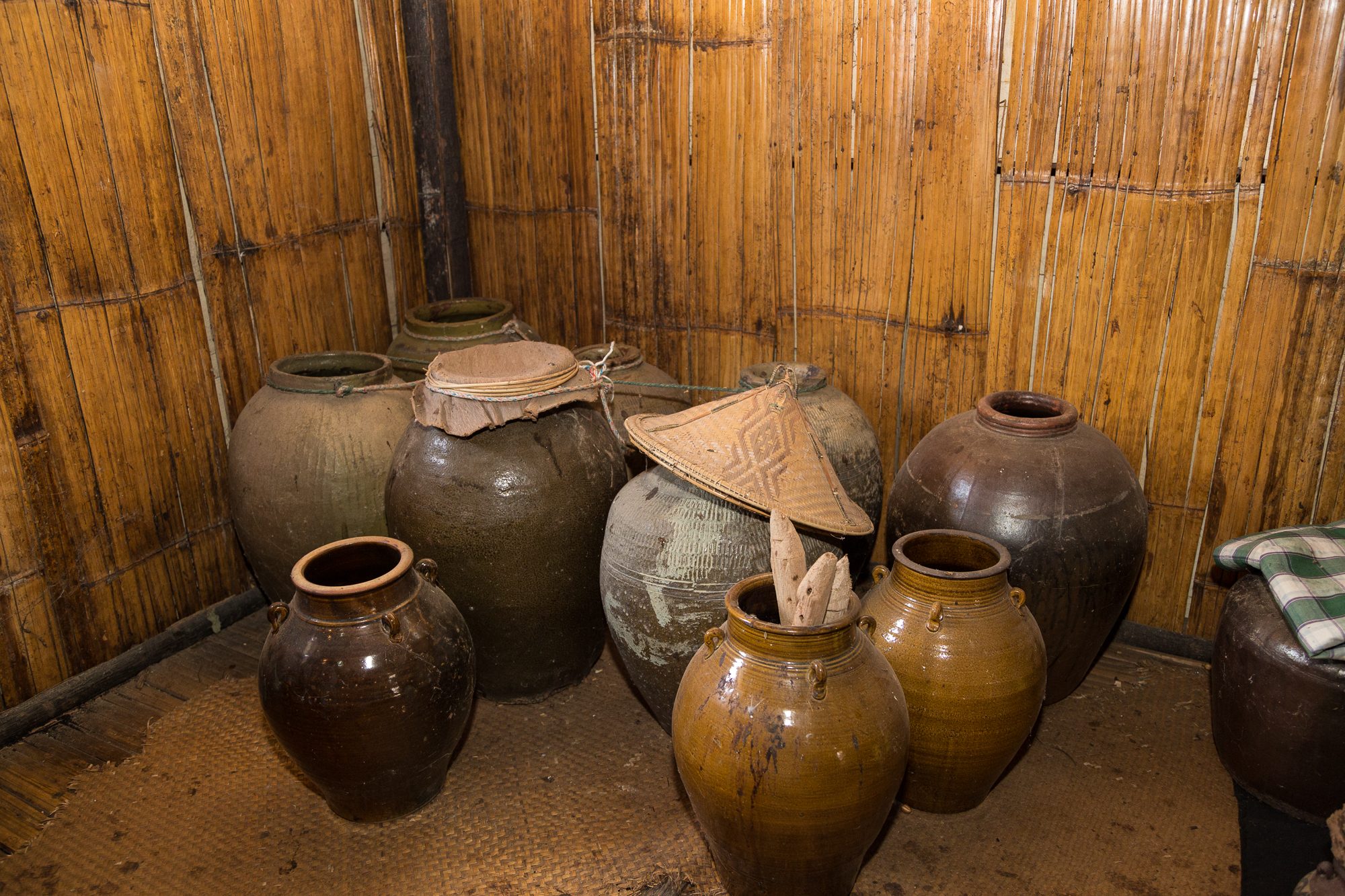
Jars for the making of the traditional rice wine of tapai in Sabah.

The tradition of brewing alcoholic drinks in Malaysia is most prominent in the island of Borneo. Indigenous islanders traditionally drank home-made palm wine such as bahar as well as rice wine called langkau, lihing, montoku, tapai and tuak in their communal gatherings and harvest festivals of Gawai Dayak and Kaamatan. Alcohol consumption in the Malay Peninsula has been less common since the introduction of Islam. However, the production and consumption of alcohol (arak) has been a tradition since the time of Hang Tuah in the 15th century. In the 20th century, palm toddy was popular among the local Indian and Chinese communities. The Chinese also made samsu rice wine. The British brought their own traditional brewed alcoholic drinks, such as beer and stout. In the 1930, the first brewery was established in neighbouring British Singapore.

== Industry and products ==
=== Beer ===
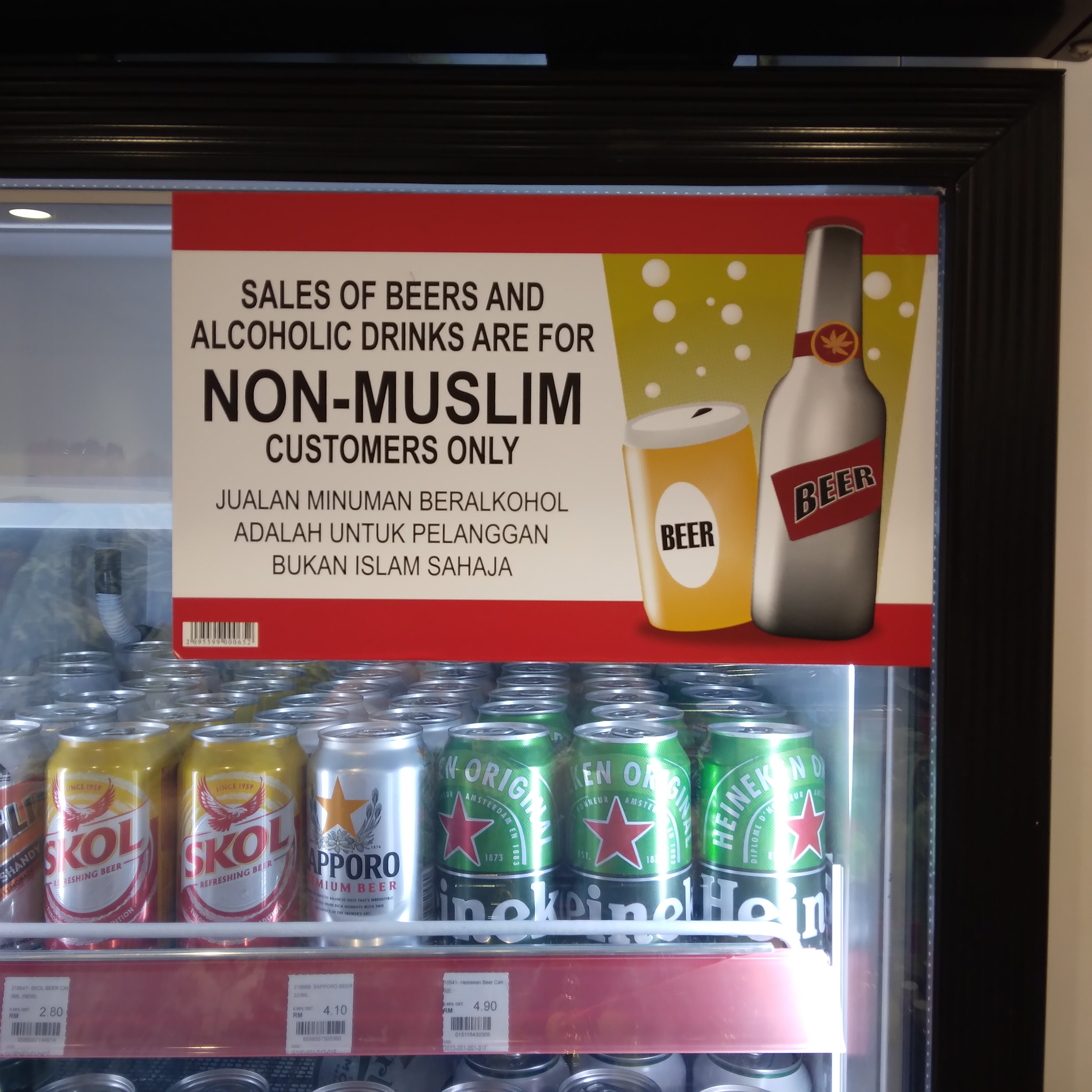
Sign on a refrigerator on Langkawi Island notifying that sales of beer are for non-Muslim customers only

Since the British colonial times, Tiger Beer was the first commercial beer brewed in 1932 by Malayan Breweries Limited, a Singapore-based brewery which was formed from a merger between Heineken and Fraser and Neave (F&N). The beginning of alcohol production in Malaysia started in 1968, when two leading breweries, Guinness and Malayan, merged to form a new company known as Guinness Anchor Berhad. In 1970, Carlsberg established its first brewery outside Kuala Lumpur in Shah Alam. Both are since the only legal commercial breweries in Malaysia, which account for 95% of the total beer and stout volume in the country market. In 2007, another two breweries known as Napex and Jaz brewed beer for pubs in the country, but both have since ceased from operation. Beside local productions, many alcoholic drinks in the country are also imported from neighbouring countries such as Singapore, Thailand, Indonesia, Philippines and Vietnam.

=== Tuak ===
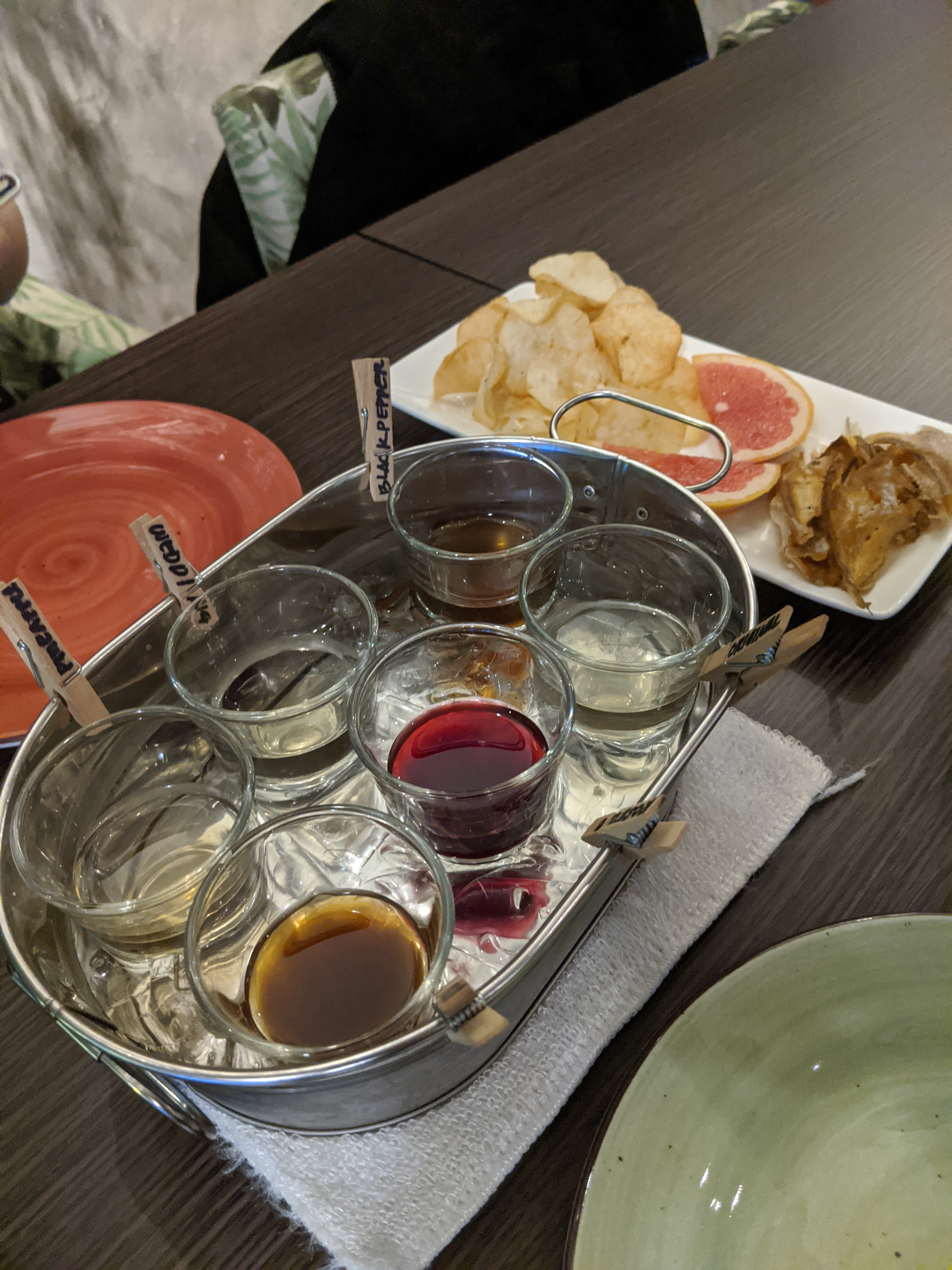
A tasting flight of six different varieties of tuak, served with traditional snacks

Tuak (Dayak), also known as lihing (Kadazan-Dusun) or tapai (Malay), is a rice wine made from fermented rice and yeast, with an alcohol content between 5% and 20%. It is common in Borneo and particularly important for the Dayak people.

=== Arak putih ===
Arak putih, Malay for "white liquor", is a generic term for locally produced distilled liquor (arrack). While sometimes mistranslated as white wine, the drink is typically much stronger than wine (up to 60%) and is not made from grapes.

== Regulation ==
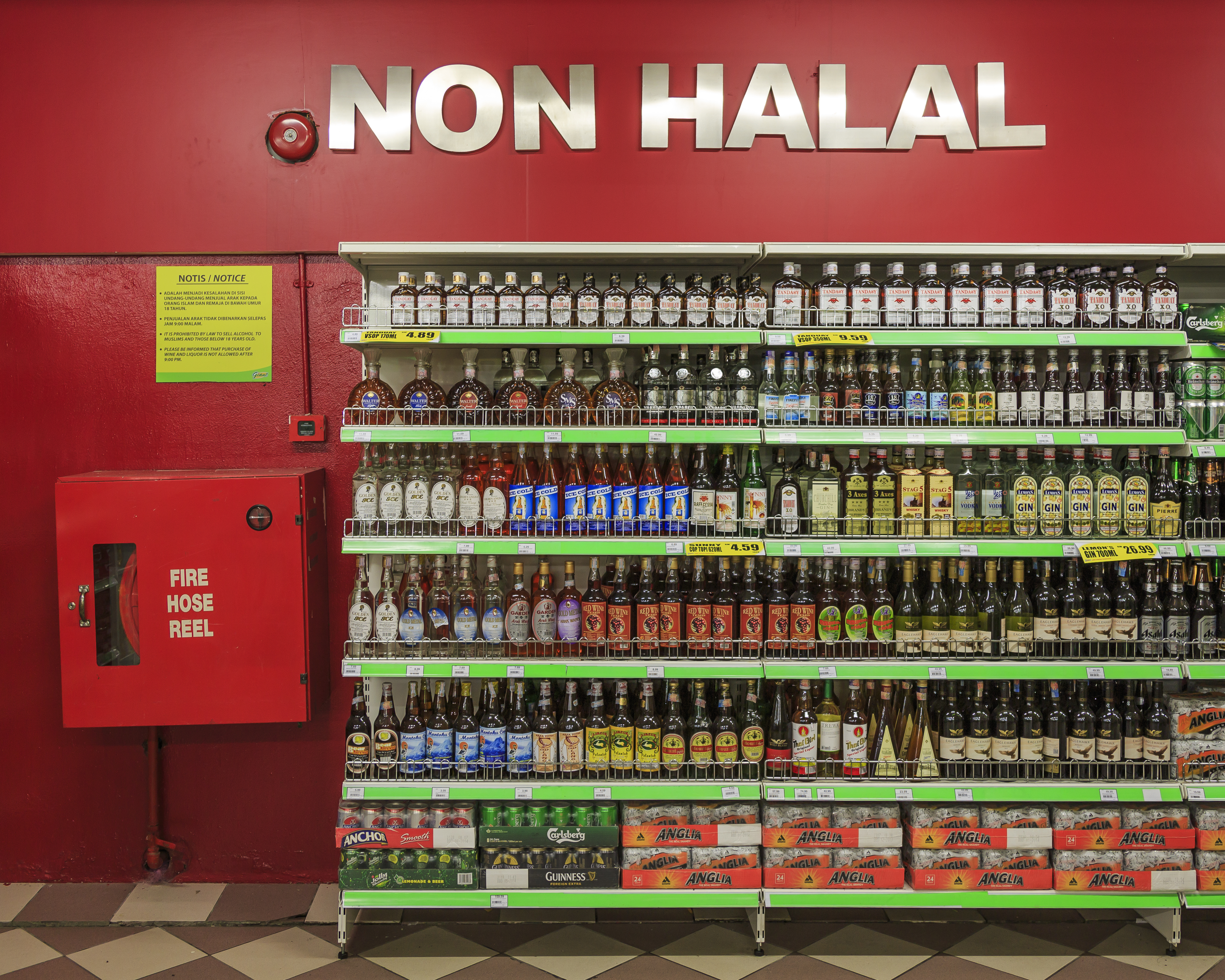
Alcoholic drinks being put in a separate storage places with a label "non-halal" in the Giant Supermarket of Sabah.

The legal drinking age (purchasing) for Malaysia is 21 years old and above. In both Sabah and Sarawak of East Malaysia, it is legal for indigenous persons to sell their native alcoholic drinks without a licence, as both lihing and tuak are classified as undistilled liquor, though they may need proper licences when extending the sale to each other's states as well as to West Malaysia. Since 2020, the legal limit for blood alcohol level while driving in Malaysia is 50 mg per 100 ml for blood test; 22 μg per 100 ml for breath test; and 67 mg per 100 ml for urine test.

Public drinking or public intoxication is not a crime in Malaysia, unless the drunken person caused "annoyance" towards others or exhibit "disorderly behaviour", which may be punished with a RM20 to RM25 fine or a 10 to 14 days jail under the Penal Code or Minor Offences Act 1955. However, these laws are rarely enforced.

Any vendors, restaurants and retailers need a licence to serve or sell tap/draft beers, liquor and spirits in the country. Bottled and canned beers are exempted from such licence requirements, which is why it is common to find many vendors and coffee houses serving alcohol in their premises without a licence. Malaysia also imposes nationwide regulations for vendors to place their alcoholic drinks into separate refrigerators or storage places, although this was opposed by certain vendors in the state of Penang. The high tax on alcohol has increased the price of alcoholic drinks in Malaysia, harming some drinkers who turn to unsafe alcohol smuggled in from neighbouring countries. In 2018, around 45 people died in the country's worst methanol poisoning involving foreign workers and several Malaysians due to the consumption of cheap fake liquors acquired from the country's black markets.

Following Demerit Points System for Traffic Offences (KEJARA), a police officer or JPJ officer can take breath, blood or urine samples of drunk driver. If alcohol content is found in the samples, a fine of RM 2000 or 6 months' imprisonment may be imposed for the first offence.

Alcohol is generally prohibited for Muslim consumers in the country as Malaysia's sharia law forbids Muslims from drinking alcohol. Alcohol is mostly banned for Muslims in the states of Kelantan and Terengganu.

== See also ==
- Alcohol in Australia
- Alcohol in Indonesia
- Alcohol in New Zealand
- Malaysian cuisine
- Islamic dietary laws
