= Tuak =

Traditional palm or rice wine of Indonesia and Malaysia

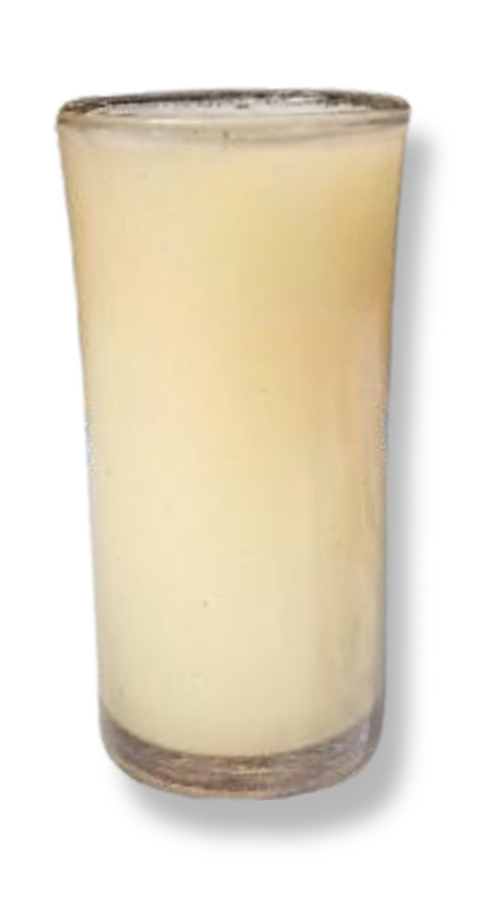
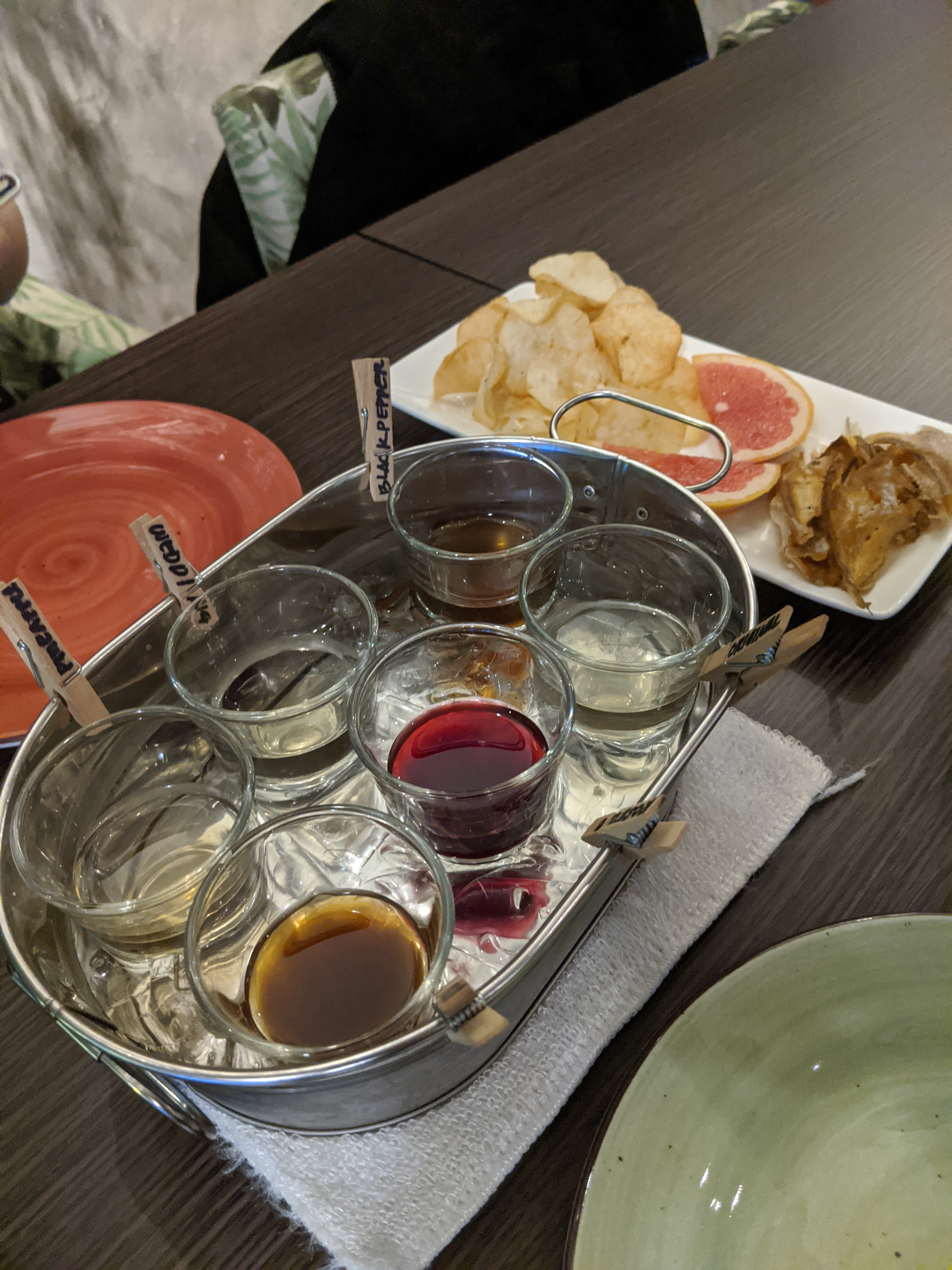
- (Left) Batak tuak made from arenga pinnata (Right) Iban tuak made from glutinous rice
- Type: Palm wine and rice wine
- Other names: too-ack, tuaq, tuvak, or twak
- Origin: Brunei, Indonesia, and Malaysia, (Borneo, Java, Lesser Sunda Islands, Maluku Islands, Sumatra, and Sulawesi)
- Alcohol by volume: 4% to 5% (palm tuak); 11% to 18% (rice tuak)
- Colour: From milky white or cloudy to clear, golden yellow, amber, and deep red or brown
- Flavour: Sweet, fizzy, and tangy (palm tuak); Sweet, tangy, and rice-forward (rice tuak)
- Ingredients: Fresh palm sap (either aren (arenga pinnata), nipah (nypa fruticans) or siwalan (borassus flabellifer), natural wild yeasts, enhanced with raru bark (dipterocarpaceae) or local roots (palm tuak); Glutinous rice, ragi (a traditional starter base that contains bacterial enzymes and yeast), water and sugar (optional) (rice tuak)
- Related products: bahar, lihing, and tapai (Sabah), saguer (Maluku Islands and New Guinea)

Tuak refers to two types of a fermented sugars-based alcoholic beverage: either made of palm sap and sugar in parts of islands Java, Borneo, Lesser Sunda Islands, Moluccas, Sumatra, and Sulawesi across Maritime Southeast Asia; or made of glutinous rice, ragi, water and sugar in parts of inland Borneo including East Malaysia, as well as Brunei. The palm tuak is a popular drink among the Bataks of North Sumatra, while the rice tuak is popular among the Ibans and other Dayaks of Kalimantan and Sarawak, especially during the Gawai Dayak festivals, weddings, hosting of guests and other special occasions.

In 2012, it was listed as an intangible cultural heritage of Malaysia in the category of National Heritage Drink under the Department of National Heritage. In 2025, it was gazetted among the 117 local Malaysian food and drinks of national heritage under the Declaration of Heritage Objects.

== Etymology ==
The term tuak originates from the Proto-Austronesian root tuak, which carries the meaning of a "fermented alcoholic beverage extracted from palm trees". Across Southeast Asia, the term shares a deep linguistic lineage across Western Malayo-Polynesian languages, historically denoting sweet palm sap or palm wine before evolving to describe various localised brews like Bornean rice wine.

An early attested form is the Old Javanese twak in a stone inscription dated to 902 CE dedicated to a feast in presence of Balitung, which it was among many beverages served along with dishes before the king.

== Background and history ==
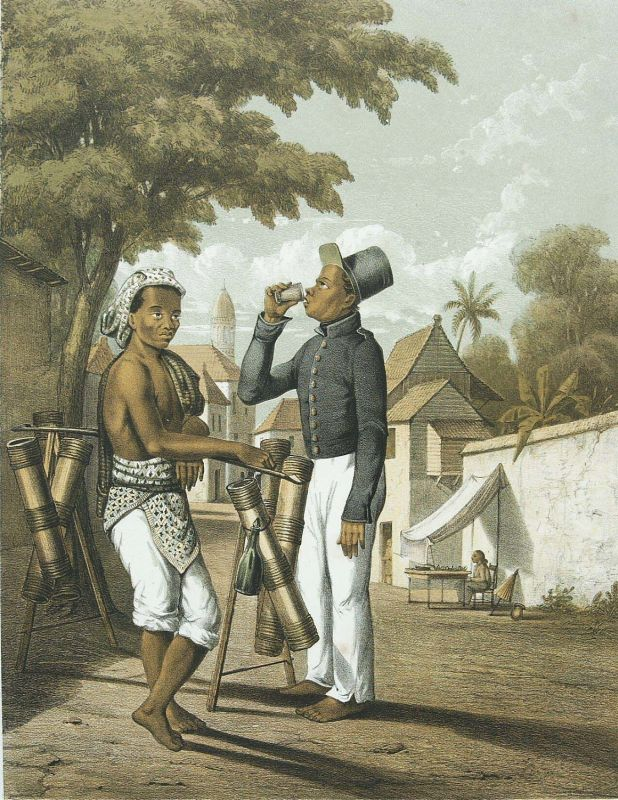
Lithograph of a tuak vendor and a native Royal Netherlands East Indies Army (KNIL) serviceman consuming the drink, c. 1854

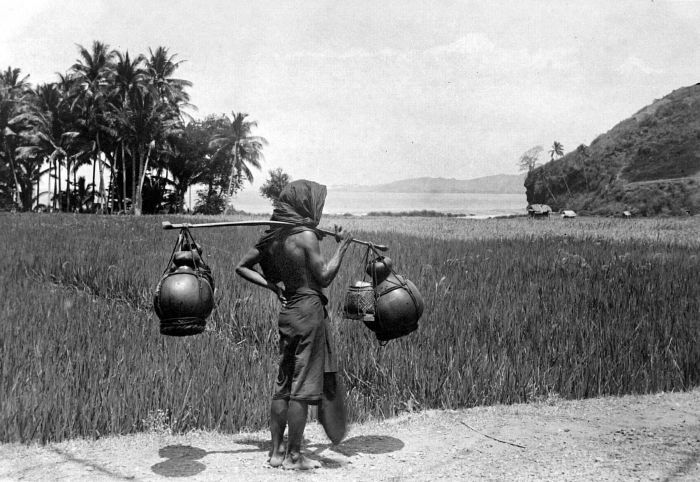
Palm wine seller in Bali, Dutch East Indies, c. 1929

Textual records and ethnographic evidence records show tuak has been drunk in Southeast Asia for centuries and may have been introduced by Austronesian settlers to parts of South Asia, Indian Ocean islands, and Madagascar in the 7th century. The Old Book of Tang (Chiu Tang Shu) recorded the consumption of tuak within Southeast Asian indigenous through the visit by the Chinese during the Tang dynasty. All types of tuak are locally produced by the indigenous community through the fermentation of plant materials most readily available in their respective regions. The drink serve as the basis for the production of stronger alcoholic beverages, in which case it is distilled. Tuak has historically been produced in almost all Southeast Asian islands encompassing modern Indonesia and Malaysia to the easternmost, and, to a lesser extent, the Malay Peninsula of the mainland. Despite the diversity of recipes and preparation, the two main types of the drink known as tuak are a light one (usually no more than 5% alcohol) which is made from palm sap, and a relatively stronger one (12–15% alcohol), produced primarily from rice.

In some areas, particularly in Java and Bali, both rice and palm tuak are produced, while in other localities only one type is produced. The most famous region specialising in palm tuak is North Sumatra, where it has become a local drink symbol and extremely popular among the Batak there. Rice tuak is equally popular in both Indonesian and Malaysian sides of Borneo as the main common alcoholic drink for most Dayak peoples, especially among the Iban. In Sarawak, based on historical records and a 1979 book titled "Drunk Before Dawn" written by Shirley Lees, traditionally, the Lun Bawang are the predominant producers and consumers of tuak among the various indigenous ethnic groups; however, Christian missionaries who came to the Raj of Sarawak identified an issue when the locals opted to devote their weekends to drinking instead of attending church or engaging in labour. The early 20th-century missionaries played a significant role in transforming the Lun Bawangs from being drunk "100 out of 365 days" while also indirectly causing the knowledge of tuak-brewing among the community to nearly disappeared. Presently, the Ibans, Bidayuh and Orang Ulus became the biggest producers of local Sarawakian tuak. In 2026, the annual Borneo Tuak Festival showcased around 100 tuak varieties from 40 local Sarawakian makers. In Brunei, tuak is also consumed among local Dusun and Iban communities.

== Regional variations of tuak ==
The two main types of tuak are made from either palm sap or rice:

=== Palm tuak ===
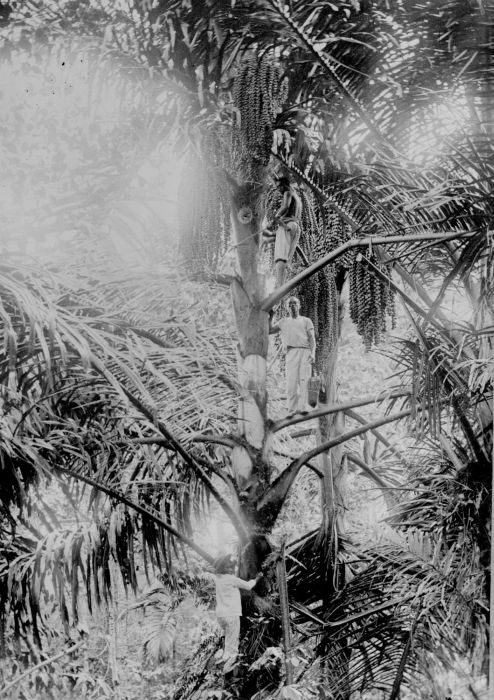
Tapping the "arènpalm" (Arenga pinnata), one of the palms used to make palm wine, in Ambon, Moluccas, c. 1919

This type of tuak is actually a variety of palm wine and is made by fermenting the sap obtained by tapping the male flowers of various palm species, most commonly the feather palm (Arenga pinnata). The fermentation process can occur naturally—a container of palm sap is simply left in the heat—or it can be stimulated by adding yeast (among the Batak of northern Sumatra, the raru bark (dipterocarpaceae species) are primarily used for this purpose).

=== Rice tuak ===
This type of tuak is made from cooked glutinous rice, ragi (a traditional starter base that contains bacterial enzymes and yeast), water, and sugar (optional). The addition of sugar not only make the tuak sweeter, but also to increase the volume for the yeast to thrive. The fermentation process typically lasts 2–3 days, after which the tuak is considered ready. The strength of the resulting drink is usually no more than 4–5%, which is why it is sometimes called palm beer. The rice tuak is popular among the Dayaks of Kalimantan and especially in Sarawak among the Ibans. In many areas of North Sumatra, a single subsequent distillation is common; the alcohol content of the resulting "strong tuak" can range from 20 to 35%. In Bali, an even stronger drink, can containing up to 50% alcohol, is prepared from tuak.

== The use and social significance of tuak ==
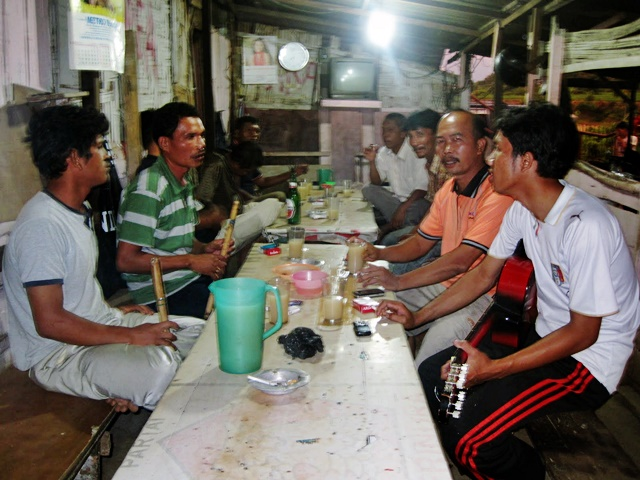
Lapo tuak is a traditional drinking establishment in North Sumatra, Indonesia

The culture of tuak consumption in various regions of Indonesia and Malaysia has its own specific features. Traditionally, it is especially popular in Borneo (rice tuak) and North Sumatra (palm tuak). In both regions, it has almost a cult significance: local residents consume this drink regularly, it serves as an integral attribute of traditional holidays and, often, religious ceremonies. Its production and distribution are carried out completely openly and, moreover, are sometimes presented as a local attraction to attract tourists. In both Sarawak and Sabah of East Malaysia, it is legal for indigenous persons to sell their native alcoholic drinks without a licence, as both tuak and lihing are classified as undistilled liquor, though they may need proper licences when extending the sale to each other's states as well as to West Malaysia. In North Sumatra, traditional drinking establishments selling tuak (Indonesian: lapo tuak) are found everywhere including in large city such as Medan.

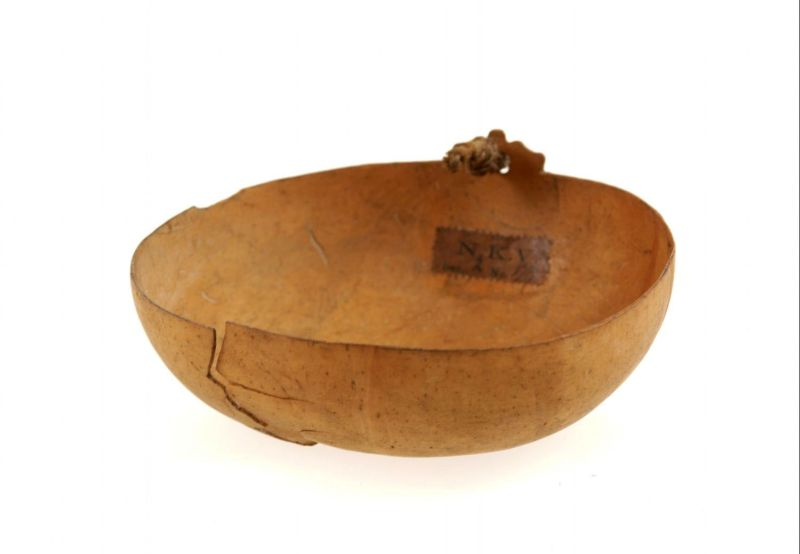
Bowl for tuak drinking made from a gourd, late 19th century

In most other regions of Indonesia, tuak was also historically widespread, but with the socio-economic development of these regions in the last decades of the 20th century, it became marginalised: currently, tuak is a drink of the poorest segments of the population, who do not have access to industrially produced alcoholic beverages. In Indonesia, control over the production of tuak is carried out in accordance with local legislation: in most provinces, the production of its low-alcohol varieties remains legal, but stronger varieties are prohibited (the "threshold" level of strength can vary not only in different provinces, but also in different districts of the same province). Sanctions can also be applied to producers who violate sanitary and hygienic standards; police raids and searches are conducted in tuak production areas to identify violators.

== See also ==
- Alcohol in Indonesia
- Alcohol in Malaysia
- List of alcoholic drinks
- List of Indonesian drinks
- List of Malaysian drinks
- Bahar (drink) – Traditional palm wine of the Dusun from Sabah, Malaysia
- Langkau – Traditional rice wine of the Dayak and Iban from Sarawak, Malaysia
- Lihing – Traditional rice wine of the Kadazan-Dusun from Sabah, Malaysia
- Montoku (drink) – Traditional rice wine of the Kadazan-Dusun and Rungus from Sabah, Malaysia
- Tapai (drink) – Traditional fermented preparation of starchy foods in Asia
