= Lihing =

Traditional rice wine of the Kadazan-Dusun from Sabah, Malaysia

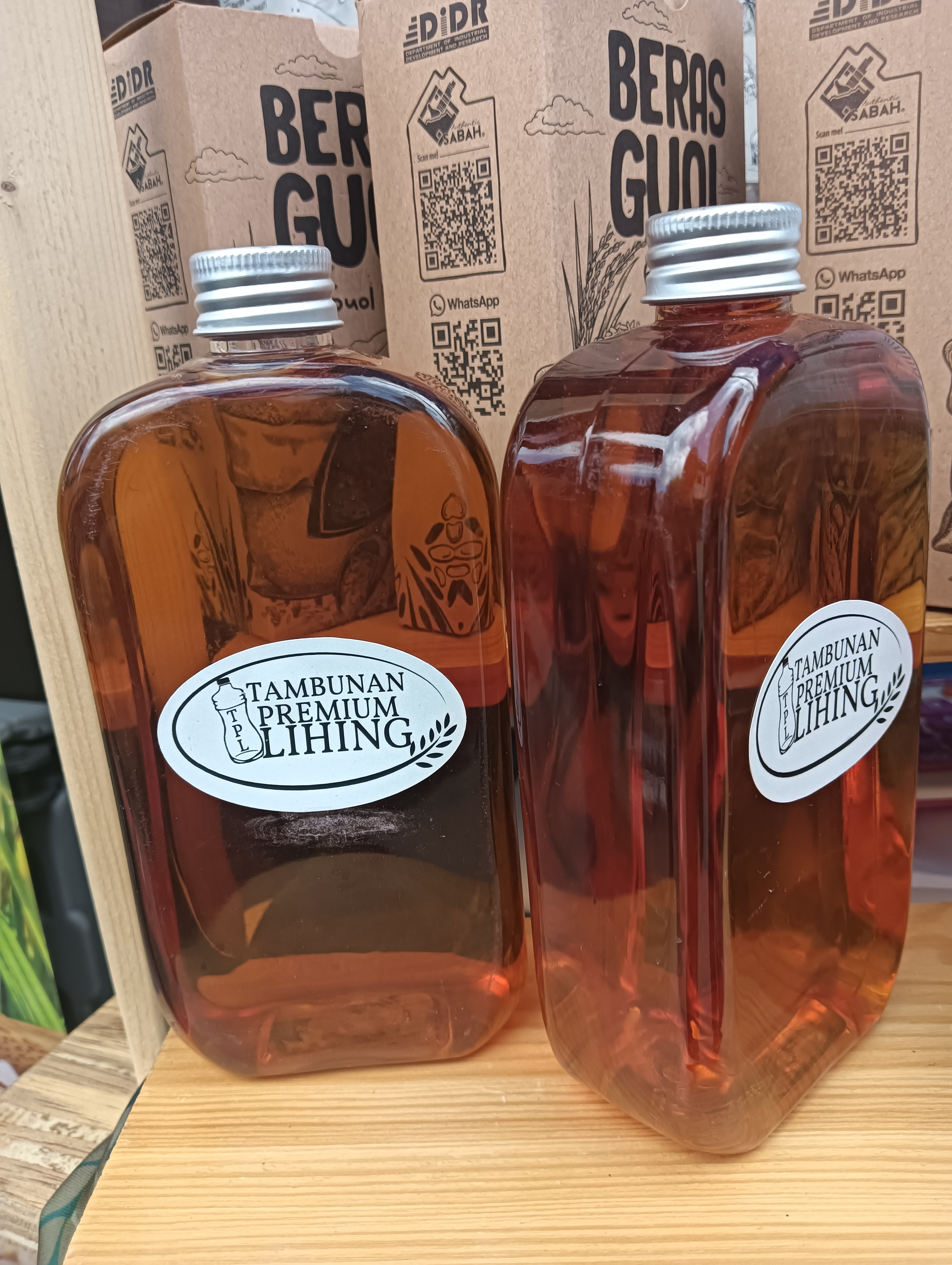
- A commercially bottled lihing from the Tambunan District of Sabah, Malaysia
- Type: Rice wine
- Other name(s): hiing, kinomol, kinopi, linahas, and sagantang
- Distributor: Borneo Trading Post, Lihing Nilyn
- Origin: Sabah, Malaysia, (Interior Division, West Coast Division)
- Alcohol by volume: 13% to 21%
- Colour: Yellow
- Flavour: Sweet
- Ingredients: Glutinous rice, sasad (yeast)
- Variants: hiing, kinarung, kinomol, kinopi, linahas, sagantang, as well as tapai
- Related products: bahar, montoku and tapai (Sabah), langkau and tuak (Sarawak, Kalimantan, Java, and Sumatra), saguer (Maluku Islands and New Guinea)

Lihing is a type of Malaysian rice wine that originates from the state of Sabah. It is made from "pulut", a glutinous rice, and is a traditional rice wine for the Kadazan-Dusun people, especially among the Kadazan of Penampang District. The rice wine is also referred as hiing (in certain Dusun dialects), kinarung, kinomol, kinopi, linahas, sagantang as well as tapai. They are different from one another, but all are made from rice-based drinks. It is sold widely in Sabah including in some major hotels.

The wine is also usually used in the making of Tuaran mee and sup manuk lihing (lihing chicken soup), and has recently been used to make ice cream as well as cocktails, and served during the Kaamatan festival.

== Origin and background ==
The lihing has been an integral part of tradition among the indigenous Kadazan-Dusun, who are associated with both lowland and upland paddy farming with rice as their main staple. It is regarded as a variant of tapai, although it diverges due to its fermentation process, which is longer, as lihing appearance exhibits greater translucency.

== Preparation ==
The key ingredient in the making of lihing wine is the pulut (glutinuous or sticky rice), which is mixed with a local yeast known as sasad. The pulut is first being cooked and needs to be monitored properly to prevent it from being too soft or overcooked. Once cooling, yeast is added, where it is then placed in a tajau (jar) or other earthenware. It is fermented for around three months or longer, where the colour and taste will change significantly as well as the alcohol content, producing a strong result. There are some taboos that have been passed for generations when making the wine, such as not swearing, fighting, talking badly and loudly while preparing it as well as not being allowed to touch any sour ingredients such as lemon fruit to ensure that the taste and quality of the wine are not affected.

== Cultural significance ==
The practices of brewing the drink, including tapai, are integral parts of Sabah's local indigenous culture, symbolising their resilience and unity among the communities. In both Sabah and Sarawak of East Malaysia, it is legal for indigenous persons to sell their native alcoholic drinks without a licence, as both lihing and tuak are classified as undistilled liquor, though they may need proper licences when extending the sale to each other's states as well as to West Malaysia.

== Gallery ==
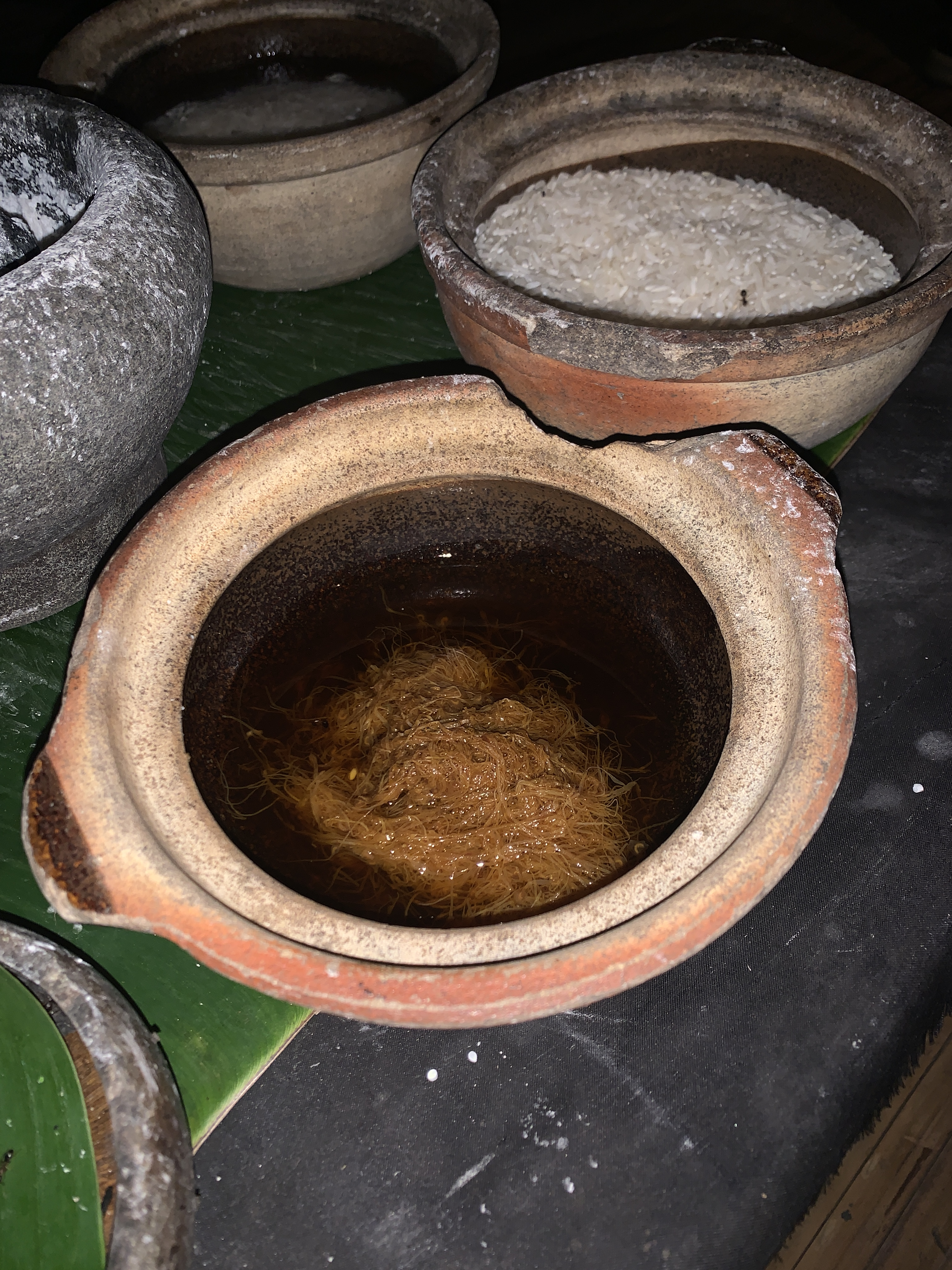
A close-up of the ingredients in the making of lihing.

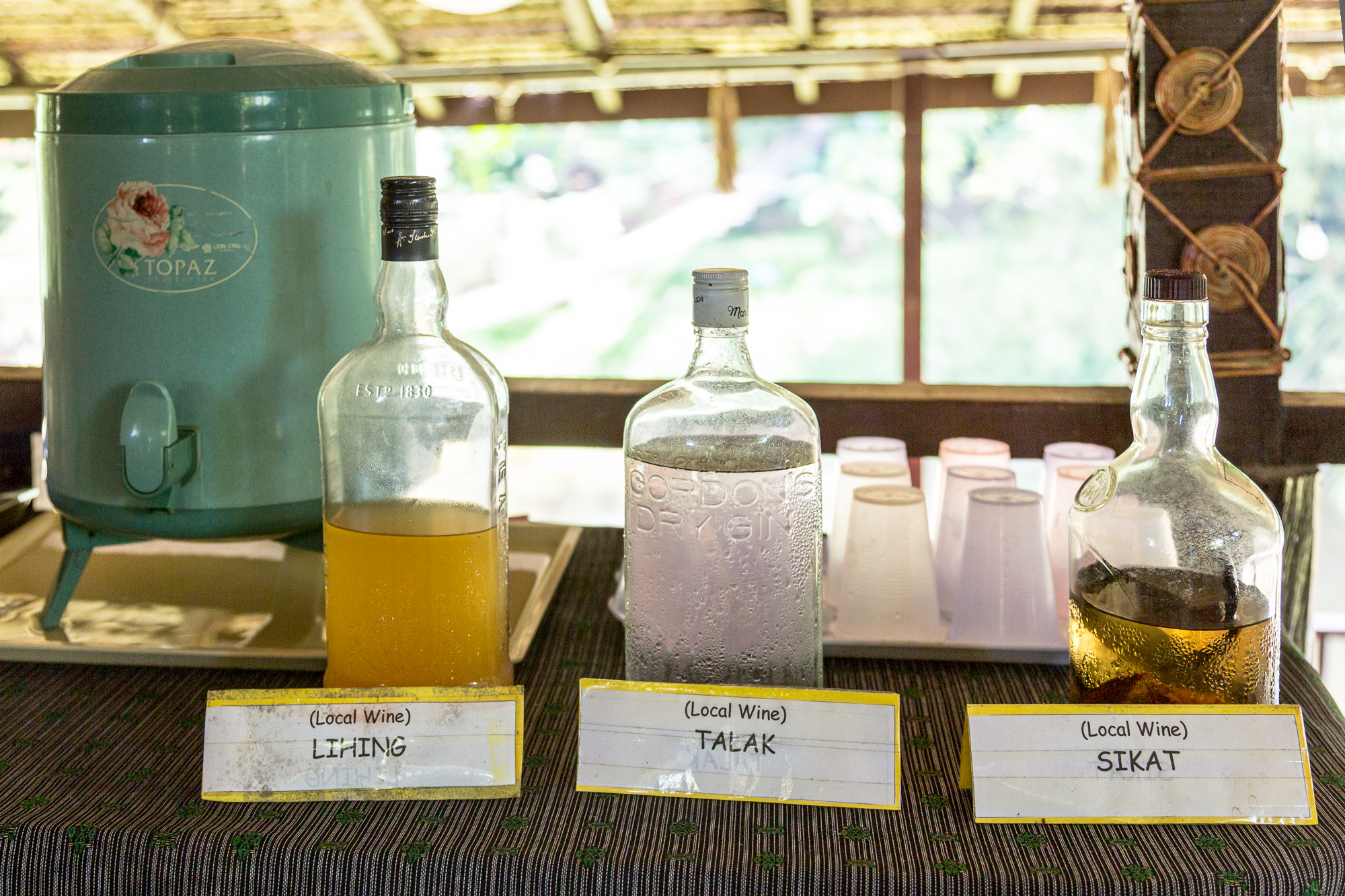
Lihing (left) together with talak and sikat.

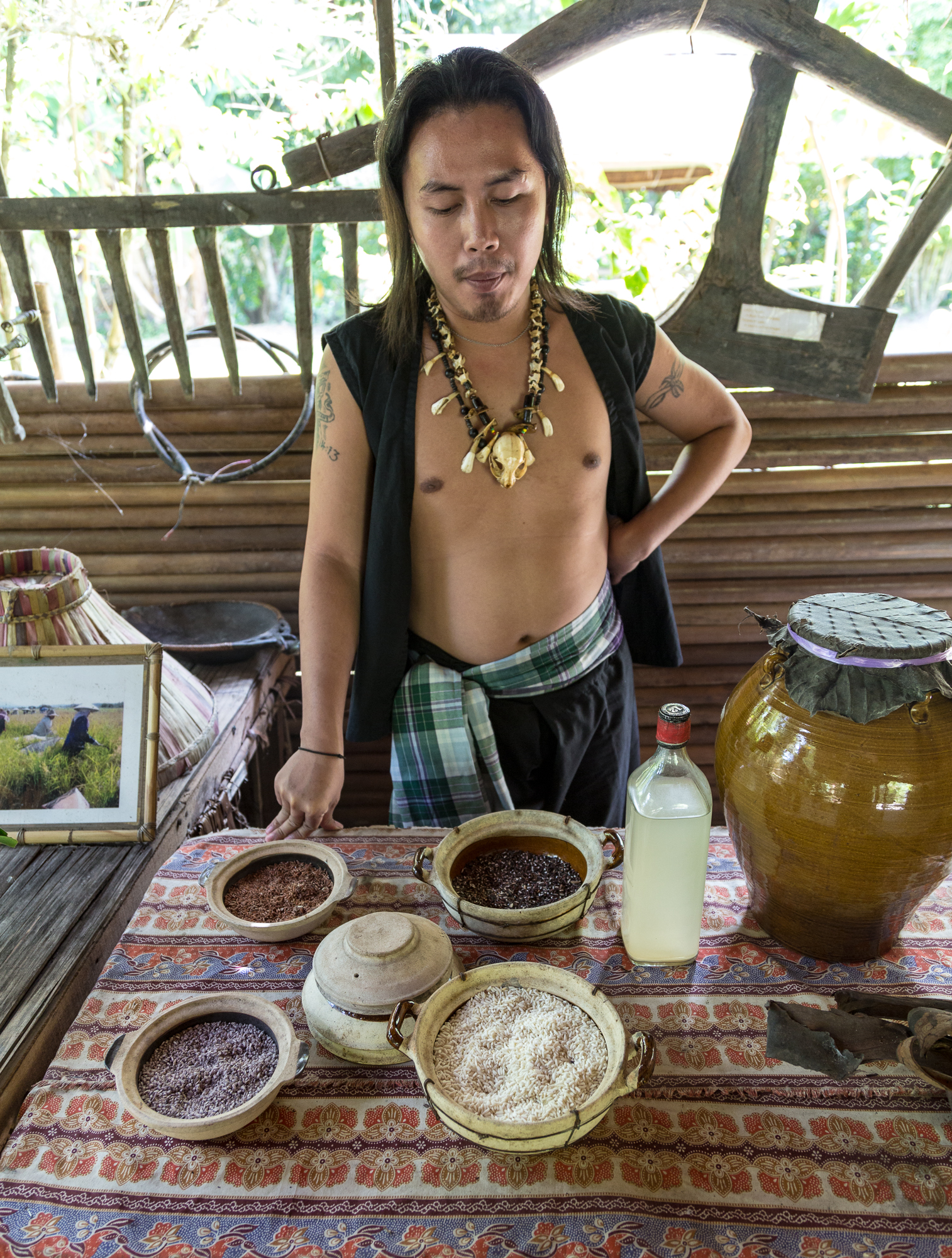
Three different types of rice being used to produce lihing, talak and sikat.

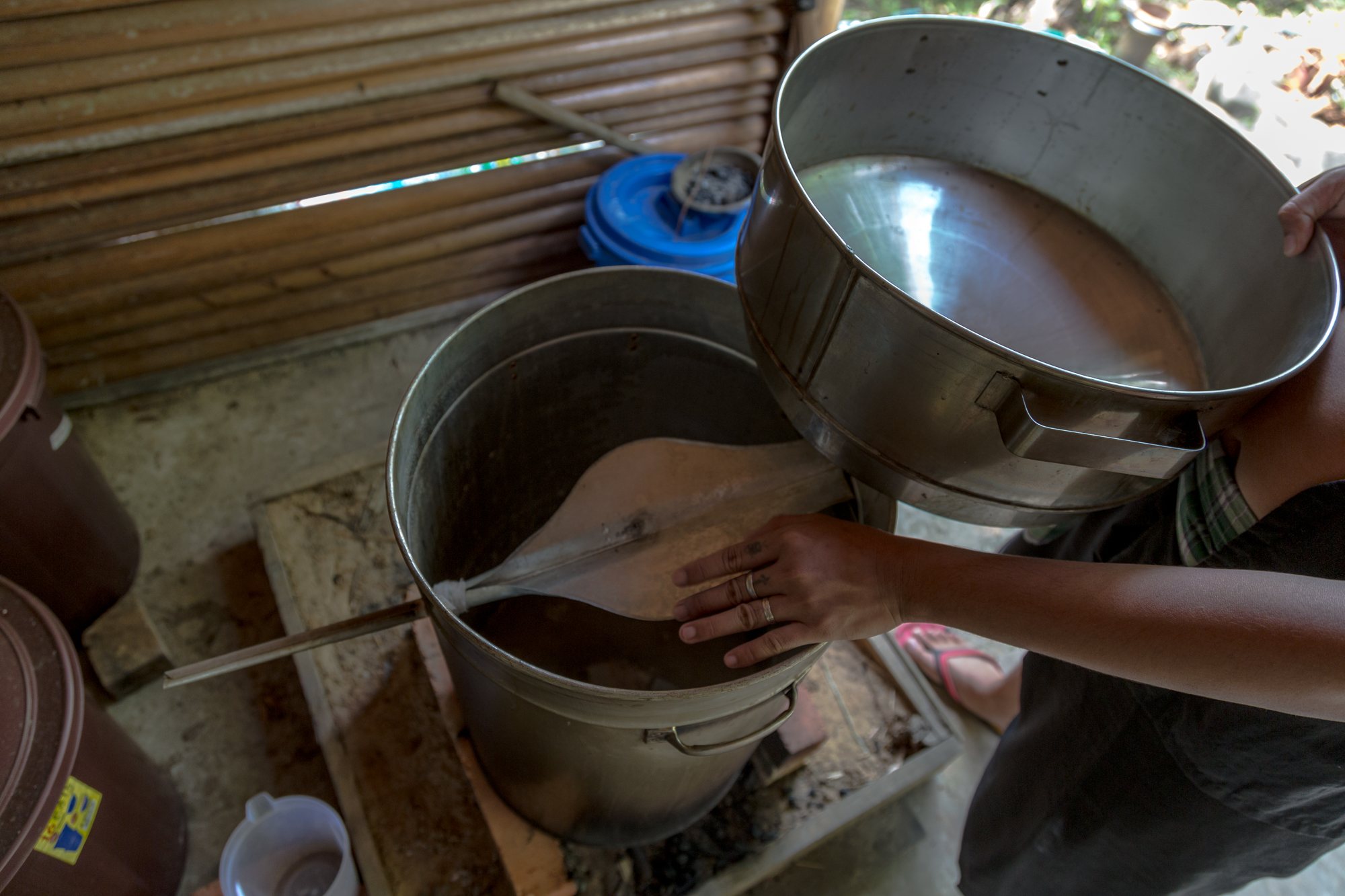
Distillation equipment to produce the three different types of rice wine.

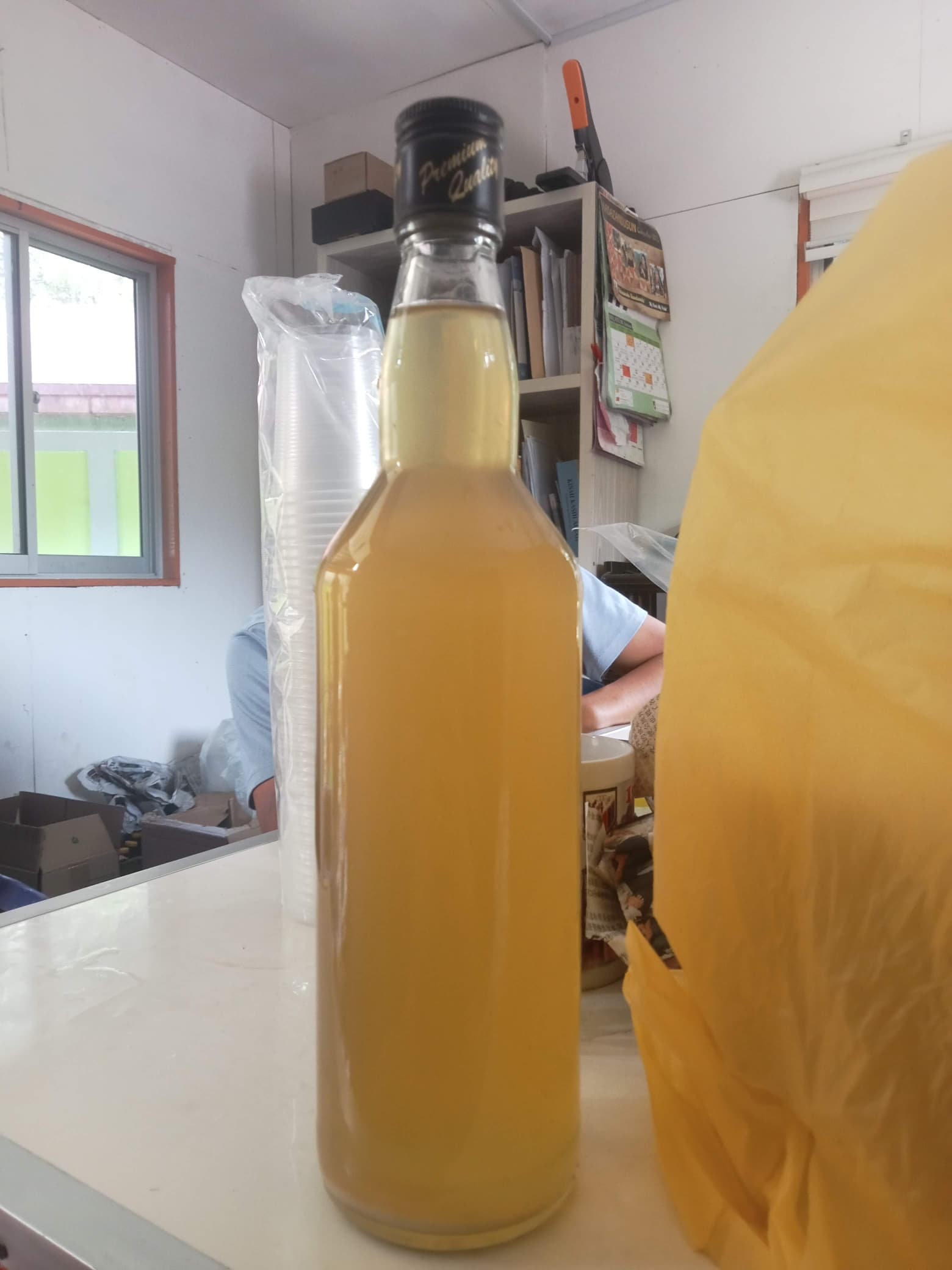
A bottle of lihing.

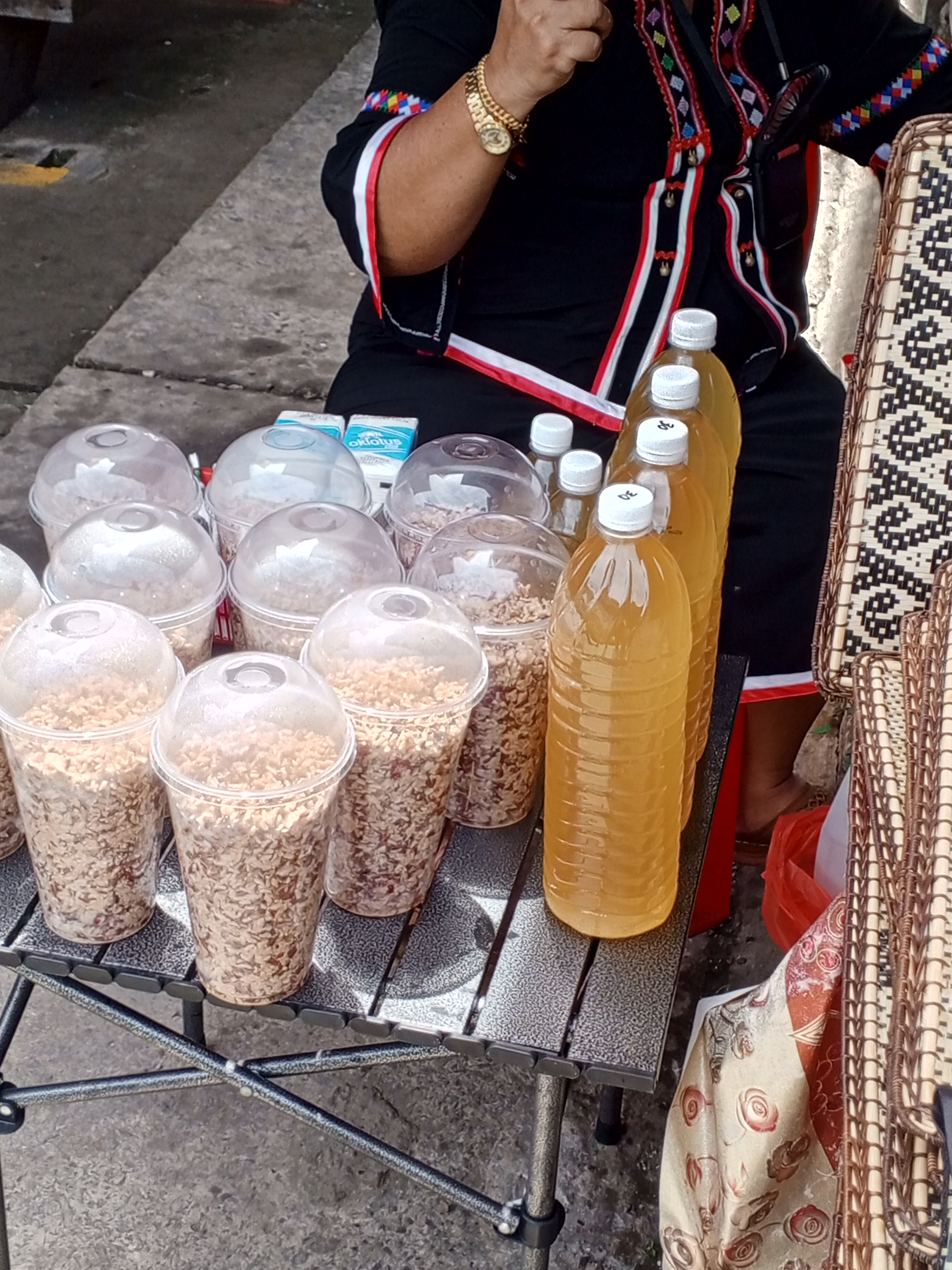
Lihing in plastic bottles.

== See also ==
- Alcohol in Malaysia
- List of alcoholic drinks
- Bahar (drink) – Traditional palm wine of the Dusun from Sabah, Malaysia
- Langkau – Traditional rice wine of the Dayak and Iban from Sarawak, Malaysia
- Montoku (drink) – Traditional rice wine of the Kadazan-Dusun and Rungus from Sabah, Malaysia
- Tapai (drink) – Traditional fermented preparation of starchy foods in Asia
- Tuak – Traditional palm or rice wine of Indonesia and Malaysia
