= Montoku (drink) =

Traditional rice wine of the Kadazan-Dusun and Rungus from Sabah, Malaysia

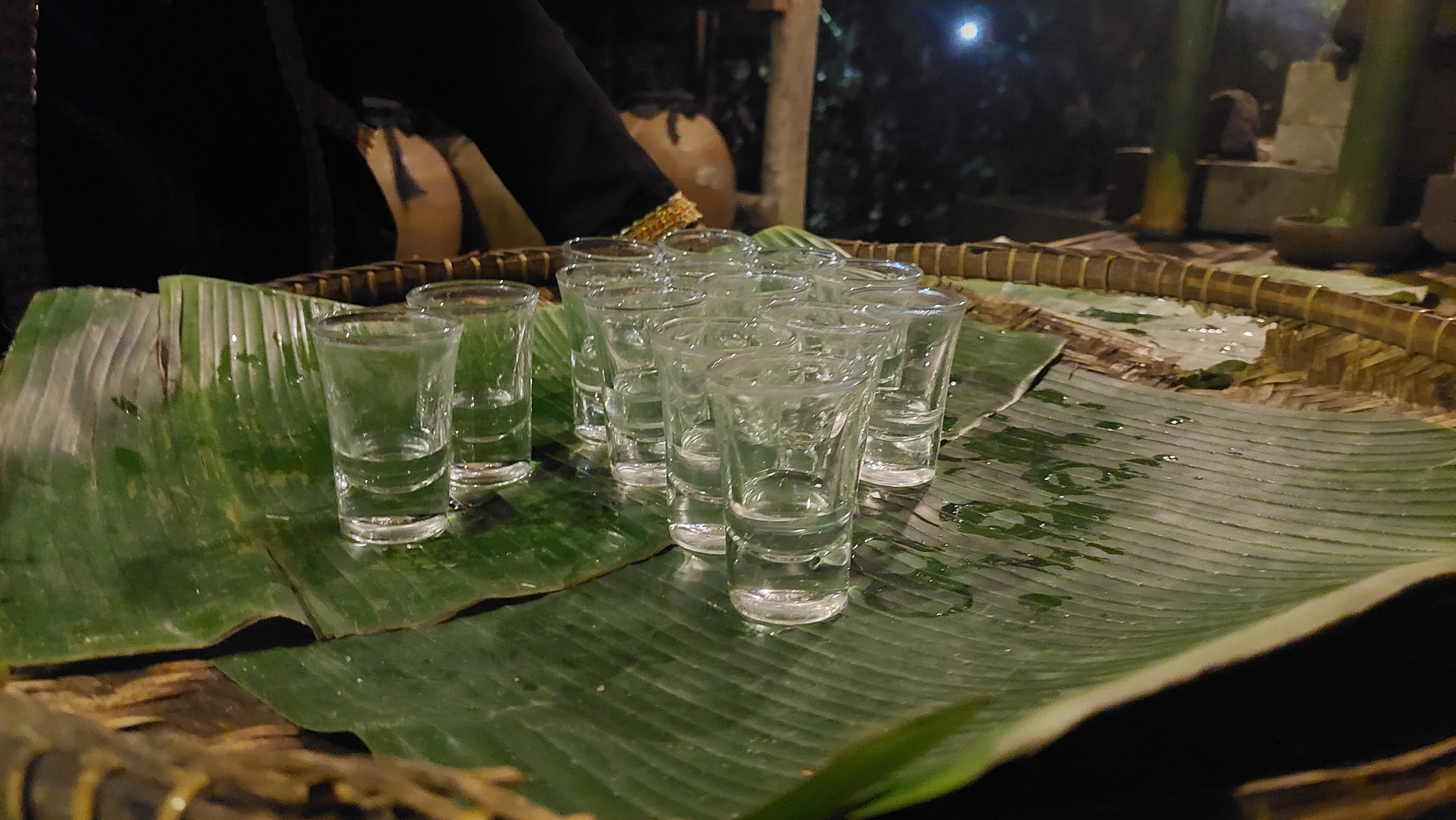
- Montoku being served in glasses, a Dusunic rice wine speciality
- Type: Rice wine
- Other name(s): talak, Sabah moonshine
- Origin: Sabah, Malaysia, (Interior Division, West Coast Division)
- Alcohol by volume: 20% to 40%
- Colour: Clear, transparent
- Flavour: Very strong, sharp, and potent alcohol taste with a fiery kick
- Ingredients: Either regular rice, glutinous rice, or sometimes cassava/tapioca mixed with sasad or ragi (yeast)
- Related products: bahar, lihing and tapai (Sabah), langkau and tuak (Sarawak, Kalimantan, Java, and Sumatra), saguer (Maluku Islands and New Guinea)

Montoku (also known as talak) is a type of Malaysian rice wine that originates from the state of Sabah. It is a distilled version of another Sabah's rice wine of lihing, made from either regular rice, glutinous rice with sometimes cassava/tapioca mixed with sasad or ragi (yeast), and is a traditional rice wine for the Kadazan-Dusun and Rungus people. It is also referred as talak in certain Dusun dialects and commonly served during various occasions such as Christmas and the Kaamatan.

== Origin and background ==
Similar to lihing, the montoku has been an integral part of tradition among the indigenous Kadazan-Dusun, who are associated with both lowland and upland paddy farming with rice as their main staple. The indigenous rice wine production is rooted in the traditional local belief in Bambarayon (Bambaazon), the spirit who protects their paddy fields and ensures a continuous good harvest. It is made through the distillation process from the leftover rice lees of either lihing or tapai rather than directly from rice wine itself with an appearance similar to Sarawak's langkau. Brewers need to follow certain taboos throughout the making process to ensure the taste is not affected. This drink is also popular among the Rungus community in Sabah, with its appearance usually clear and colourless.

== Preparation ==
It is made throughout the process of cooking rice husks from either the lihing or tapai where the collected steam is channelled into a container. Since the process is through distillation, the alcohol content in montoku is higher. Each indigenous maker has their recipe passed down through families as an heirloom. Most versions use the leftover rice of filtered lihing, while other makers use tapai that has turned sour during fermentation. Some modern creations even come up with varieties of different flavours which are blended with exotic forest fruits such as the bambangan (Bornean wild mango).

== Gallery ==
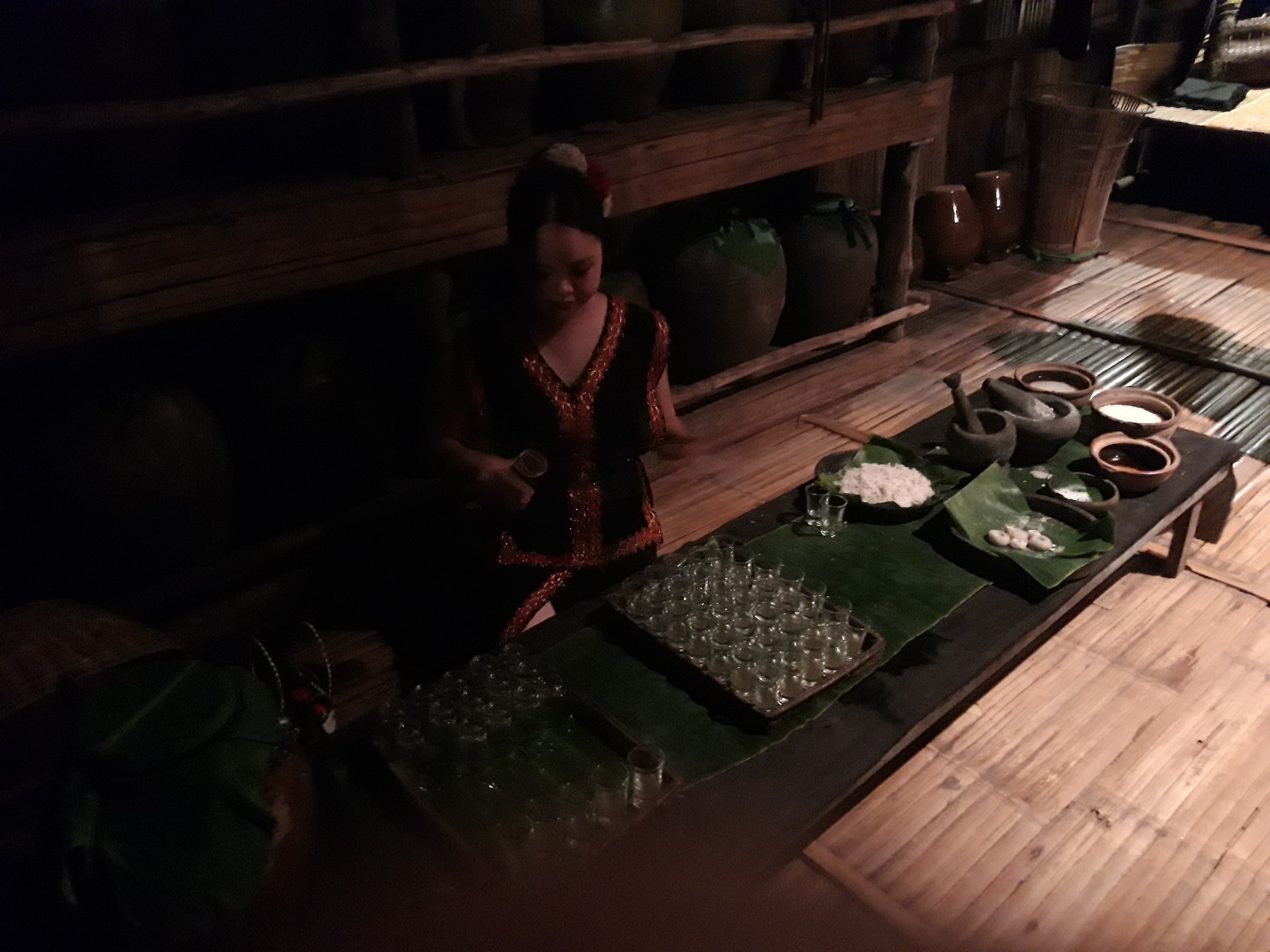
An indigenous Kadazan-Dusun woman is preparing the montoku at the Mari Mari Cultural Village.

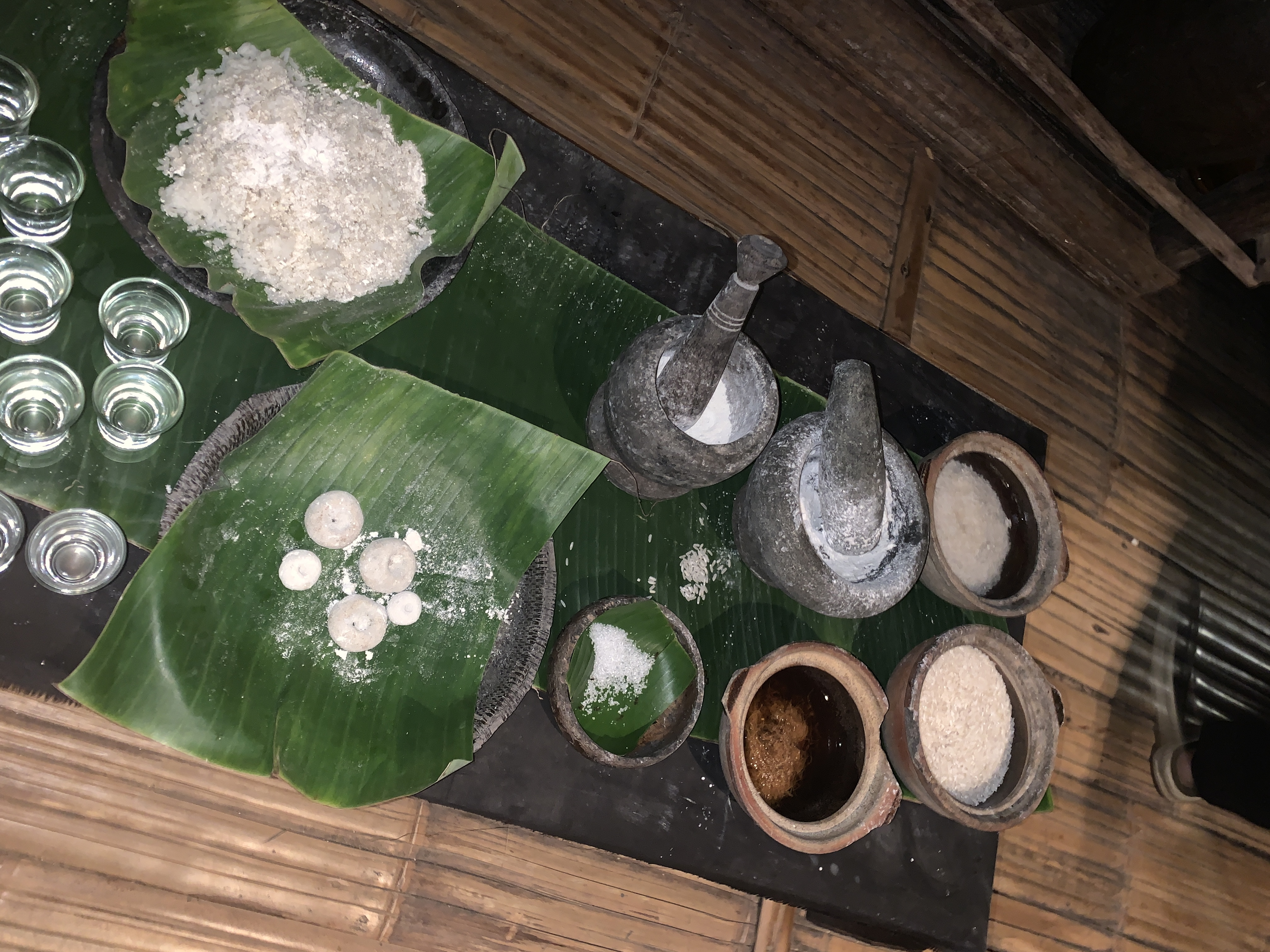
Montoku ingredients.

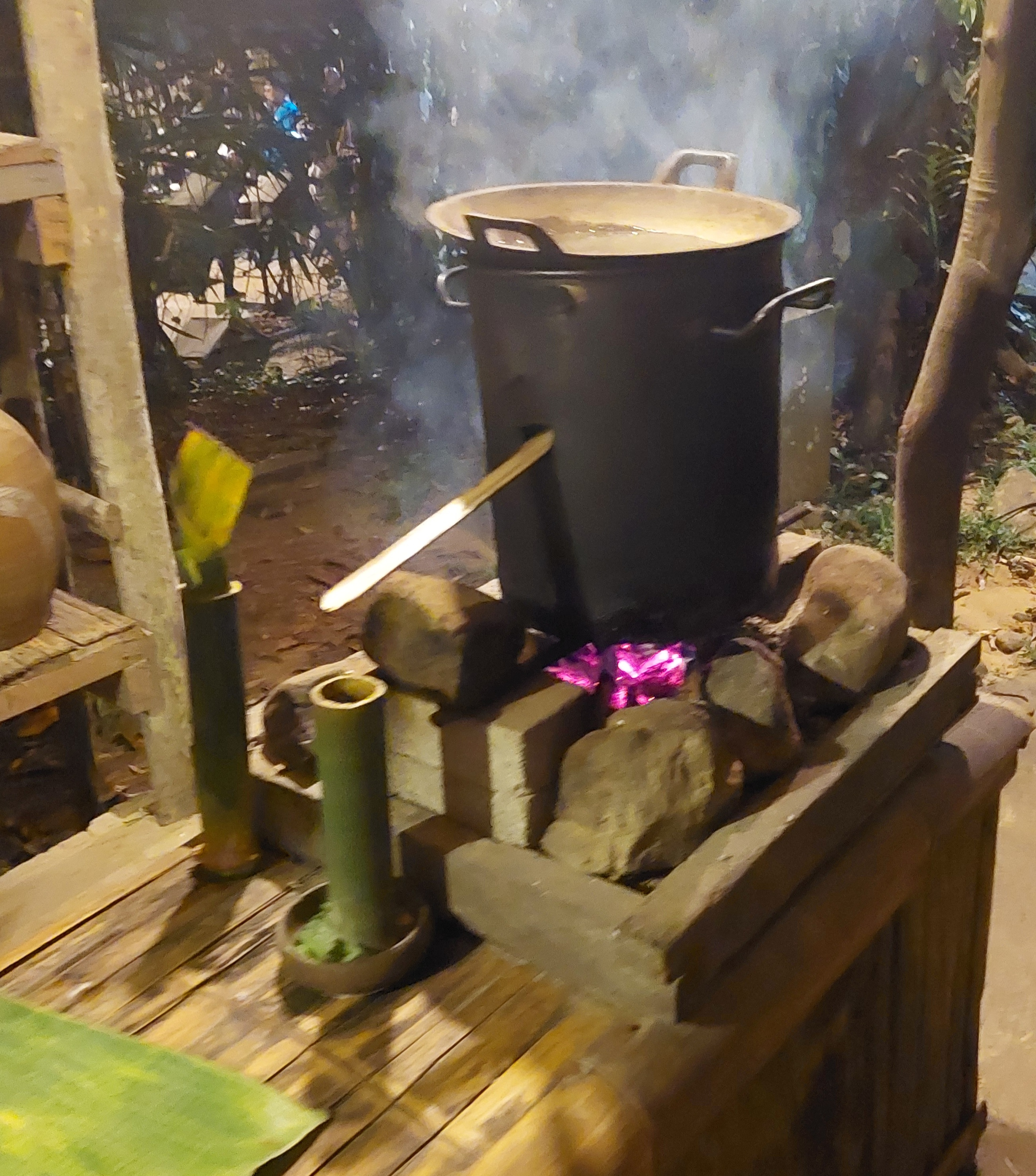
The equipment for the distillation process of montoku.

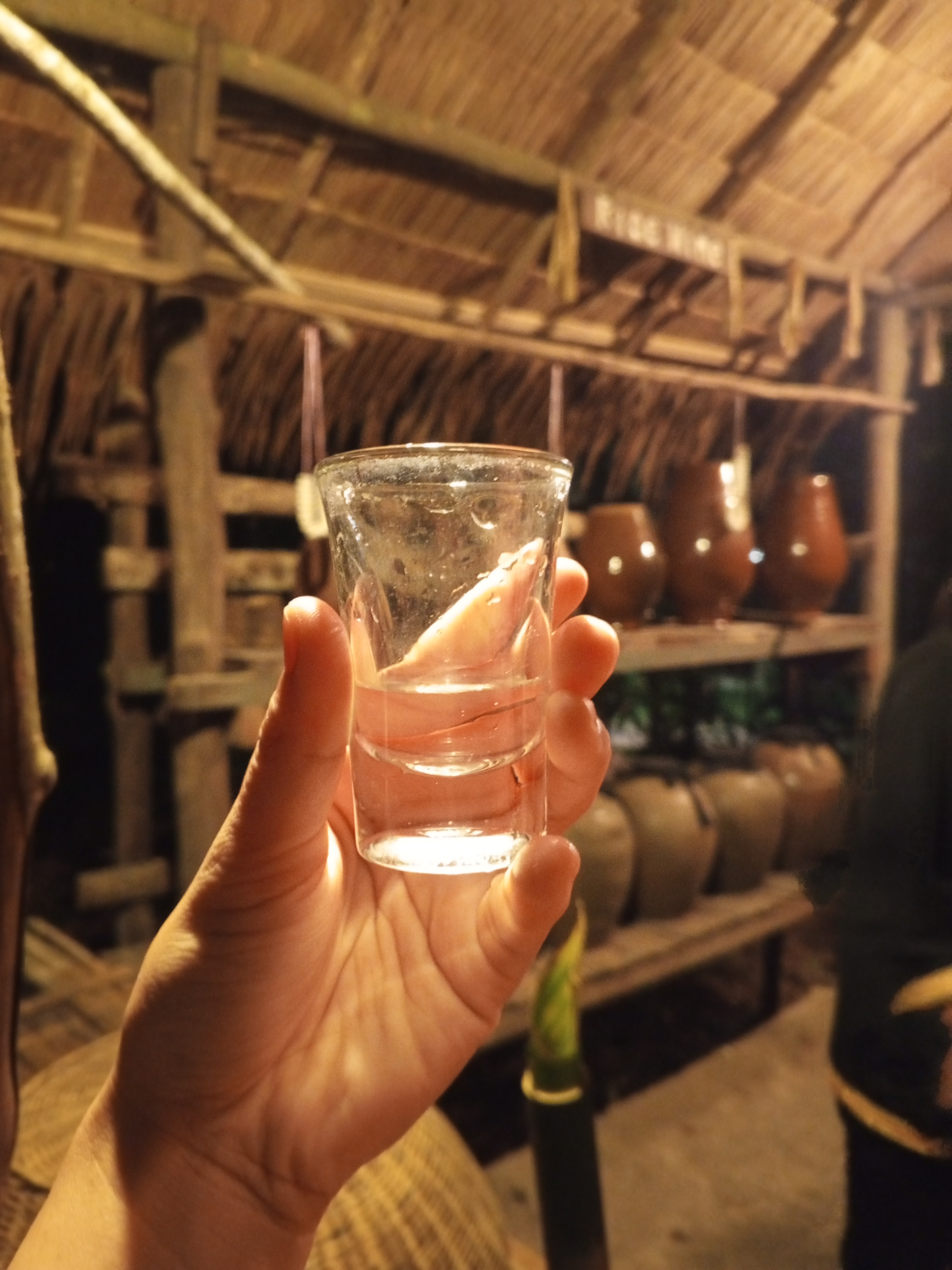
Montoku in a glass.

== See also ==
- Alcohol in Malaysia
- List of alcoholic drinks
- Bahar (drink) – Traditional palm wine of the Dusun from Sabah, Malaysia
- Langkau – Traditional rice wine of the Dayak and Iban from Sarawak, Malaysia
- Lihing – Traditional rice wine of the Kadazan-Dusun from Sabah, Malaysia
- Tapai (drink) – Traditional fermented preparation of starchy foods in Asia
- Tuak – Traditional palm or rice wine of Indonesia and Malaysia
