= Bahar (drink) =

Traditional palm wine of the Dusun from Sabah, Malaysia

- Type: Palm wine
- Origin: Sabah, Malaysia, (West Coast Division, Kudat Division)
- Alcohol by volume: 10% to 25%
- Colour: Red
- Flavour: Strong, sweet, and slightly sour
- Ingredients: Fresh coconut flower sap mixed with rosok tree bark
- Related products: lihing, montoku and tapai (Sabah), langkau and tuak (Sarawak, Kalimantan, Java, and Sumatra), saguer (Maluku Islands and New Guinea)

Bahar is a type of Malaysian palm wine that originates from the state of Sabah. It is made through a fermentation process of fresh coconut flower sap that was mixed with rosok tree bark, and is a traditional palm wine for the Kadazan-Dusun especially among the Lotud Dusun of Tuaran District (including Kiulu Dusun in Kiulu) and other Dusuns in Kota Belud and Kota Marudu districts. The drink taste sweet and slightly sour where it is commonly served during various occasions such as Christmas and the Kaamatan.

== Types of bahar ==
The two types of bahar that are common in Sabah are the Kiulu Bahar and Topokon Bahar, most of which are produced by the Lotud Dusun community in Tuaran. Topokon Bahar is slightly bitter in taste, while Kiulu Bahar has a sour taste.

== Preparation ==
The drink is prepared by placing a recently collected sap in a container and mixing it with rosok bark, where it is stirred slowly before being covered with a cloth or banana leaf. It was then fermented for around 12–24 hours, where the mixture turned red and prepared to be stirred when ready.

== See also ==
- Alcohol in Malaysia
- List of alcoholic drinks
- Langkau – Traditional rice wine of the Dayak and Iban from Sarawak, Malaysia
- Lihing – Traditional rice wine of the Kadazan-Dusun from Sabah, Malaysia
- Montoku (drink) – Traditional rice wine of the Kadazan-Dusun and Rungus from Sabah, Malaysia
- Tapai (drink) – Traditional fermented preparation of starchy foods in Asia
- Tuak – Traditional palm or rice wine of Indonesia and Malaysia
