= 2018 Malaysia methanol poisonings =

- Location: Malaysia
- Date: September 2018
- Attack type: Poisoning
- Weapon: Methanol
- Deaths: 45
- Injuries: Unknown

The 2018 Malaysia methanol poisonings occurred in September 2018 in three states and two federal territories in Malaysia comprising Selangor (64 cases), Kuala Lumpur and Putrajaya (18 cases), Perak (13 cases) and Negeri Sembilan (3 cases). Until October, 45 people from the total of 98 cases have been reported dead by the Malaysian Health Ministry. Most of the victims were foreign workers from Bangladesh, Indonesia, Myanmar, and Nepal, as well as several Malaysians.

An investigation found that most of the victims had bought a cheap liquor from hole in the wall stores in bid to evade the tax rates on Malaysian alcohols that range from 150–560%. The Malaysian government responded to the incident by confiscating 15,630 bottles of liquor from 1,961 premises across the country. Around 30 people in connection with the distribution have been arrested despite little response and insufficient enforcement of the black market in the country from the authorities has attracted criticism.

== See also ==
- List of methanol poisoning incidents
