= Langkau =

Traditional rice wine of the Dayak and Iban from Sarawak, Malaysia

- Type: Rice wine
- Other name: Sarawak moonshine
- Distributor: Carus Group of Companies
- Origin: Sarawak, Malaysia, (Kuching Division, Samarahan Division)
- Alcohol by volume: 30% to 50%
- Colour: Clear, transparent
- Flavour: Very strong, sharp, and potent alcohol taste with a fiery kick
- Ingredients: Glutinous rice mixed with ragi (yeast)
- Related products: bahar, lihing, montoku, and tapai (Sabah), tuak (Sarawak, Kalimantan, Java, and Sumatra), saguer (Maluku Islands and New Guinea)

Langkau is a type of Malaysian rice wine that originates from the state of Sarawak. It is a distilled version of another Sarawak's rice wine of tuak, made from glutinous rice with ragi (yeast), and is a traditional rice wine for the Dayak and Iban people. It is commonly served during various occasions such as Christmas and the Gawai Dayak.

== Origin and background ==
Its name, langkau, comes from the local Iban term for "a hut or shelter", referencing the place where it is often distilled. The drink is usually made at home with traditional equipment where the recipe has been passed down through generations and is also considered the indigenous traditional remedy to treat muscle aches or insomnia. Other theories considered it a technique brought over by one of Borneo's many immigrant communities.

== Preparation ==
The langkau is distilled from tuak and is considered a strong alcoholic drink, with its alcohol content reaching up to 50%, similar to Sabah's montoku. The procedure commenced with the heating of the fermented rice mash, followed by the collection and cooling of the evaporated alcohol back into its liquid form.

== See also ==
- Alcohol in Malaysia
- List of alcoholic drinks
- Bahar (drink) – Traditional palm wine of the Dusun from Sabah, Malaysia
- Lihing – Traditional rice wine of the Kadazan-Dusun from Sabah, Malaysia
- Montoku (drink) – Traditional rice wine of the Kadazan-Dusun and Rungus from Sabah, Malaysia
- Tapai – Traditional fermented preparation of starchy foods in Asia
- Tuak – Traditional palm or rice wine of Indonesia and Malaysia
