= List of Malaysian drinks =

This is a list of Malaysian drinks. The most common and popular Malaysian drinks and beverages are teh (teh tarik) and kopi Tarik (coffee).

== Hot drink ==
- Teh tarik - Indian inspired drinks
- Teh Halia - Indian inspired drinks
- Ipoh white coffee- Famous in Ipoh
- Tenom coffee -A popular Robusta coffee variety in Sabah.
- Indian filter coffee - Popular among Malaysian Indian, also known as Madras cofee
- Bru Cofee- Popular among Malaysian Indian
- Masala Tea - Popular among Malaysian Indian

== Cold beverages ==
Name	Image	Region /Race	Description
Bandung		Malay and Indian Muslim	A beverage consists of milk flavoured with rose cordial syrup, giving a pink colour.
Cendol		Malay, Indian and Peranakan Cina (Originated from Indonesia)	Rice flour jelly with green natural coloring from pandan leaf, mixed with coconut milk, shaved ice and palm/brown suga
Dadih		Nationwide (Popular in Negeri Sembilan and Terengganu)	Made from buffalo milk. Originated from Indonesia
Janda pulang		Malay (Famous in Negeri Sembilan)	A beverage consists of water, Coconut contents and palm sugar.
Coconut water		Malay and Indian (Also famous nationwide)	

== Soft drink ==
- 100plus – brand of isotonic energy drink by Fraser and Neave
- Fruit Tree by Fraser and Neave
- Ice Mountain by Fraser and Neave
- Seasons by Fraser and Neave
