= Jaz (beer) =

Pilsner-type rice beer from Malaysia

- Type: Pilsner-type rice beer
- Origin: Malaysia
- Ingredients: Rice, malt, hops, yeast
- Website: www.jazbeer.com

Jaz Beer is a pilsner-type rice beer, the first and only brand brewed in Malaysia. It is produced using rice (rather than the usual barley), imported malt, imported hops, and German cultivated yeast. Due to Malaysian licensing laws, the product sale is limited to non-Muslims at Refreshment Outlets, such as coffee shops, restaurants and food courts; or night entertainment outlets, as pubs, karaoke, clubs, Beer gardens and late-opening restaurants.

Unlike many developed countries, in Malaysia the majority of alcohol consumption occurs on premises. The 60% of the population that is Malay and Muslim is reputed not to drink, as opposed to the Indian and Chinese minorities. The latter has been continuously targeted by Jaz advertising, with much of their marketing material published in Chinese and the selection of Ethnic Chinese celebrities, as Gillian Chung.
