= Tapai =

Traditional fermented preparation of starchy foods in Asia

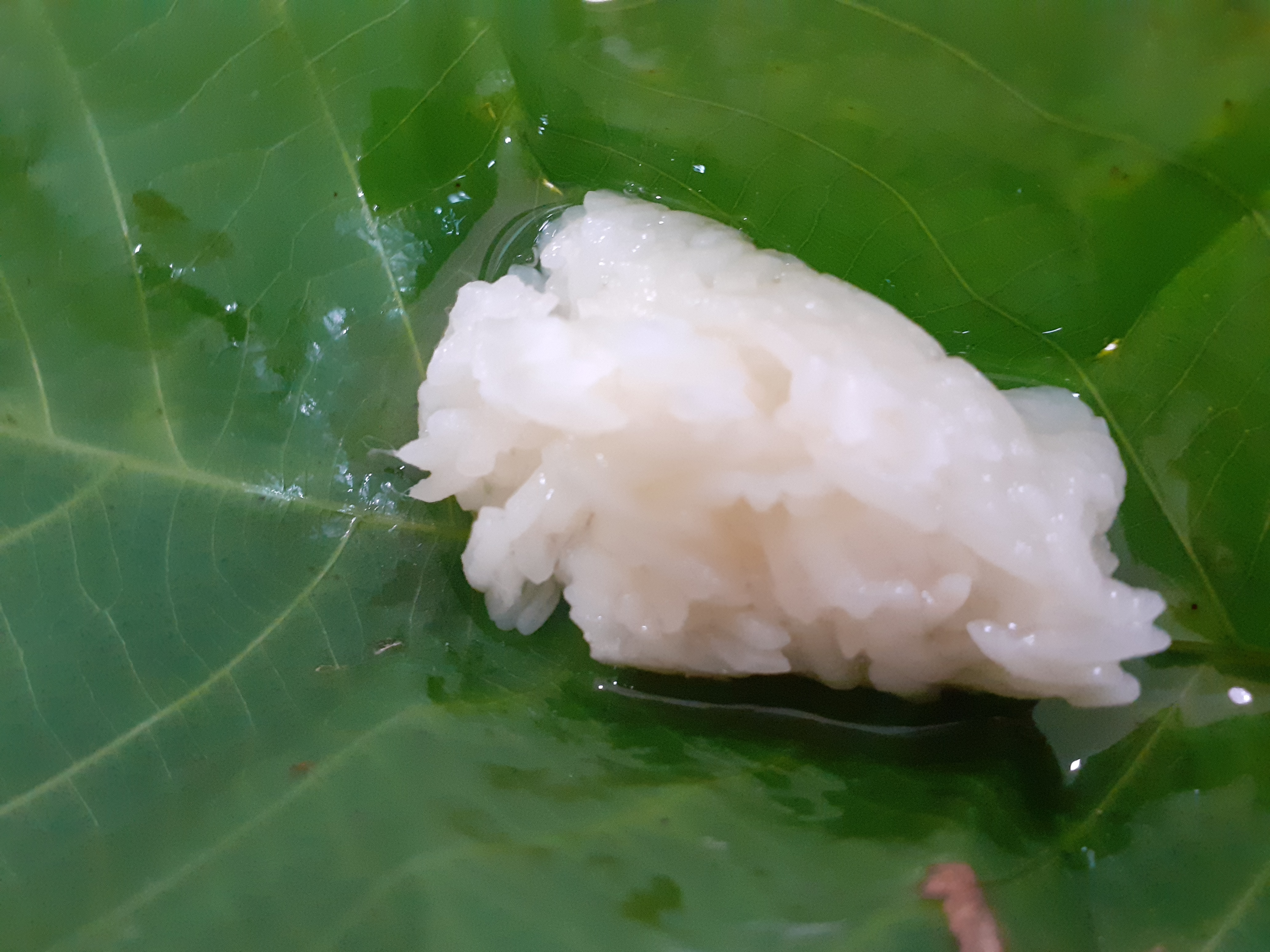
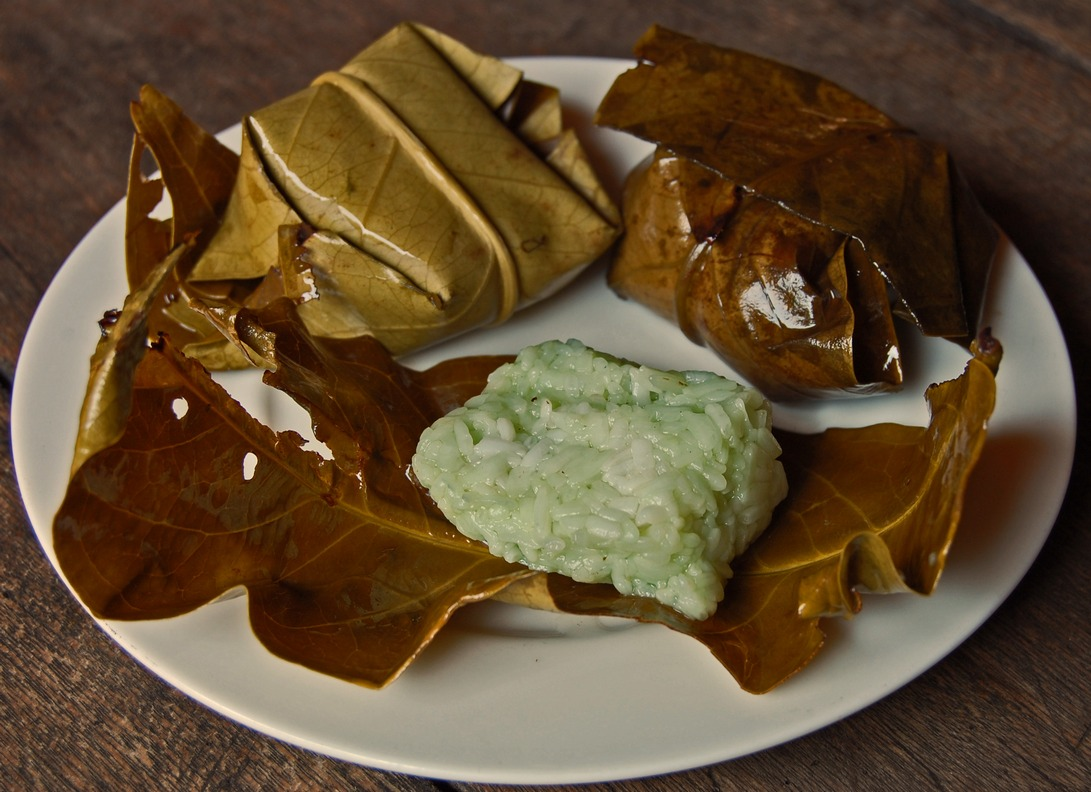
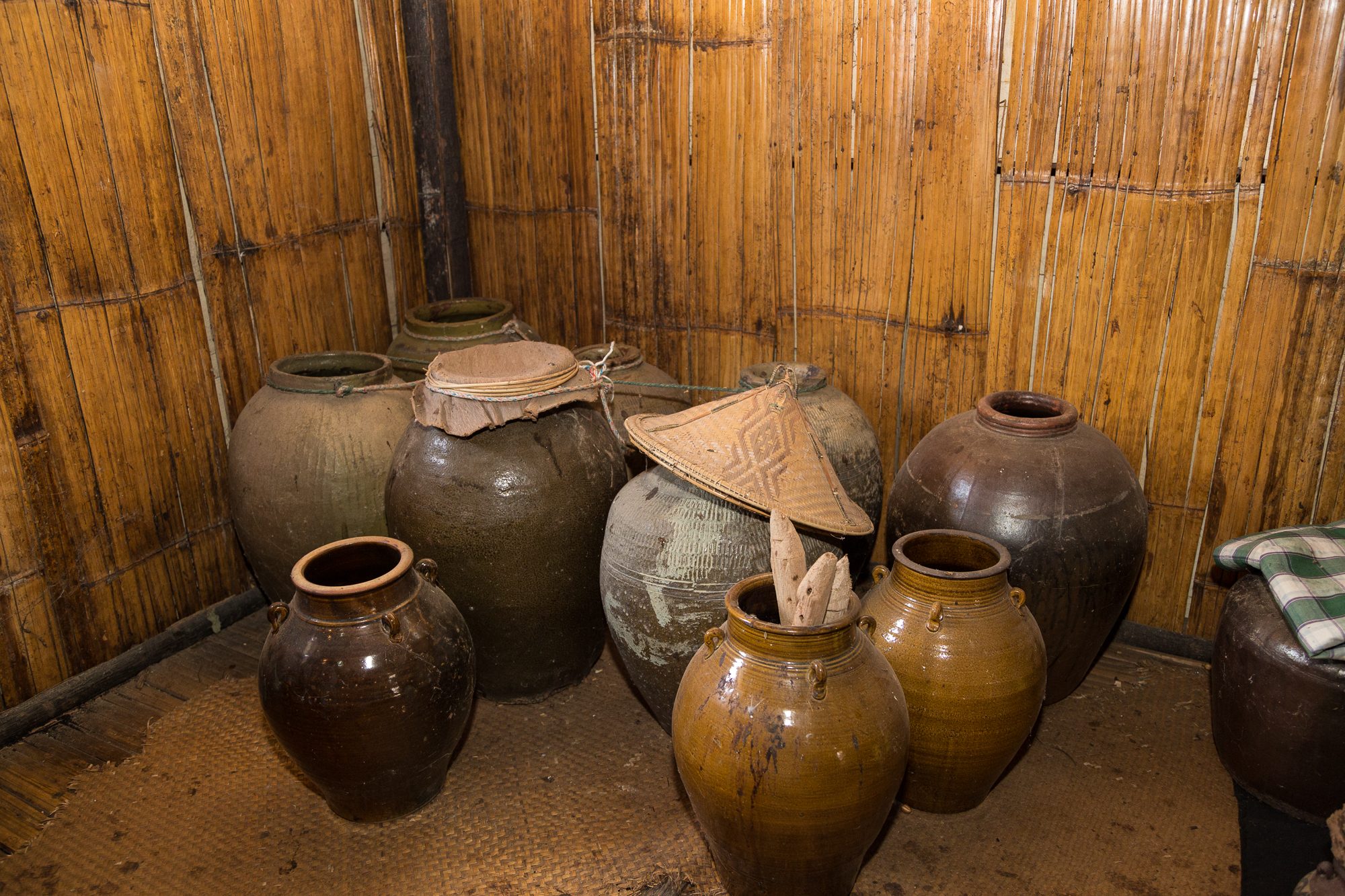
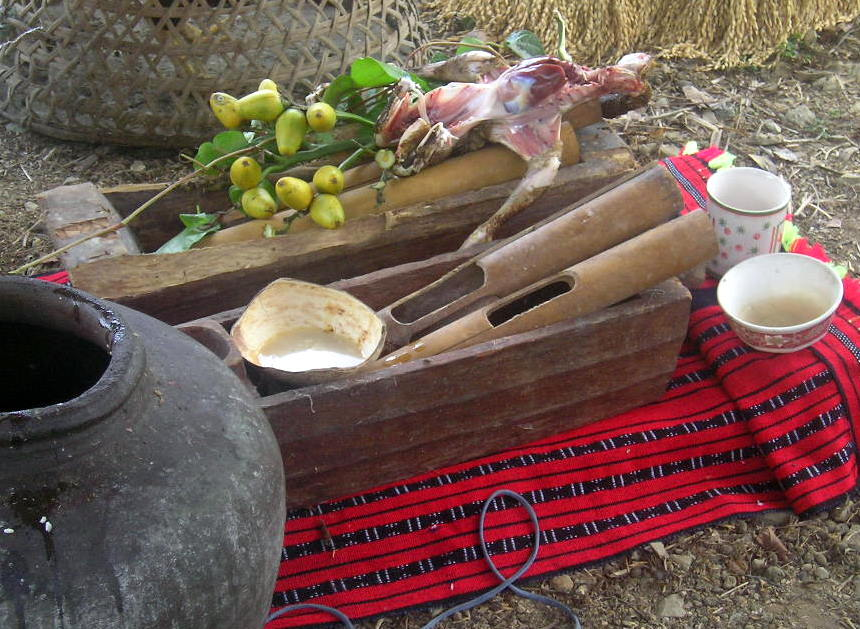
- Different types of tapai in Southeast Asia. By clockwise: Tapai ketan, fermented glutinous rice wrapped in leaf, Kuningan, West Java, Indonesia, a jar and bowls of baya (tapuy) in a harvest ritual by an Ifugao mumbaki (shaman) in the Cordillera Administrative Region, Philippines, jars for the making of the traditional rice wine of tapai among the Kadazan-Dusun in Sabah, Malaysia, and tapai pulut which is traditionally consumed in Brunei, Malaysia, and Singapore
- Alternative names: peuyeum, etc.
- Type: Rice wine, alcoholic paste
- Region or state: Southeast Asia, East Asia, South Asia
- Main ingredients: Usually white rice, glutinous rice

Tapai (also tapay or tape) is a traditional fermented preparation of rice or other starchy foods, and is found throughout much of Southeast Asia, especially in Austronesian cultures, and parts of East Asia. It refers to both the alcoholic paste and the alcoholic beverage derived from it. It has a sweet or sour taste and can be eaten as is, as ingredients for traditional recipes, or fermented further to make rice wine (which in some cultures is also called tapai). Tapai is traditionally made with white rice or glutinous rice, but can also be made from a variety of carbohydrate sources, including cassava and potatoes. Fermentation is performed by a variety of moulds including Aspergillus oryzae, Rhizopus oryzae, Amylomyces rouxii or Mucor species, and yeasts including Saccharomyces cerevisiae, and Saccharomycopsis fibuliger, Endomycopsis burtonii and others, along with bacteria.

== Etymology ==
Tapai is derived from Proto-Malayo-Polynesian *tapay ("fermented [food]"), which in turn is derived from Proto-Austronesian *tapaJ ("fermented [food]"). Derived cognates has come to refer to a wide variety of fermented food throughout Austronesia, including yeasted bread and rice wine. Proto-Malayo-Polynesian *tapay-an also refers to large earthen jars originally used for this fermentation process. Cognates in modern Austronesian languages include tapayan (Tagalog), tapayan (Maguindanaon), tepayan (Iban), and tempayan (Javanese and Malay).

== Starter culture ==
Tapai is made by inoculating a carbohydrate source with the required microorganisms in a starter culture. This culture has different names in different regions, shown in the table below. The culture can be naturally captured from the wild, by mixing rice flour with ground spices (include garlic, pepper, chilli, cinnamon), cane sugar or coconut water, slices of ginger or ginger extract, and water to make a dough. The dough is pressed into round cakes, about 3 cm across and 1 cm thick, and left to incubate on trays with banana leaves under and over them for two to three days. They are then dried and stored, ready for their next use.

Region	China	Indonesia/Malaysia	Korea	Philippines	Thailand
Name	peh-chu, jiuyao (simplified Chinese: 酒药; traditional Chinese: 酒藥; pinyin: jiǔyào; Jyutping: zau2joek1)	ragi tapai	nuruk	bubod, bubur, bubud, budbud, budbod, tapay	look-paeng

== Preparation ==
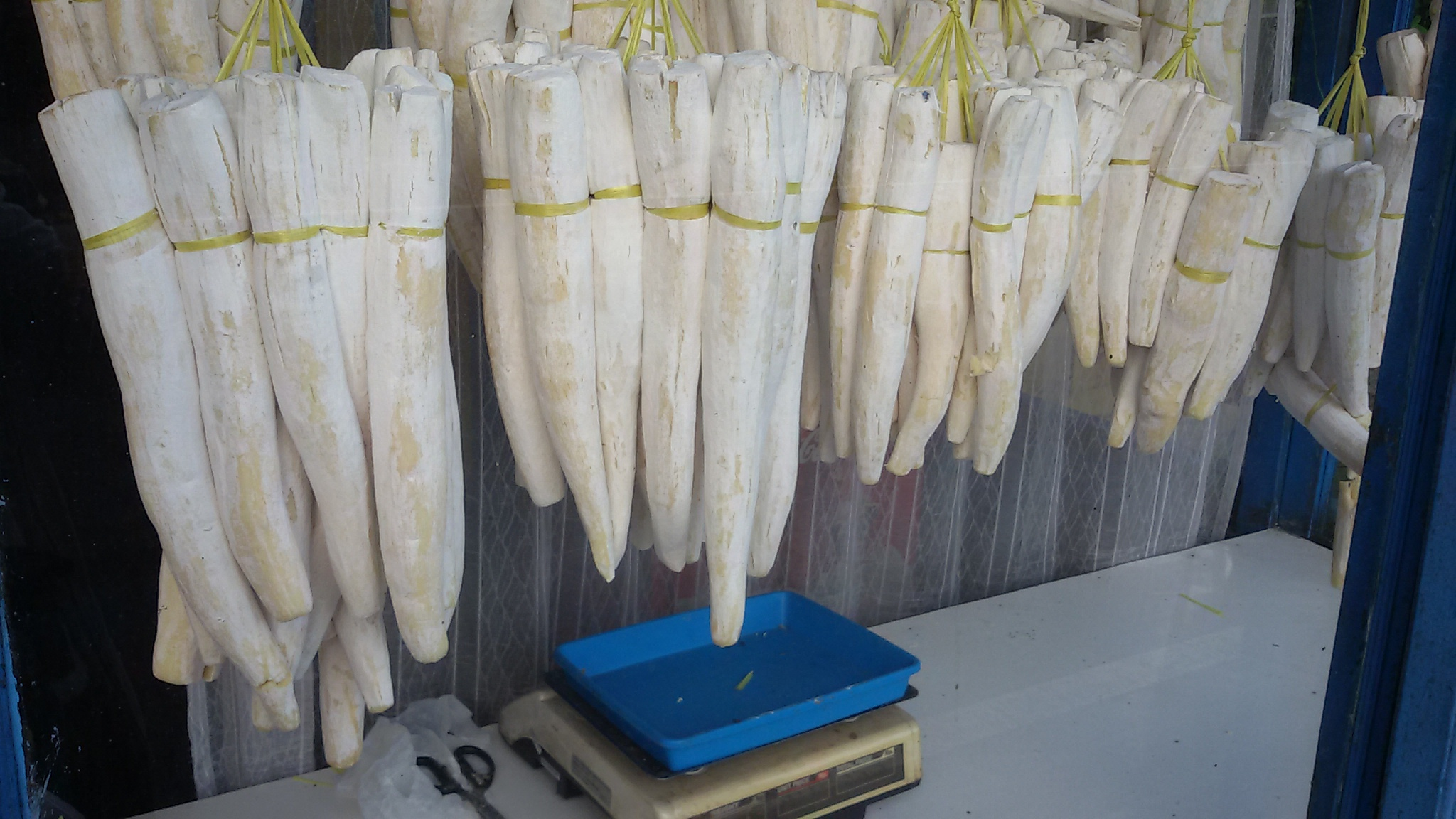
Dried alcoholic fermented cassava or peuyeum at Yogyakarta, Indonesia

=== Traditional ===
Traditionally, cooked white rice or glutinous rice are fermented in tapayan jars. Depending on the length of time and various processes, tapai will result in a large number of end products. These include slightly fermented dough used for rice cakes (Filipino galapong); dried fermented cakes (Indonesian brem cakes); fermented cooked rice (Filipino buro, tapay, inuruban, binubudan, binuboran; Indonesian/Malaysian tapai or tape); fermented rice with shrimp (Filipino buro, balaobalao, balobalo, tag-ilo); fermented rice with fish (Filipino buro); or various rice wines (Filipino tapuy, tapey, bubod, basi, pangasi; Indonesian brem wine).

=== Modern ===
==== Fermented rice gruel/paste ====
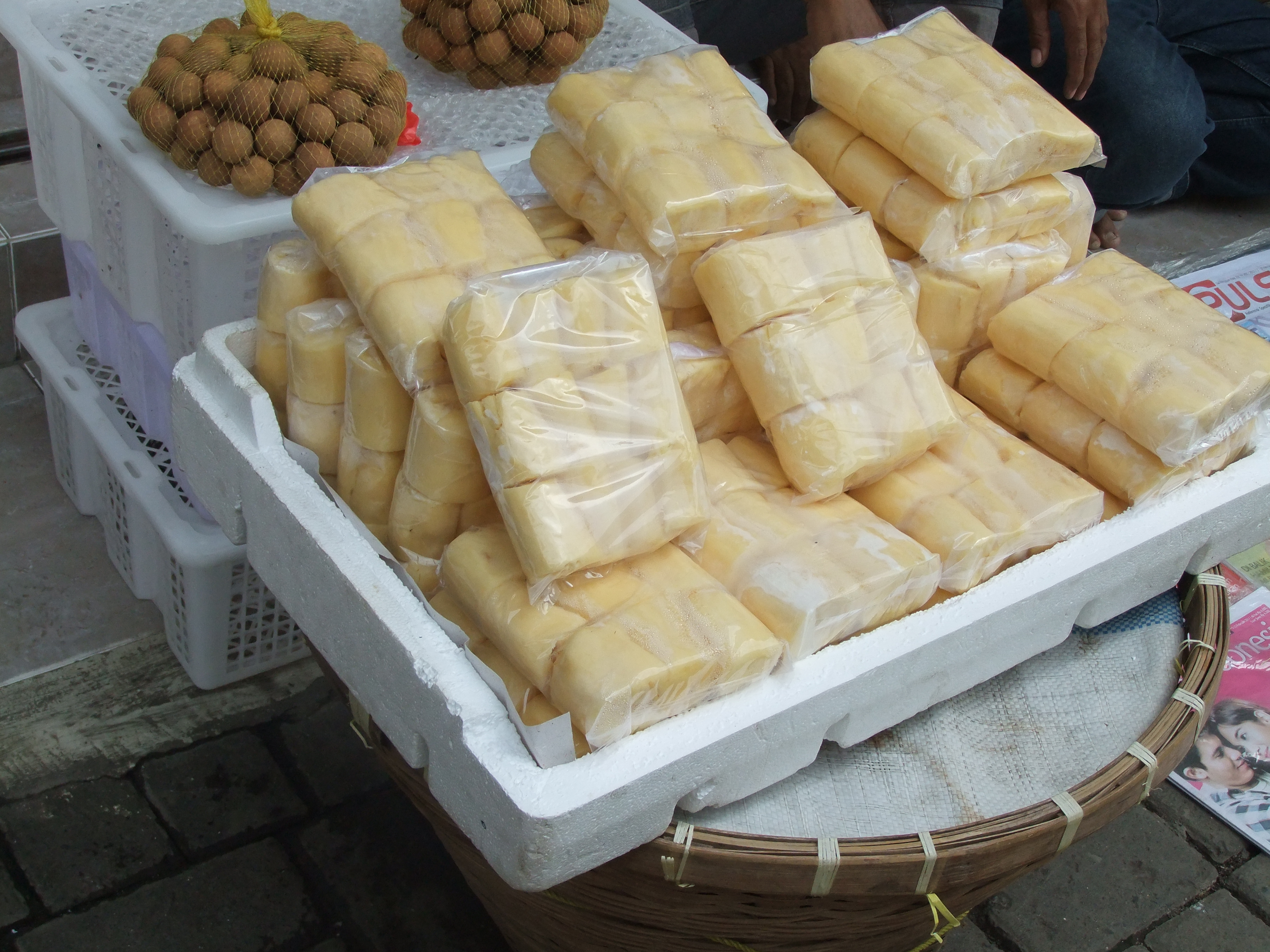
Packaged tapai paste made from cassava in Indonesia

In modern times, in addition to rice, different types of carbohydrates such as cassava or sweet potatoes can also be used. The general process is to wash and cook the target food, cool to about 30 °C (86 °F), mix in some powdered starter culture, and rest in covered jars for one to two days. With cassava and sweet potato, the tubers are washed and peeled before cooking, then layered in baskets with starter culture sprinkled over each layer. The finished gruel will taste sweet with a hint of alcohol, and can be consumed as is, or left for several days more to become more sour.

In Thailand, khao mak (Thai: ข้าวหมาก, pronounced [kʰâw màːk]), also known as "Thai fermented sweet rice dessert", is fermented for several days, resulting in an alcohol content of just over one per cent. It has a noticeable alcohol flavour with a sweet taste and is often packaged in banana leaves. Look pang is the traditional fermentation starter used to make khao mak. Look pang is a starch ball which contains mold (Aspergillus species, Rhizopus species, and Mucor species) and yeast (Saccharomyces cerevisiae and Candida species) inoculum in rice flour mixed with herbs such as pepper, garlic and galangal as an antibacterial agent. Its shape is a semicircular with 3–4 cm diameter. In the Khuan Don District, Satun Province it is called tapai.

Region	Brunei	Cambodia	China	India	Indonesia	Korea	Malaysia	Philippines	Singapore	Thailand
white rice	tapai	chao, tapai	lao-chao (Chinese: 醪糟; pinyin: láozāo; Jyutping: lou4 zou1), Jiuniang		tapai beras	nuruk	tapai nasi	tapay, buro, balaobalao, balobalo, galapong bigas	tapai nasi	khao-mak
glutinous rice	pulut	tapai		Bhattejaanr	tapai ketan		tapai pulut	tapay, binuburang basi, tapay basi, inuruban, binubudan, binuboran, galapong, galapong malagkit, galapong pilit, galapong salaket		
cassava					tapai ketela, tapai ubi kayu (Minangkabau), tape singkong, tape telo, peuyeum (Sundanese)		tapai ubi kayu	binuburang kamoteng kahoy, binuburang balanghoy, tapay panggi, tapay a banggala		

==== Rice wine ====
Tapai
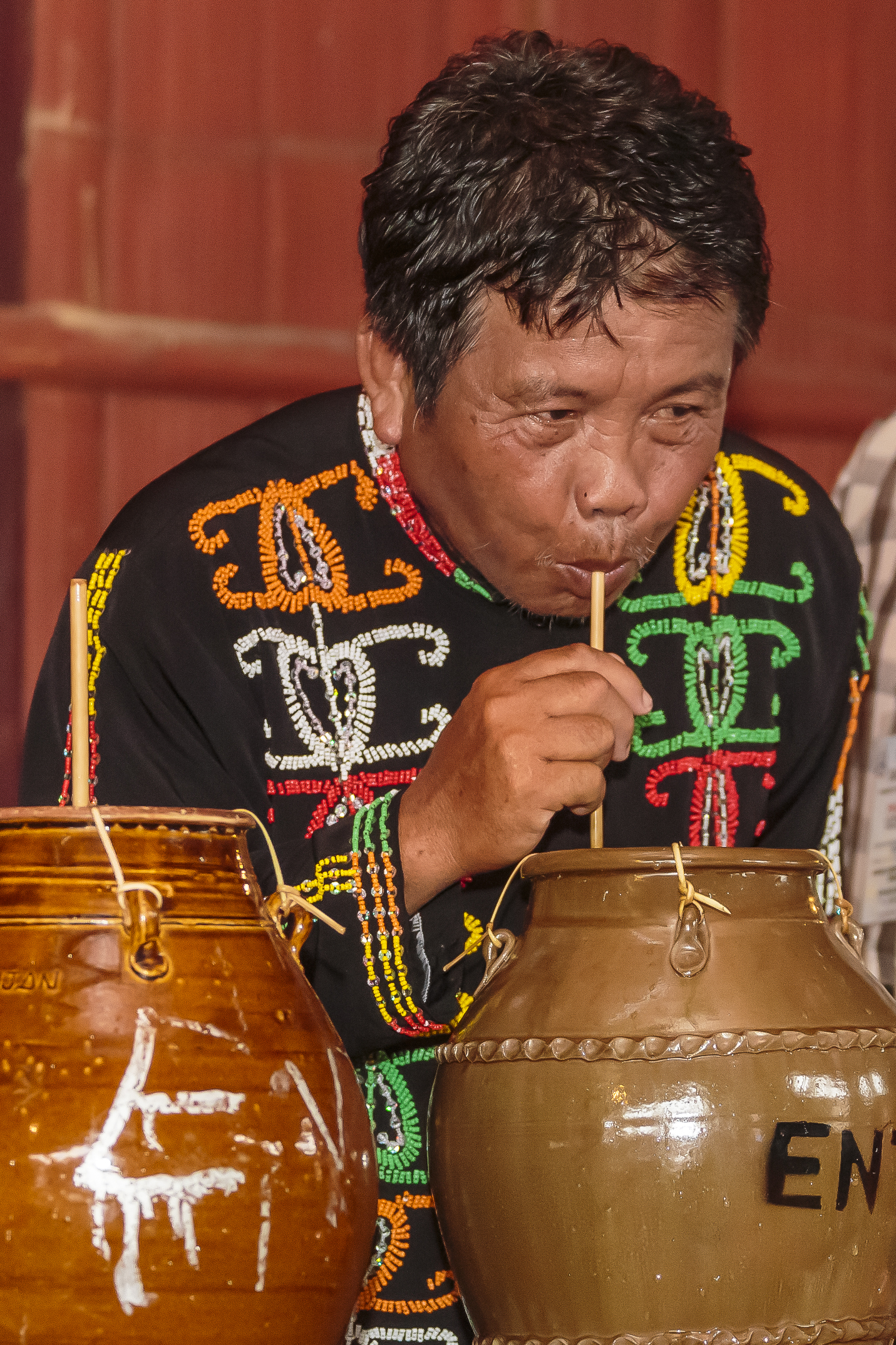
- An indigenous Dusun person taking a sip of tapai from a jar
- Type: Rice wine
- Other names: siopon, tumpung
- Origin: Sabah, Malaysia, (Interior Division, West Coast Division, Sandakan Division, Tawau Division)
- Alcohol by volume: 17% to 30%
- Colour: Cloudy, milky-white, or yellowish-white
- Flavour: Bittersweet
- Ingredients: Single polished rice (old rice), normal rice or brown rice mixed with laru or ragi (yeast)
- Related products: bahar, lihing and montoku (Sabah), langkau and tuak (Sarawak, Kalimantan, Java, and Sumatra), saguer (Maluku Islands and New Guinea)

Within Borneo Island, tapai are specifically known as the local rice wine among the indigenous Kadazan-Dusun, Murut, Paitan, and Rungus. It is considered an integral part of the indigenous communal gatherings and festivals, especially during Kaamatan. In Sabah, tapai is considered a local drink speciality together with bahar, lihing and montoku. Other names for the tapai in Sabah are the siopon and tumpung, where the latter uses a single container to sip, rather than the siopon method from the jar as a precautionary measure to avoid contracting contractable diseases such as tuberculosis (TB).

== Uses in cuisine ==
=== Brunei, Malaysia, and Singapore ===
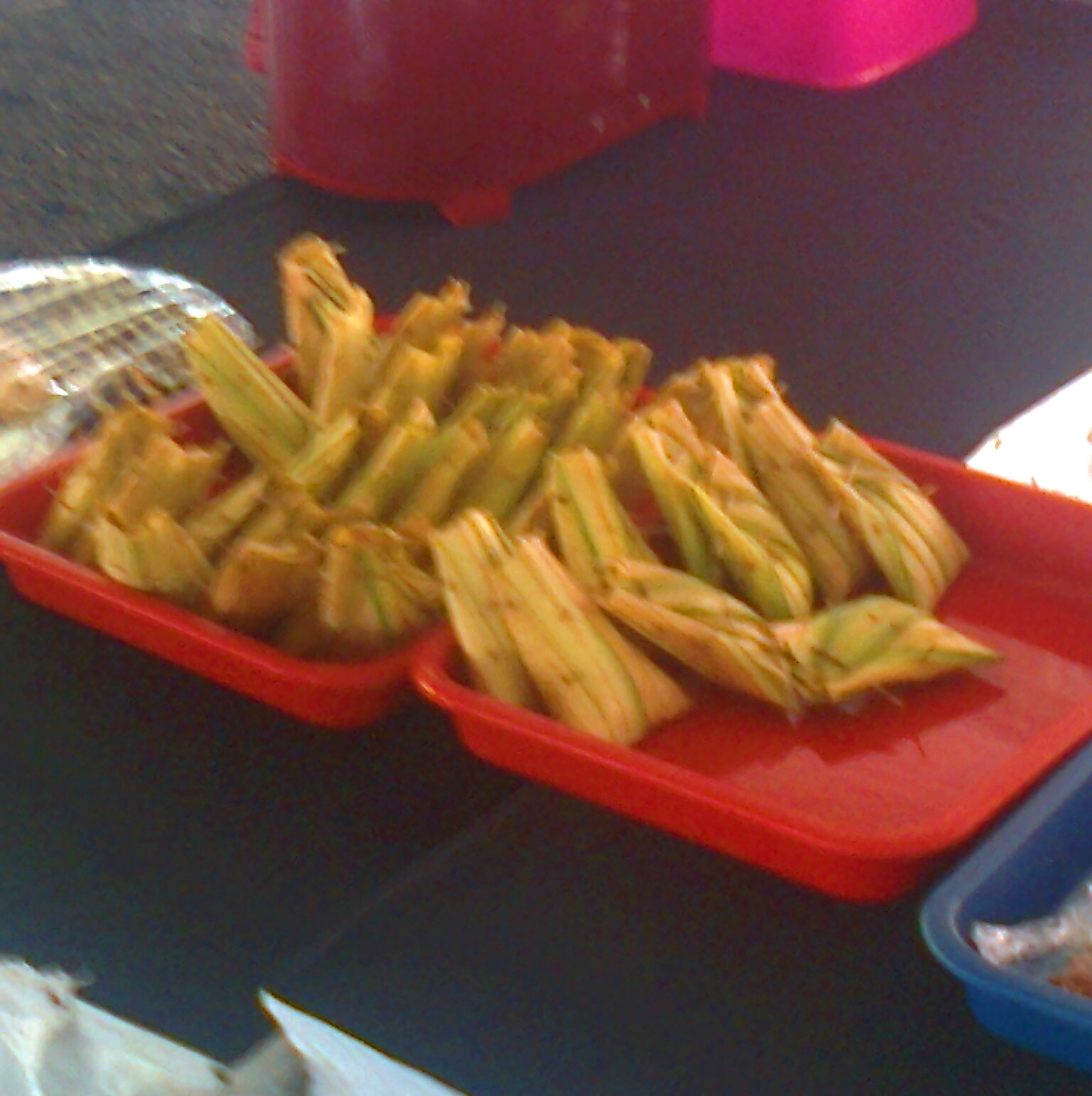
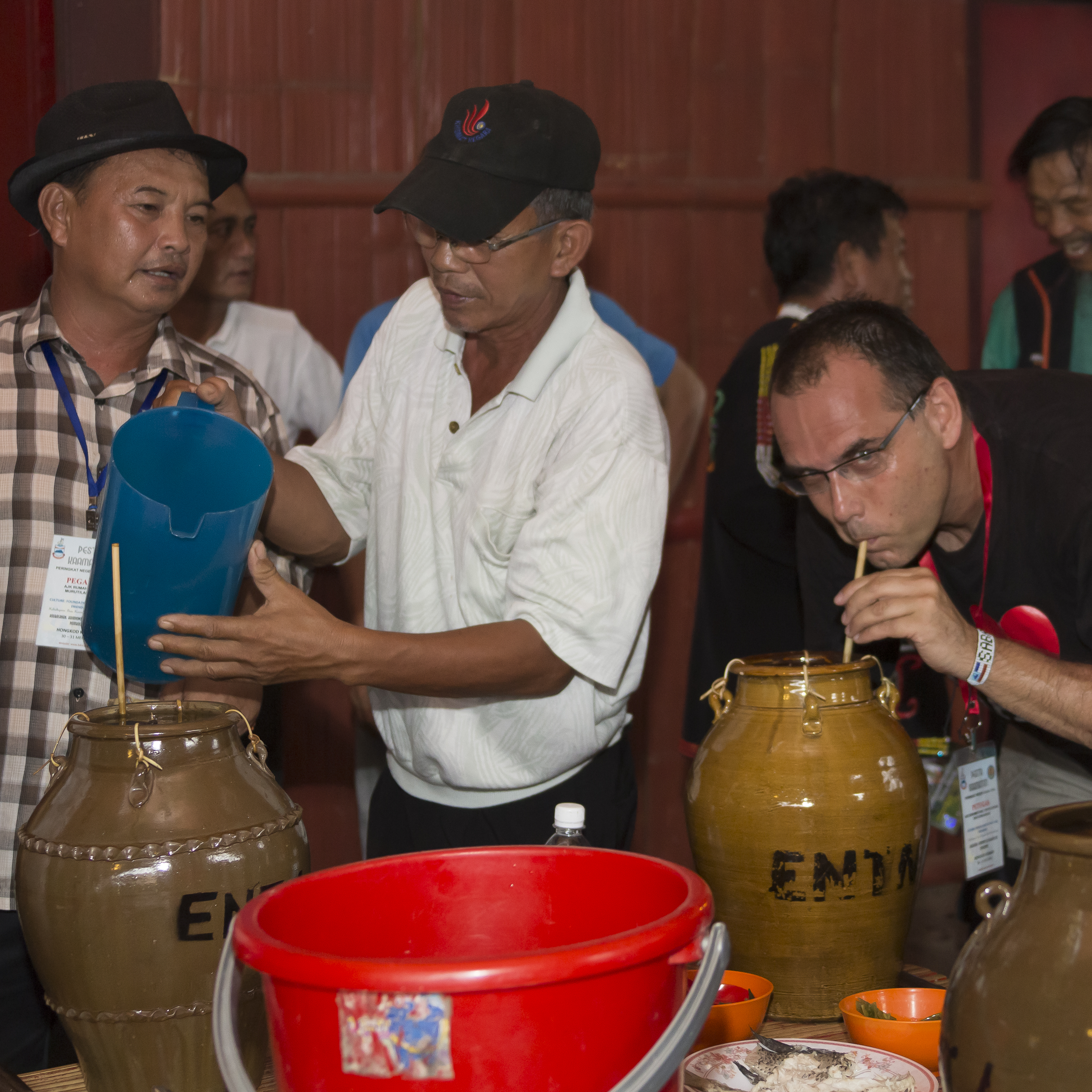
(Left) Tapai pulut wrapped in leaves served during a reception in Sabah, Malaysia
(Right) Guests sipping the tapai from a jar using a straw during the Kaamatan festival in Penampang District, Sabah, Malaysia

Within the three countries, tapai is commonly associated with the tapai pulut dessert, a type of local kuih commonly found at local street hawkers, the tamu (weekly market) and during local ceremonies and wedding receptions, where it is a local type of fermented food which holds significant cultural and culinary importance. Within Malaysia, there are three common types of tapai dessert known as tapai pulut, tapai nasi, and tapai ubi, wherein in the past there were also taboos followed by the elderly when making the dessert for it to taste good, such as the glutinous rice should be kept away from oil and making sure the pot for fermenting the tapai is dry and not oily; the person wrapping it also should not be chewing betel nut or go near any red objects since this will cause the contents of the tapai to turn red and not taste good to eat. Another taboo is when wrapping the tapai, one should also not eat things that taste sour since it will directly cause the tapai to turn sour. Similar to West Malaysia, tapai in Sarawak referred to fermented glutinous rice or cassava.

The rice tapai is known as kinomulok in the Dusunic languages. Aside from the traditional dessert, tapai in the form of an alcoholic beverage is widely consumed by the indigenous communities of Sabah. In Sabah, it is called either tapai or tumpung which is different from lihing due to the type of rice that was used in the making, with lihing commonly using glutinous rice while tapai uses regular brown rice with alcohol level from 10% to 20%. It is made by cooking rice (either brown rice or single polished rice, an old rice from the langkau rice storage of the Dusun people) or cassava, mixing it with a traditional yeast starter called sasad or ragi, and leaving it to ferment in jars. Another alcoholic drink derived from tapai is the linutau, which is made from the leftover of tapai rice that will be wrapped in cloth and squeezed and release a white liquid juice that looks like milk, which is more viscous but has a stronger aroma and is said to be more satisfying to drink, with alcohol content reaching up to 17%. In Brunei, tapai rice wine is also consumed by the indigenous Brunei Dusun as well as to some Bruneian Malay despite living under a conservative, majority-Muslim sultanate where it is enjoyed in a low-alcohol form at home since the public sale of alcoholic drink is not permitted.

=== Indonesia ===
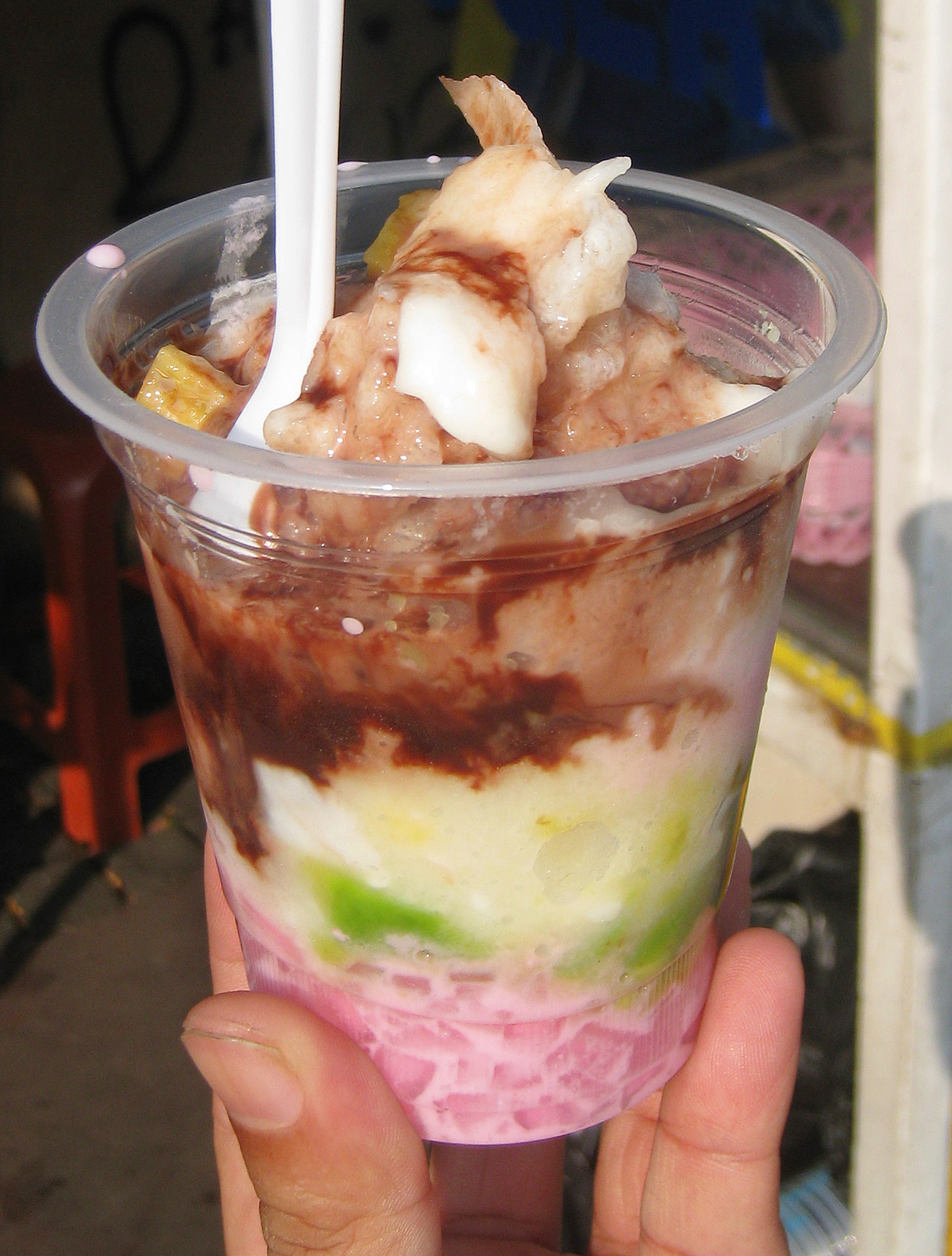
Peuyeum (cassava tapai) as part of es doger sweet iced concoction dessert

Tapai and its variants are usually consumed as it is; as sweet mildly-alcoholic snacks, to accompany tea in the afternoon. The sweet fermented tapai however, are often used as the ingredient in a recipe of certain dishes. Sundanese cassava peuyeum is the main ingredient for colenak; a roasted fermented cassava tapai served with kinca a sweet syrup made of grated coconut and liquid palm sugar. Colenak is Sundanese portmanteau of dicocol enak which translates to "tasty dip". Tapai uli is a roasted block of bland-tasted ketan or pulut (glutinous rice) served with sweet tapai ketan or tapai pulut. The peuyeum goreng or tapai goreng, or known in Javanese as rondho royal is another example of Indonesian gorengan (assorted fritters), which is deep fried battered cassava tapai. Lemang tapai is another specialty among the local Minangkabau, which consists of both lemang and tapai that are used in various traditional ceremonies of the ethnic. Another is the tapai singkong (fermented steamed cassava).

In beverages, tapai, both cassava or glutinous rice, might be added into sweet iced concoction desserts, such as es campur and es doger.

=== Philippines ===
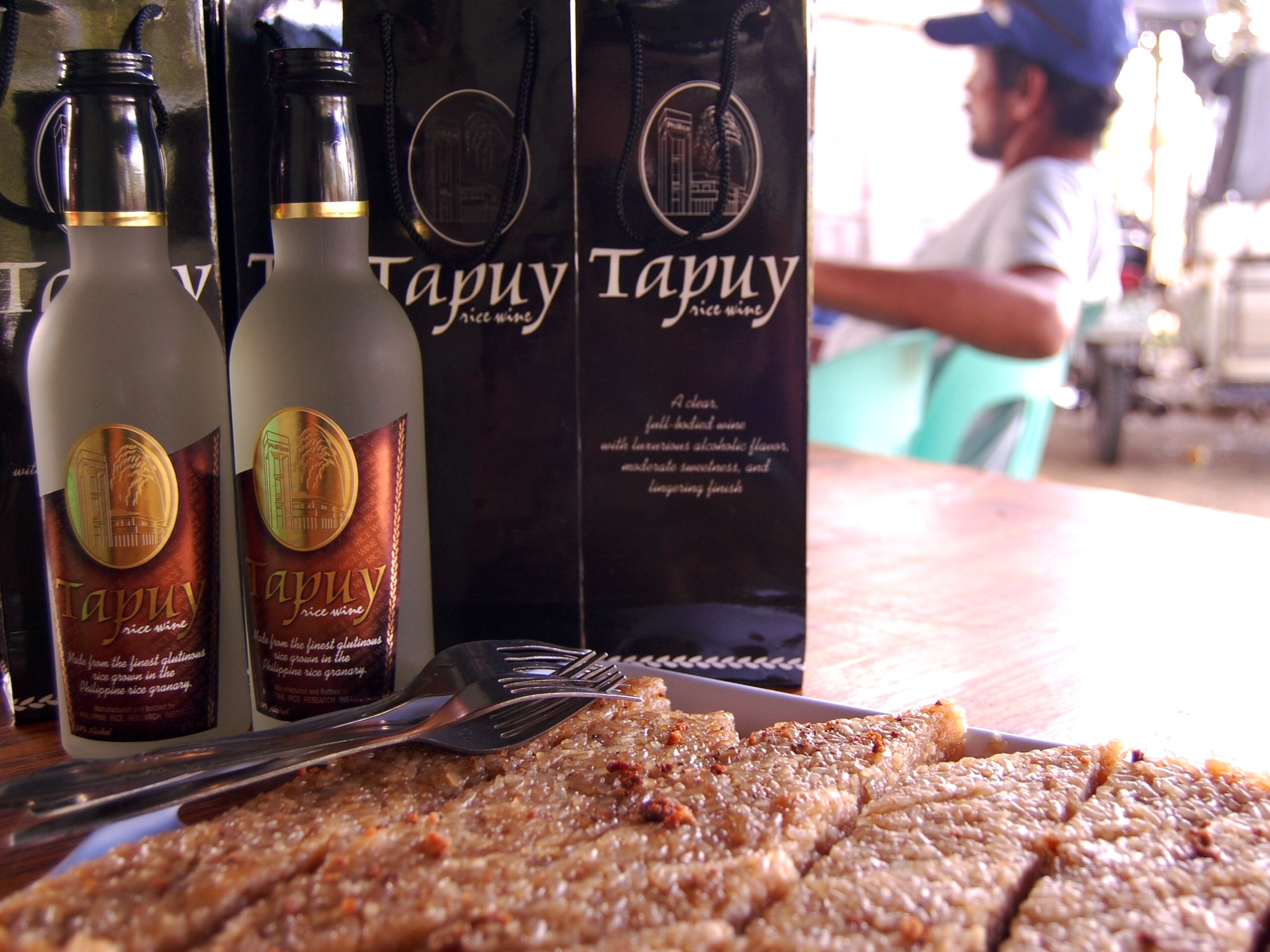
Tapuy, a traditional Ifugao rice wine prepared with tapay in the Cordillera highlands of Luzon, Philippines

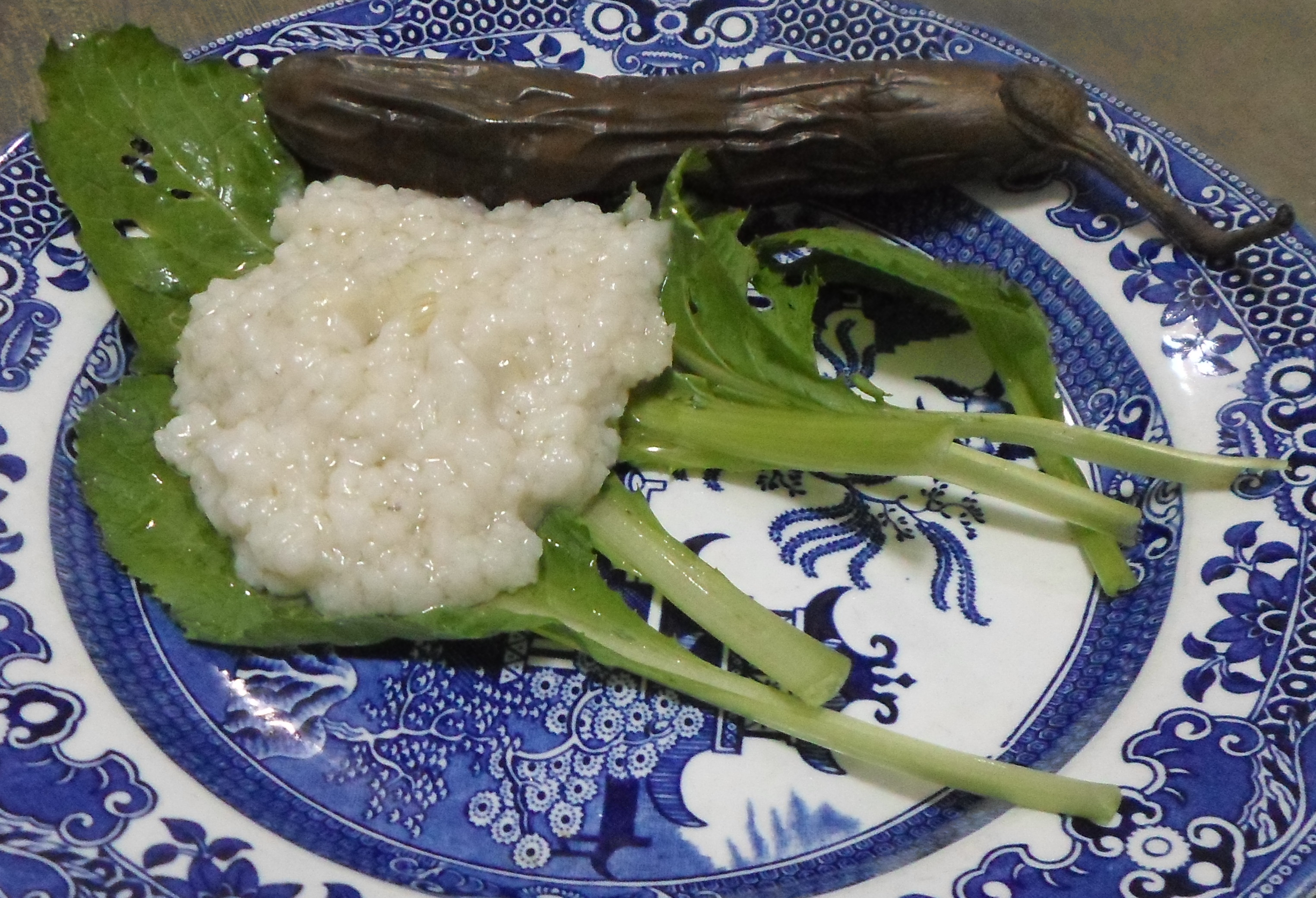
Buro, fermented rice, with a grilled eggplant and mustard leaves from Kapampangan cuisine in the Philippines

In the Philippines, there are various tapay-derived dishes and drinks. They were originally referred to by the term tinapay (literally "done through tapay), as recorded by Antonio Pigafetta. But the term tinapay is now restricted to "bread" in modern Filipino languages. The most common use of fermented rice is in galapong, a traditional Filipino viscous rice dough made by soaking (and usually fermenting) uncooked glutinous rice overnight and then grinding it into a paste. It is used as a base for various kakanin rice cakes (notably puto and bibingka).

Fermented gruel-type tapay are also common, with various ethnic groups having their own versions like Tagalog and Kapampangan buro, the Ifugao binuburan, and the Maranao and Maguindanao tapay. These are usually traditionally fermented with or paired with fish or shrimp (similar to Japanese narezushi), as in burong isda, balao-balao, or tinapayan. Rice wines derived from tapay include the basi of Ilocos and the tapuy of Banaue and Mountain Province. Tapuy is itself the end product of binuburan allowed to ferment fully.

== See also ==
- List of alcoholic drinks
- List of fermented foods
- List of rice dishes
- Amazake – Japanese drink made from fermented rice
- Bahar (drink) – Traditional palm wine of the Dusun from Sabah, Malaysia
- Cơm rượu – Vietnamese dessert made from glutinous rice
- Jiuniang – Chinese rice pudding dish
- Langkau – Traditional rice wine of the Dayak and Iban from Sarawak, Malaysia
- Lihing – Traditional rice wine of the Kadazan-Dusun from Sabah, Malaysia
- Montoku (drink) – Traditional rice wine of the Kadazan-Dusun and Rungus from Sabah, Malaysia
- Rượu nếp – Rice-based pudding or drink from Vietnam
- Kvass – Fermented low-alcoholic beverage
- Sake – Alcoholic beverage of Japanese origin
- Tapayan – Earthenware or stoneware jars
- Tapuy – Fermented rice wine from the Luzon highlands in the Philippines
- Tuak – Traditional palm or rice wine of Indonesia and Malaysia
