= List of Indonesian drinks =

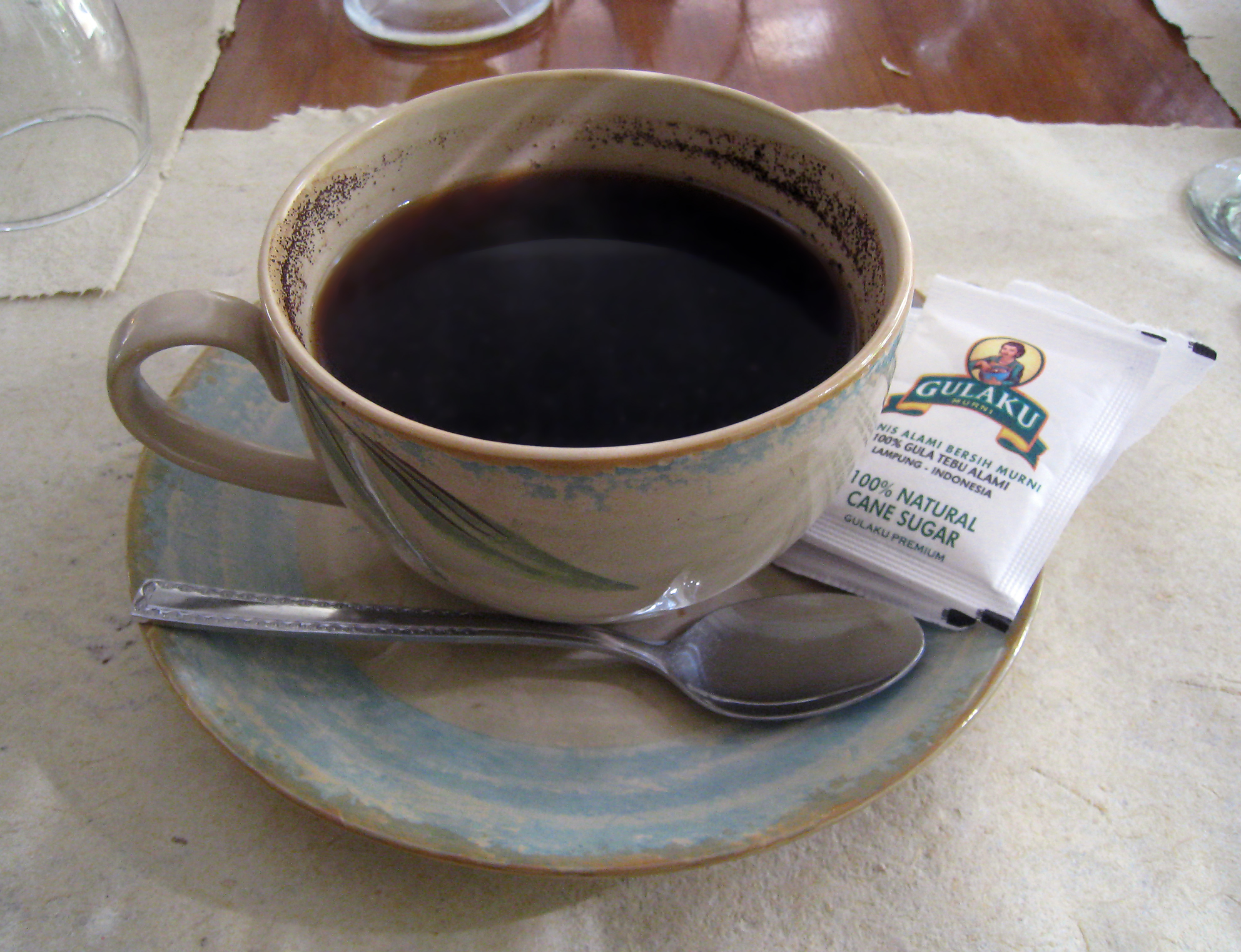
A cup of Java coffee, Javanese kopi tubruk

This is a list of Indonesian drinks. The most common and popular Indonesian drinks and beverages are teh (tea) and kopi (coffee). Indonesian households commonly serve teh manis (sweet tea) or kopi tubruk (coffee mixed with sugar and hot water and poured straight in the glass without separating out the coffee residue) to guests. Fruit juices (jus) are very popular, and hot sweet beverages can also be found, such as bajigur and bandrek.

Many popular drinks are based on ice (es) and can also be classified as desserts. Typical examples include young coconut (es kelapa muda), grass jelly (es cincau) and cendol (es cendol or es dawet). As a Muslim-majority country, Indonesian Muslims share Islamic dietary laws that prohibit alcoholic beverages. However, since ancient times, local alcoholic beverages were developed in the archipelago. According to a Chinese source, people of ancient Java drank wine made from palm sap called tuak (palm wine).

== Hot beverages ==
Name	Image	Region	Type	Description
Air guraka		Ternate, North Maluku	Hot ginger drink	A ginger drink mixed with palm sugar and walnuts.
Bajigur		West Java	Hot sweet drink	Coconut sugar and coconut milk hot drink.
Bandrek		West Java	Hot sweet drink	A coconut sugar and ginger hot drink with bits of young coconut.
Java coffee				
Jahe Telor				A drink made of ginger and raw egg. Some variants colloquially known as STMJ (Susu Telor Madu Jahe or "milk egg honey ginger").
Kembang tahu		Nationwide		Tofu pudding with sweet ginger soup
Kopi dabe		Tidore, North Maluku	Coffee beverage	Coffee beverage mixed with ginger, nutmeg, cinnamon, clove, and pandan leaves.
Kopi durian		Sumatra	Coffee beverage	Coffee beverage mixed with durian as a replacement of sugar
Kopi hijau		Tulungagung, East Java	Coffee beverage	
Kopi jahe		Nationwide	Coffee beverage	Coffee beverage mixed with ginger
Kopi joss		Yogyakarta	Coffee beverage	Unrestrained coffee beverage served with a piece of burning charcoal immersed
Kopi kasar/kopyok		Gresik, East Java	Coffee beverage	
Kopi kawa		West Sumatra	Coffee beverage	Not an actual coffee; it's a beverage made of roasted coffee leaves
Kopi khop		Aceh	Coffee beverage	
Kopi kothok		Cepu, Central Java; Padangan, East Java	Coffee beverage	
Kopi lelet		Lasem, Central Java	Coffee beverage	
Kopi luwak		Sumatra, Java, Sulawesi, and Nusa Tenggara	Coffee beverage	Coffee beverage made of beans that are already digested by palm civet.
Kopi pala		Banda Islands	Coffee beverage	Coffee beverage mixed with nutmeg
Kopi pinogu		Suwawa, Gorontalo	Coffee beverage	
Kopi rarobang		Ambon, Maluku	Coffee beverage	Coffee beverage mixed with spices and walnuts
Kopi sanger		Aceh	Coffee beverage	Pulled coffee and milk
Kopi santan		Blora, Central Java	Coffee beverage	Coffee beverage mixed with coconut milk
Kopi talua		West Sumatra	Coffee beverage	Hot coffee beverage mixed blended egg yolk
Kopi takar		Mandailing Natal, North Sumatra	Coffee beverage	Coffee beverage and palm sugar served with cinnamon stick and coconut cup
Kopi tarik		Riau Islands	Coffee beverage	Pulled coffee and milk
Kopi tubruk		Java	Coffee beverage	Hot coffee beverage mix straight with coffee powder without straining.
Sara'ba		South Sulawesi, Makassar	Hot Drink	A drink made of palm sugar/brown sugar and ginger. It can be mixed with coconut milk, milk or raw egg yolk.
Sekoteng		Chinese Indonesian, Nationwide	Hot ginger drink	A hot drink made of ginger, sugar and milk with peanuts, slices of bread, and pacar cina.
Serbat				
Susu jahe pinang			Milk beverage	A hot drink made of milk, ginger, and areca palm fruit
Susu Telur Madu Jahe (STMJ)		Central Java, East Java	Milk beverage	A hot drink made of milk, egg yolk, honey and ginger
Teh bawang dayak		Kalimantan	Herbal tea beverage	A herbal tea made from dried shallot peels.
Teh manis panas			Tea beverage	A hot tea mixed with sugar.
Teh poci		Tegal	Tea beverage	Hot tea served in clay teapot with large crystallized sugar.
Teh sarang semut		Merauke, Papua	Herbal tea beverage	A herbal tea made from musamus or Macrotermes house.
Teh talua		West Sumatra	Tea beverage	Mixed of hot tea and blended egg yolk.
Teh tarik		Riau Islands	Tea beverage	Pulled sweet milk tea
Wedang angsle		East Java		
Wedang jahe		Central Java	Ginger tea/drink	Made of fresh ginger, boiled and mixed with palm sugar or granulated cane sugar. Served hot or warm.
Wedang kacang tanah		Semarang		A hot drink made from peanuts.
Wedang ronde		Yogyakarta	Hot ginger drink	
Wedang tape		Central Java, East Java		A hot drink made from tape (glutinous rice tape or cassava tape).
Wedang uwuh		Yogyakarta		

== Cold beverages ==
Name	Image	Region	Type	Description
Beras kencur		Java	Herbal drink	Made from rice, turmeric, and brown sugar.
Bir kocok		Bogor, West Java	Ginger drink	Shaken ginger drink with ice
Bir pletok		Jakarta	Ginger drink	Shaken ginger drink with ice
Dadiah		West Sumatra	Yoghurt	Traditional West Sumatran water buffalo milk yoghurt.
Es asam jawa or air gula asam		Central Java and Yogyakarta	Tamarind drink	A cold drink made from the juice of asam jawa served with palm sugar and ice.
Es air mata pengantin		Riau	Cold drink	A cold drink consists of the three layer colorful grated agar jelly and basil seeds.
Es blewah		Nationwide	Fruit cocktail	A cold drink made from the fruit of blewah.
Es buah		Nationwide	Fruit cocktail	A cold drink from fruit, ice, syrup and condensed milk
Es campur		Nationwide	Sweet dessert	Shaved ice with coconut pieces, various fruits (usually jackfruit), grass jelly, syrup and condensed milk
Es cao		Central Java and East Java	Jelly drink	A cold drink made from black grass jelly with cocopandan syrup.
Es cendol		Nationwide	Sweet jelly drink	Rice flour jelly with green natural coloring from pandan leaf, mixed with coconut milk, shaved ice and palm/brown sugar
Es cincau		Nationwide	Jelly drink	Grass jelly and shredded ice with sugar or syrup.
Es dawet		Banjarnegara, Central Java	Cold dessert	
Es doger		Bandung, West Java	Cold sweet dessert	
Es durian		Nationwide	Cold sweet dessert	
Es goyobod		West Java	Cold sweet dessert	
Es gempol		Central Java	Cold sweet dessert	Rice flour dough doused with coconut milk soup
Es jeruk		Nationwide	Cold drink	Juice of sweet orange with sugar and ice
Es kelacin		West Sulawesi	Cold drink	Flesh coconut mixed with green grass jelly in an iced coconut milk soup.
Es kelapa muda		Nationwide	Cold drink	Fresh young coconut, coconut water mixed with or without syrup. Usually served intact whole fruit
Es kopi susu gula aren		Nationwide	Cold drink	Iced coffee with milk and palm sugar.
Es kuwut		Bali	Cold drink	Consists of coconut, citrus, honeydew, and selasih (basil seeds).
Es laksamana mengamuk		Riau Islands	Cold dessert	Fresh mango with milk.
Es lidah buaya		West Kalimantan	Cold drink	Made from aloe vera, French basil, Javanese black jelly, coconut milk, palm sugar, pandanus leaf, and sugar.
Es matoa		Papua	Cold drink	Made from matoa fruit, kolang-kaling (aren palm fruit), and jelly.
Es omu		Gorontalo	Cold drink	Made from coconut flesh, coconut water, and palm sugar.
Es pisang ijo		South Sulawesi	Cold dessert	Sweet green battered banana with rice pudding.
Es puter		Java	Ice cream	Ice cream that made from coconut milk with a rough texture and traditionally frozen.
Es samudra		Dumai, Riau	Cold drink	Consists of white bread, durian, seaweed, and cocopandan syrup.
Es sekemu		Banten	Cold drink	Consists of coconut water, coconut flesh, sapodilla, and basil seeds.
Es selendang mayang		Jakarta	Cold dessert	Iced coconut milk soup with rice and palm flour jelly.
Es serbat kweni		Lampung	Cold drink	Made from mango kweni and palm sugar.
Es sinom		Surabaya	Cold drink	Made from sinom (tamarind leaves), turmeric, and sugar.
Es siwalan		Nationwide	Cold dessert	Sweet and chewy palm fruit, served with basil seed and flavored syrup.
Es sunset papua		Papua	Cold drink	Mixed of orange juice, carrot juice, syrup, and basil seeds.
Es teh tarik		Riau Islands	Sweet iced tea	Sweet pulled milk tea with ice
Es tebu		Java		Extract of sugarcane with ice.
Es teler		Nationwide		A mixed of avocado, young coconut, jack fruit, shredded iced with sweet condensed milk.
Es timun serut		Aceh	Cold drink	Made from cucumber.
Jamu		Nationwide	Herbal drink	
Jus alpukat		Nationwide	Juice	Avocado juice with chocolate condensed milk.
Jus buah naga		Nationwide	Juice	Purple pitaya juice
Jus belimbing		Depok, West Java	Juice	Carambola juice
Jus gandaria		Ambon	Juice	Mango-plum juice.
Jus lidah buaya		Depok, West Java	Juice	Aloe vera juice.
Jus martabe		Medan	Juice	Mixed of passion fruit juice and tamarillo juice.
Jus patikala		Southeast Sulawesi	Juice	Kecombrang fruit juice
Jus rumput laut		Depok, West Java	Juice	Edible seaweed juice.
Jus tala'		Jeneponto	Juice	Palmyra fruit juice.
Jus terung belanda		Sumatra and Sulawesi	Juice	Tamarillo juice.
Lahang		West Java	Cold sweet beverage	Drink made from Arenga pinnata (aren) sap.
Legen		East Java		A drink made of Siwalan palm sap.
Liang teh		Chinese Indonesian, Medan, North Sumatra	Sweet iced tea	
Minas		Sinjai	Cold drink	A drink made from tapai, milk, duck egg, coconut water, and honey.
Sari temulawak		Java	Herbal drink	A juice of Java ginger.
Soda gembira		Nationwide	Cold drink	
Sweet iced tea (es teh manis)		Nationwide	Cold drink	

== Alcoholic beverages ==
Name	Image	Region	Type	Description
Anggur		Nationwide		Sweet wine produced by Orang Tua brand
Arak		Nationwide		
Balo		South Sulawesi		
Bir Bintang		Nationwide	Beer	Local brand beer
Brem		Bali; Madiun (solid form)	Sweet alcoholic beverage	Brem is made from fermented tape. Brem is a special beverage from Bali. Usually brem also present in solid form as snacks.
Cap Tikus		North Sulawesi		
Ciu		Central Java		
Congyang		Semarang, Central Java		
Cukrik		Surabaya, East Java		
Lapen		Yogyakarta		
Moke		Flores, East Nusa Tenggara		
Saguer		North Sulawesi		
Sopi		Maluku; East Nusa Tenggara		
Swansrai		Papua		
Tuak		Nationwide		

Indonesian beverages

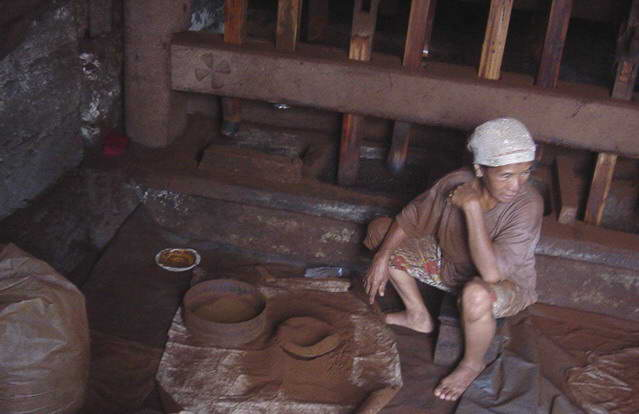
Making coffee by hand in Sumatra, Indonesia

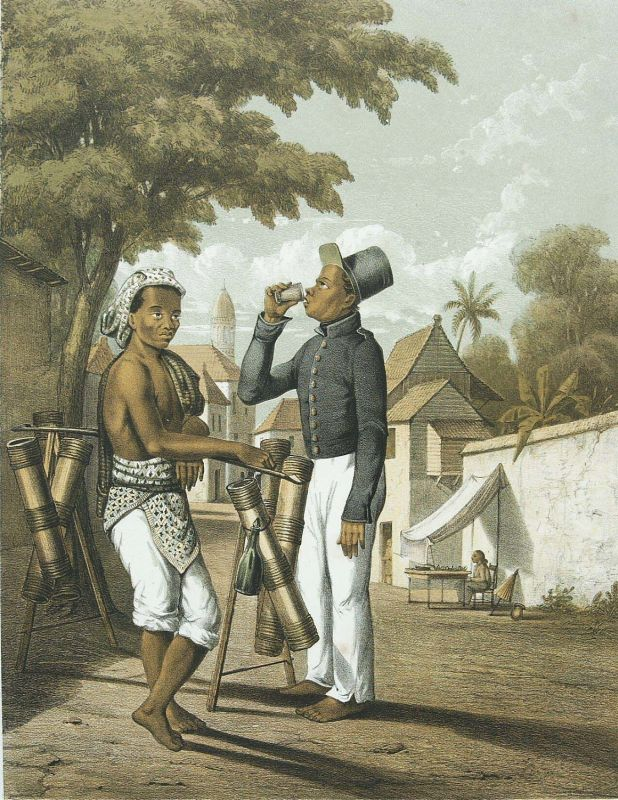
An illustration of a Royal Netherlands East Indies Army soldier drinking tuak sold by a vendor

== See also ==
- Alcohol in Indonesia
- Coffee production in Indonesia
- Indonesian cuisine
- List of Indonesian dishes
