= Es kelapa muda =

Indonesian coconut ice

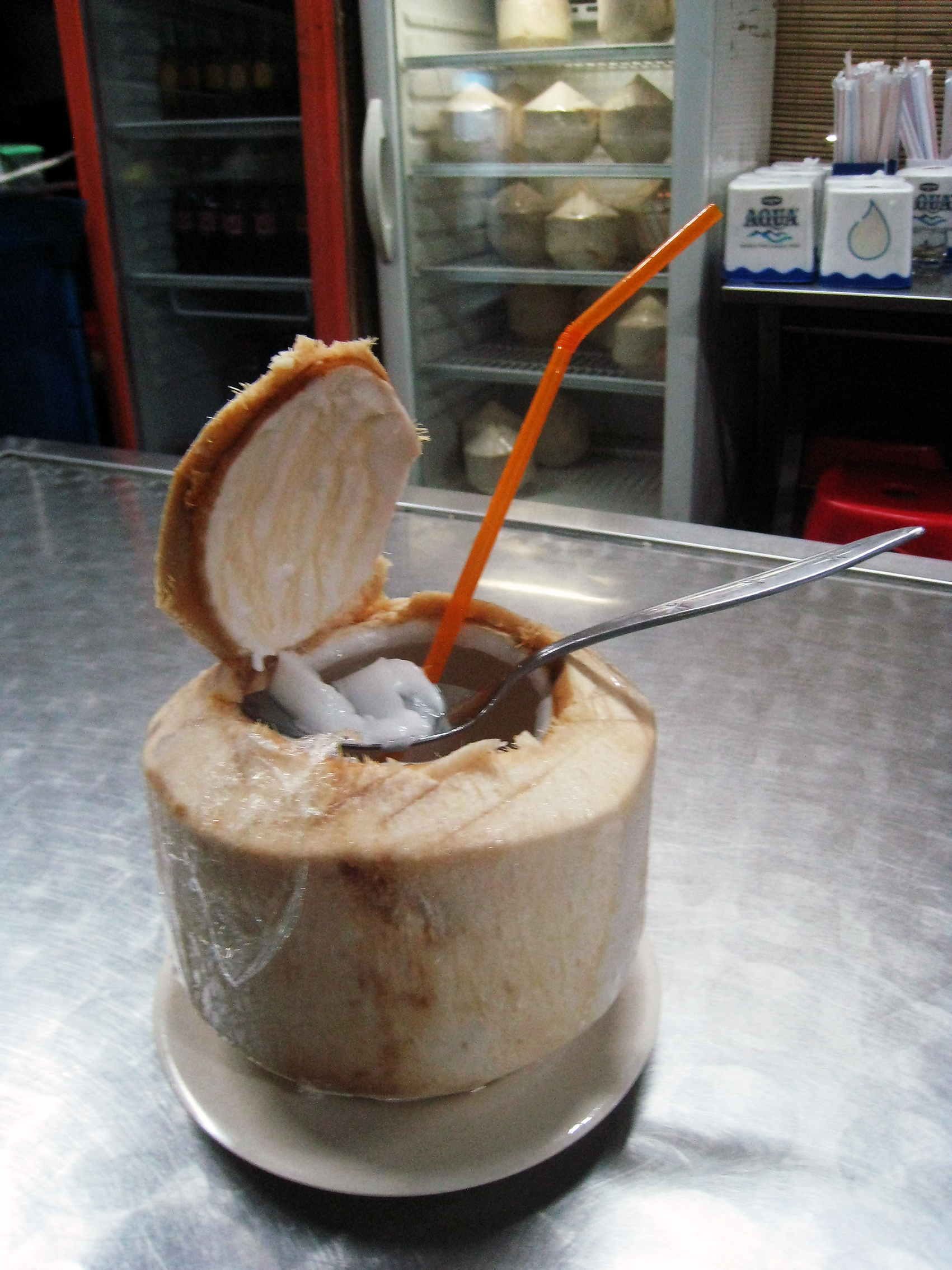
- A young coconut beverage
- Type: Cold
- Origin: Indonesia
- Color: clear or yellowish white from sugar or syrup

Es kelapa muda (Javanese: es degan, English: young coconut ice or coconut ice) is a beverage made from chilled or iced coconut water, young coconut flesh and syrup. It is among the most popular beverages in Indonesia. Es kelapa muda is included in the world's 50 most delicious drinks according to CNN on December 9, 2011, ranking 19th.

Liquid sugar, syrup or honey might be used as sweetening agent. The syrup used in this drink is typically cocopandan or vanilla flavored. Some use glass as the container, while traditional es kelapa muda is prepared and drank directly from the whole coconut fruit. Some variants might be spiced up with addition of cinnamon and clove.

In Semarang, the es kelapa muda is commonly mixed with slices of jackfruit and tape.

== Gallery ==
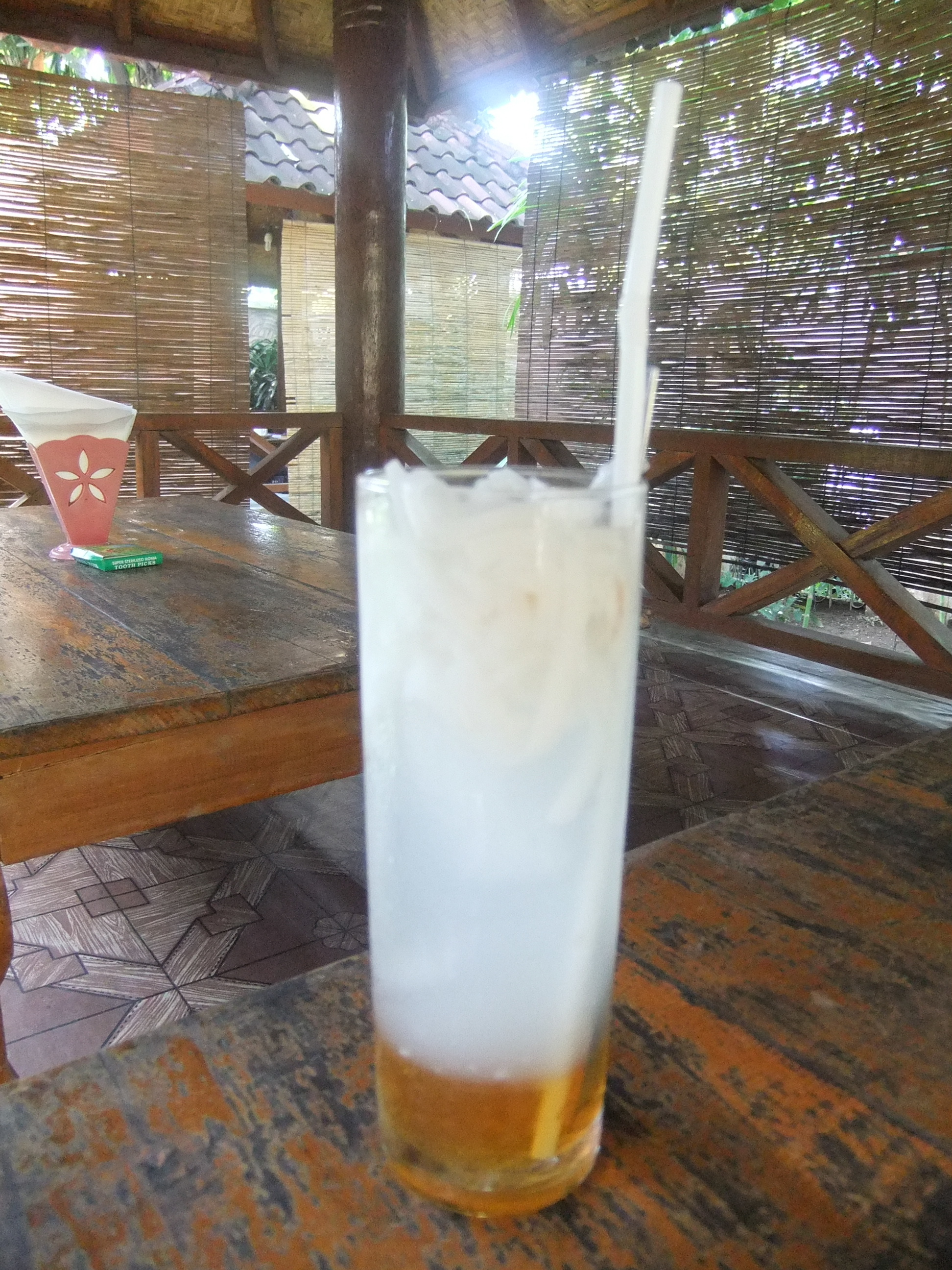
Es kelapa muda with honey

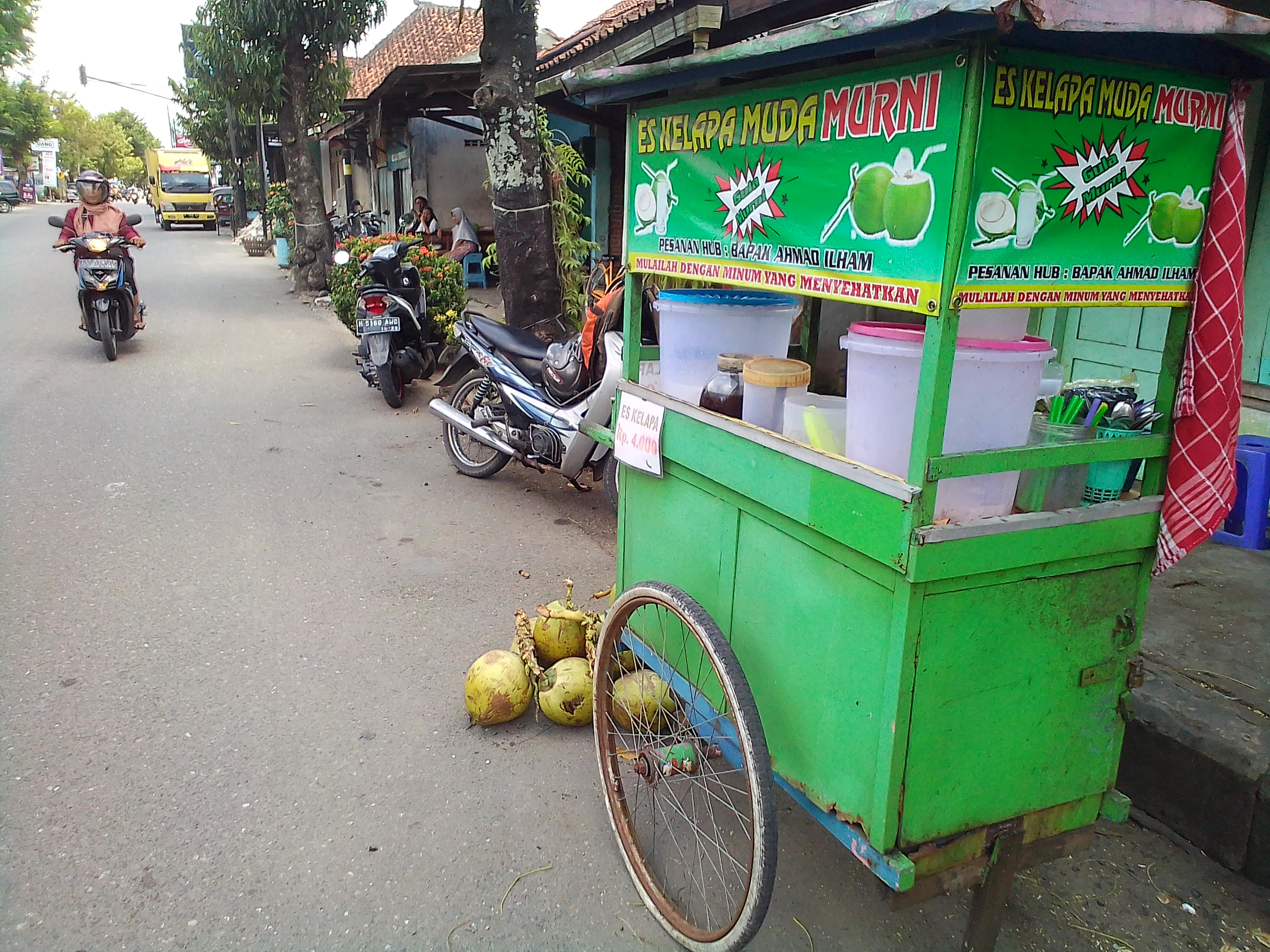
An es kelapa muda street vendor

== See also ==
- Es buah
- Es campur
- Es teler
- List of Indonesian beverages
