= Es goyobod =

Indonesian coconut milk based cold beverage

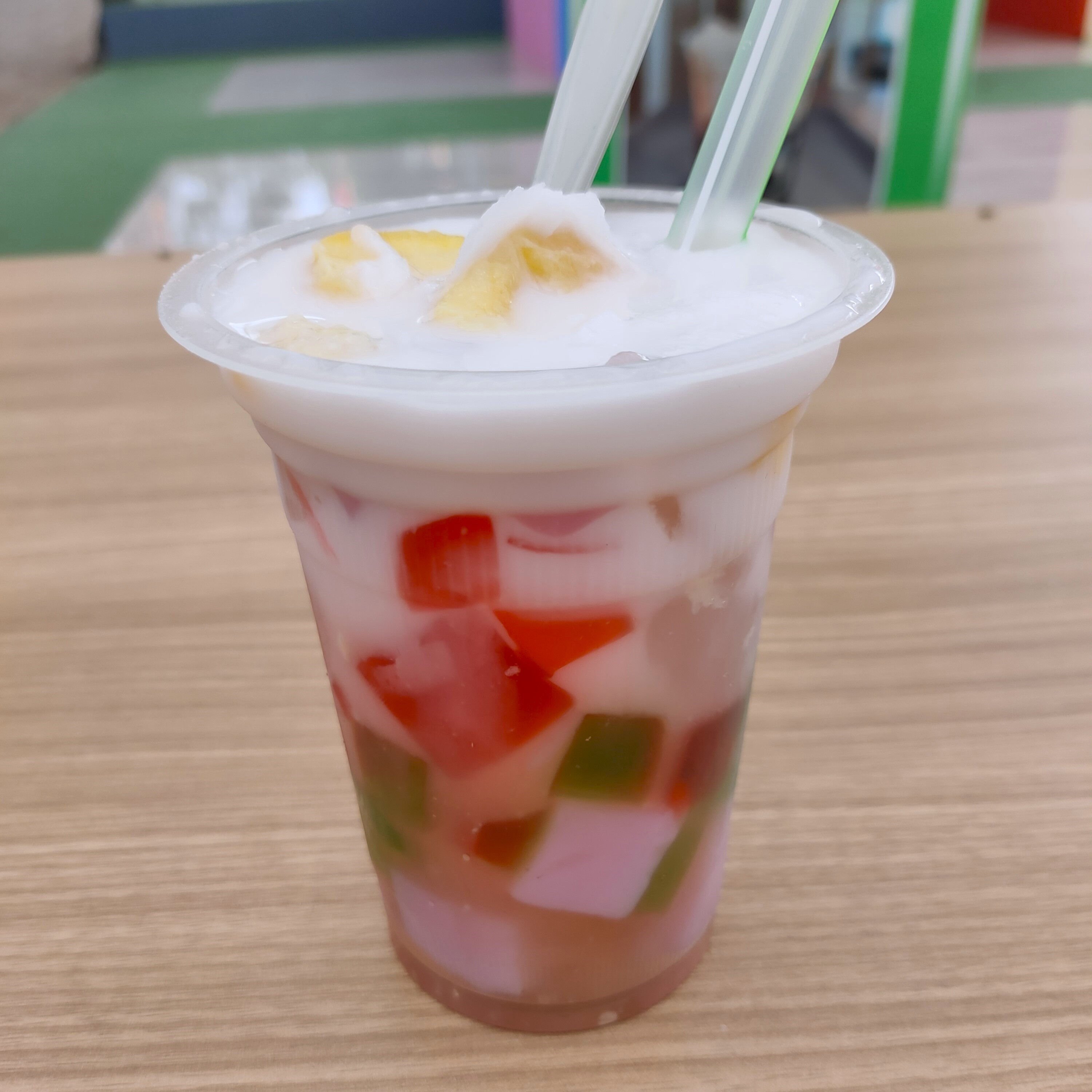
Subang-styled Goyobod

Es goyobod is an Sundanese drink from Indonesia. The origin of coconut milk based cold beverage similar to es campur. It is made with shaved ice, coconut milk, sugar syrup, and jellied mung bean starch known as hunkwe. Other ingredients may include avocado and shredded coconut.

== See also ==
- List of Indonesian beverages
