= Es buah =

Indonesian iced fruit cocktail dessert

Sop Buah
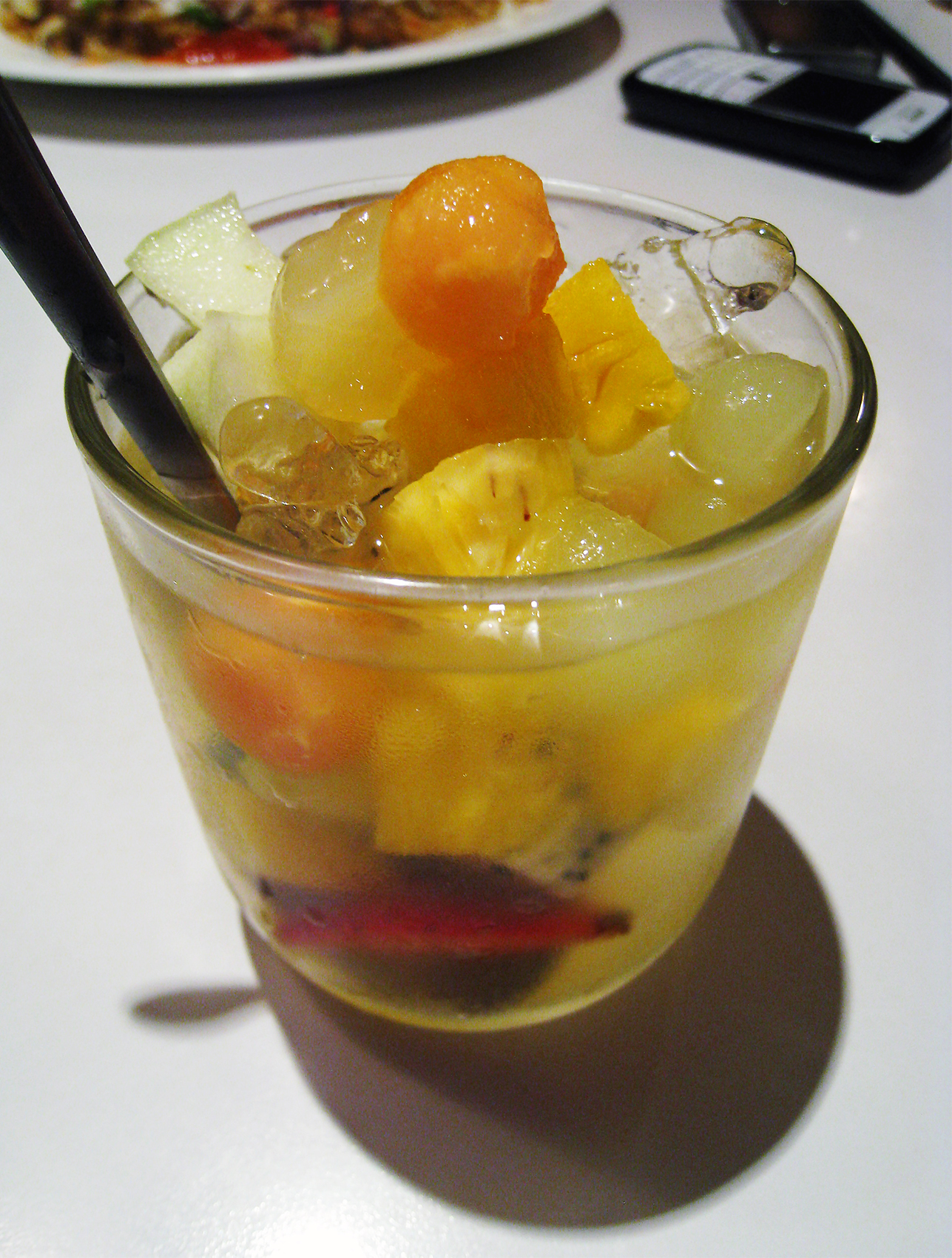
- A glass of sop buah
- Course: Dessert
- Place of origin: Indonesia
- Region or state: Nationwide
- Serving temperature: Cold
- Main ingredients: Mixed fruit bits; honeydew (melon), pineapple, papaya, etc., with shaved ice or ice cube and syrup

Es buah or sop buah is an Indonesian iced fruit cocktail dessert. This cold and sweet beverage is made of diced fruits, such as honeydew, cantaloupe, pineapple, papaya, squash, jackfruit and kolang kaling (Arenga pinnata fruit), mixed with shaved ice or ice cubes, and sweetened with liquid sugar or syrup. The type of fruit used in this dessert may vary, some might add any available fruits such as mango, watermelon or longan — some imported fruits — such as lychee, kiwi, strawberry, pear, peach or grapes. Other ingredients might be added too, such as agar-agar jelly, grass jelly, seaweed or nata de coco. Some preparations also add basil seeds and use sweetened condensed milk or coconut milk in the liquid base.

Sop buah is a popular drink among Indonesians, especially during Ramadhan as a popular choice for iftar — to break the fast among Indonesian Muslims. It is quite similar to es campur and es teler although with different contents.

== See also ==
- Es campur
- Es teler
- Es doger
- Ais kacang
