= Lahang =

Indonesian traditional sweet and cold beverage

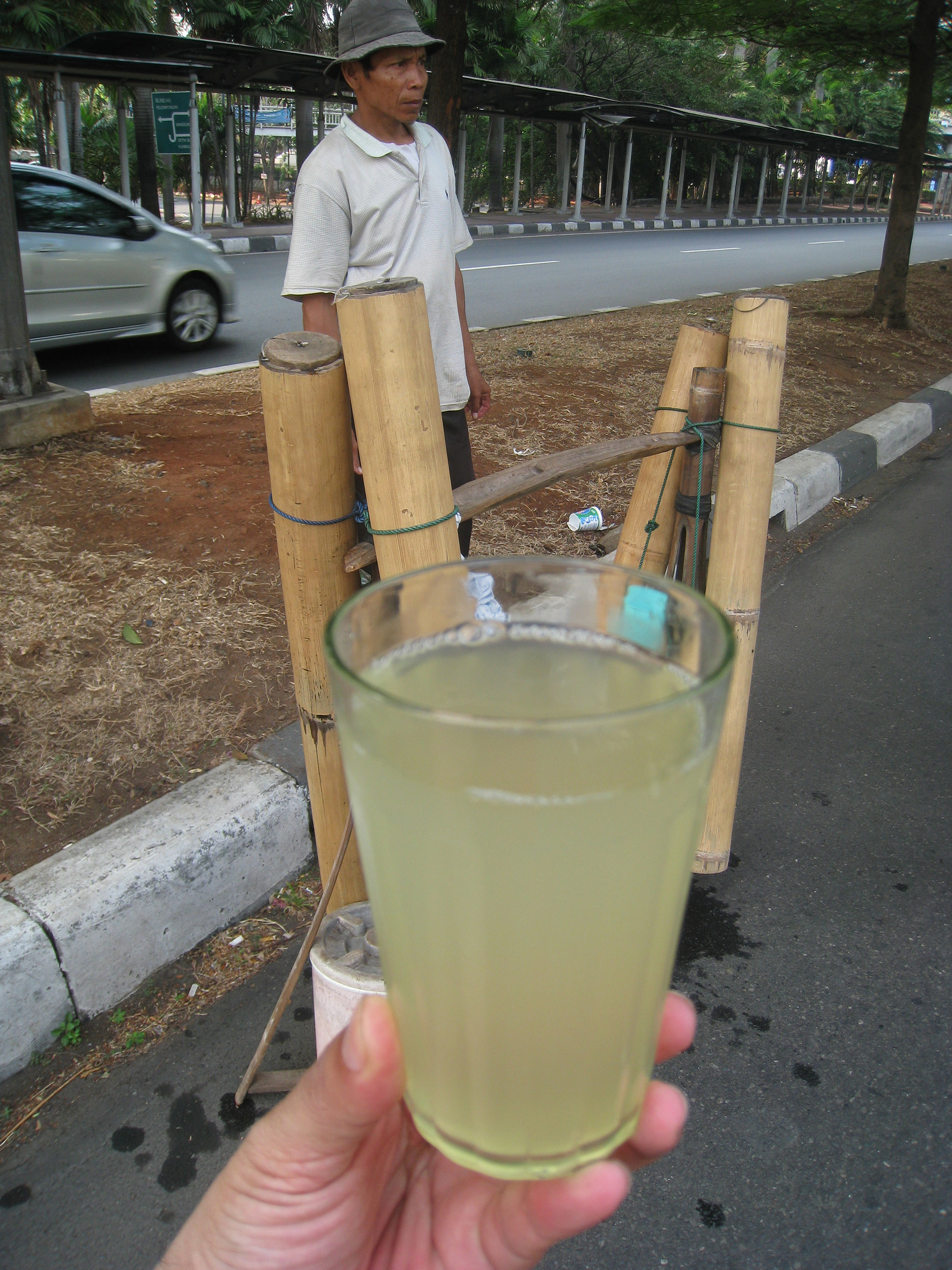
- A glass of street side lahang
- Course: Beverage
- Place of origin: Indonesia
- Region or state: West Java
- Serving temperature: Cold
- Main ingredients: Sap of Arenga pinnata

Lahang is a traditional sweet and cold beverage from West Java, Indonesia, made from the sap of Arenga pinnata (sugar palm or aren). The drink is commonly known in Indonesia; however, it is usually associated with the Sundanese of West Java. It is known as a traditional isotonic drink.

== Production ==
Lahang is obtained through tapping aren or sugar palm trees. The part being tapped are the male flowers of the aren plants. In order to maintain its freshness, farmers will usually start early in the dawn to tap the palm flowers. The optimal age of Arenga tree suitable for tapping is five years or older. Tapping the sap from Aren tree requires skills, prior of attaching the tube, the cob of male flowers must be cleaned to avoid contamination and impurities.

The sap liquid is slowly built up and dripped into the bamboo container. After certain period, the sap would be collected. In certain circumstances when the sap of sugar palm tree is left in open air for too long, the sap liquid will be fermented and turned into vinegar or palm wine.

== Selling ==
The sweet tasting sap then is mixed with ice and ready to be served. Iced lahang is usually sold as refreshment, a street beverage in large bamboo tubes. Lahang usually produced together with gula aren (palm sugar), tuak (palm wine) and dodol sweets, since all of them are the products of aren tree.

== See also ==
- Bajigur
- Teh Jahe
