= Sekoteng =

Indonesian ginger-based hot drink

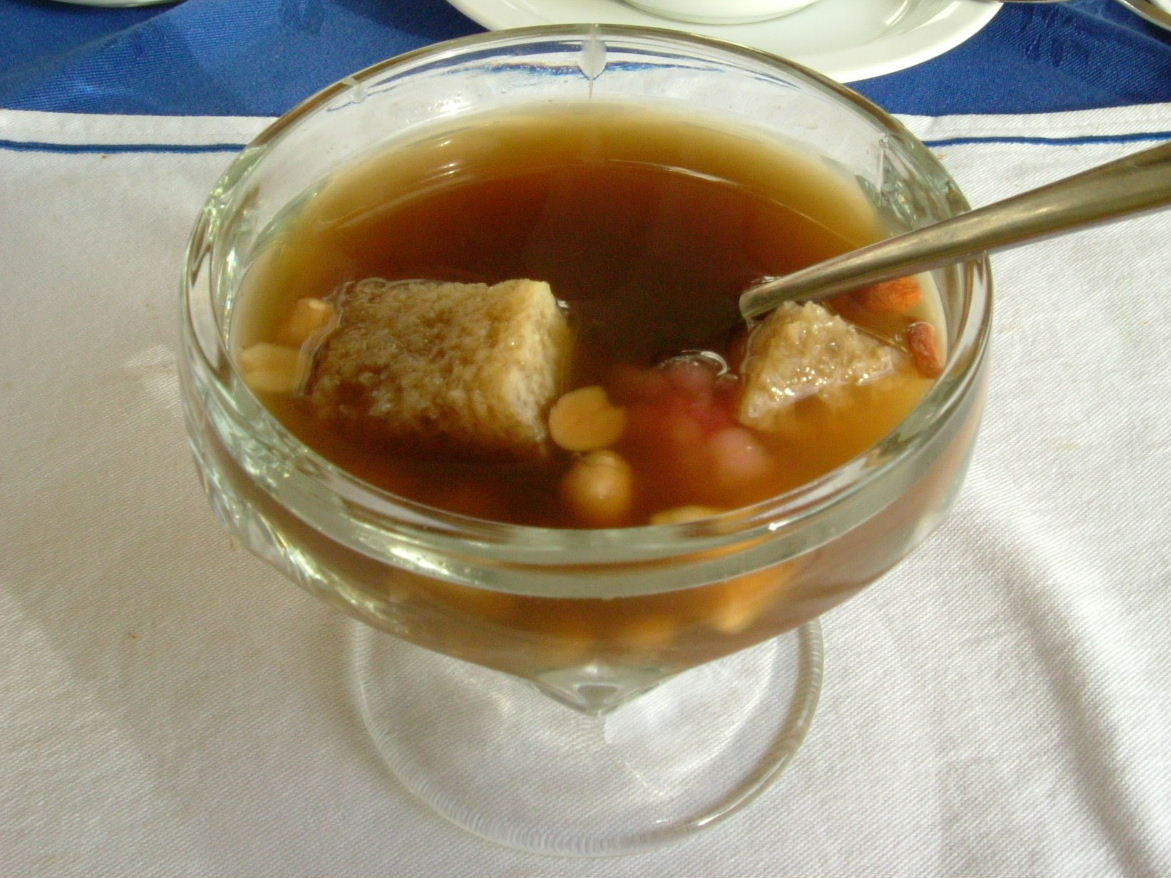
Sekoteng

Sekoteng, a ginger-based hot drink which includes peanuts, diced bread, and tapioca pearls (known locally as pacar cina), can be found in Jakarta, West Java, and Central Java.

== See also ==
- Bajigur
- List of Indonesian beverages
