= Bandrek =

Indonesian hot and sweet beverage

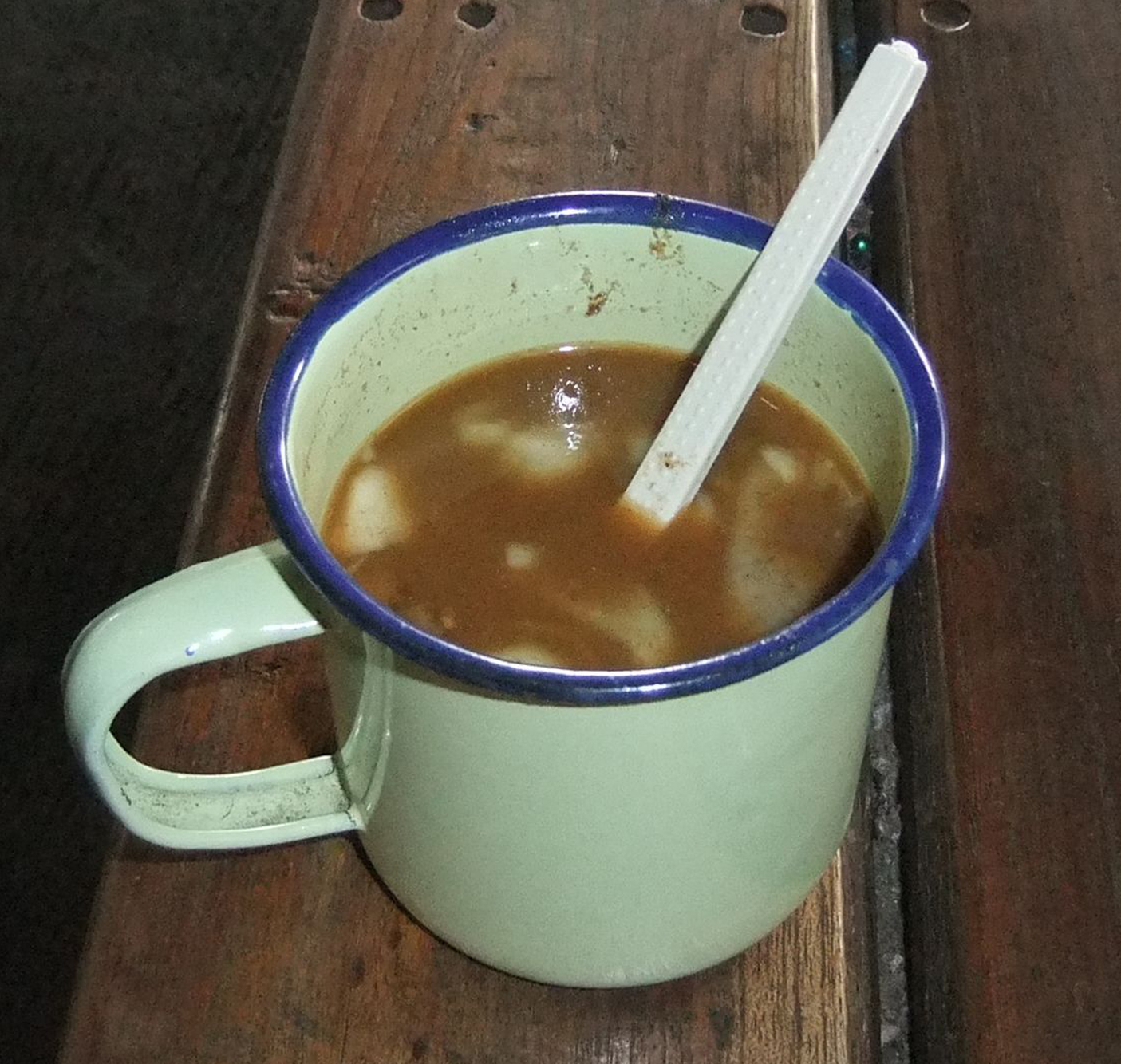
- Bandrek in Bandung with bits of young coconut
- Course: Beverage
- Place of origin: Indonesia
- Region or state: West Java
- Serving temperature: Hot
- Main ingredients: Ginger, palm sugar, cinnamon, spices, condensed milk

Bandrek is a traditional hot, sweet and spicy beverage native to Sundanese of West Java, Indonesia. The Sundanese people who live in the cool highlands consume bandrek to warm themselves at night and during cold weather.

This hot beverage is made of a mixture of ginger water, palm sugar and cinnamon. Other ingredients such as star anise, cloves, coriander seeds, cardamom pods, lemongrass, and a small amount of black pepper are sometimes added. Milk can also be added to the mix, depending on one's taste. Sweetened condensed milk or coconut milk is commonly used for this purpose.

It is believed that bandrek has a healing effect on minor health problems, such as sore throat.

== Variations ==
Sometimes pieces of young coconut flesh are added as well. The latest variant includes pieces of durian placed into the bandrek.

== See also ==
- Bajigur
- Masala chai
- Sbiten
- List of hot beverages
- List of Indonesian beverages
- Wedang Jahe
