= Es doger =

Indonesian iced sweet dessert

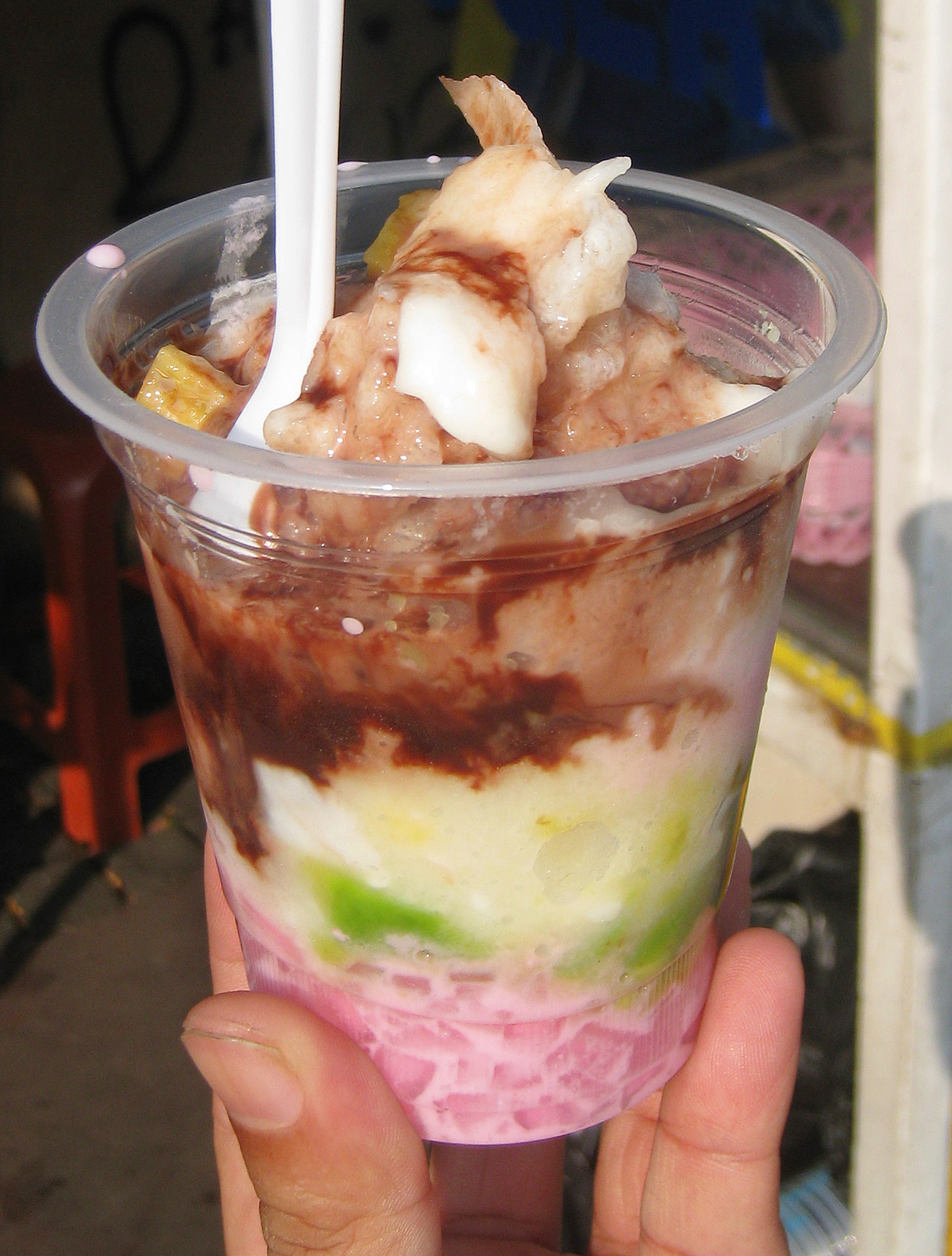
- A cup of es doger
- Course: Dessert
- Place of origin: Indonesia
- Region or state: Bandung, West Java
- Serving temperature: Cold
- Main ingredients: Coconut milk and ice in pink syrup with red tapioca pearls, avocado, cassava tapai, black glutinous rice tapai, jackfruit, and condensed milk

Es doger is an Indonesian coconut milk-based shaved ice beverage with pinkish color often served as a dessert. It is a specialty of Bandung, West Java. The main, or base, part is sugared sweet coconut milk-based ice in pink syrup, served with pacar cina merah delima (red tapioca pearls), avocado, cassava tapai, ketan hitam (black glutinous rice) tapai, jackfruit, diced bread and condensed milk. The condensed milk can be plain (white) or chocolate-flavoured. Es doger gains its pinkish color from rozen (rose) syrup, cocopandan syrup, or pink food coloring. Es doger is commonly sold by travelling vendor carts in major Indonesian cities, mainly in Bandung, Jakarta, Malang and Surabaya.

== See also ==
- Ais kacang
- Cendol
- Es campur
- Es teler
- Halo-halo
- Kakigōri
