= Kopi tubruk =

Indonesian coffee drink

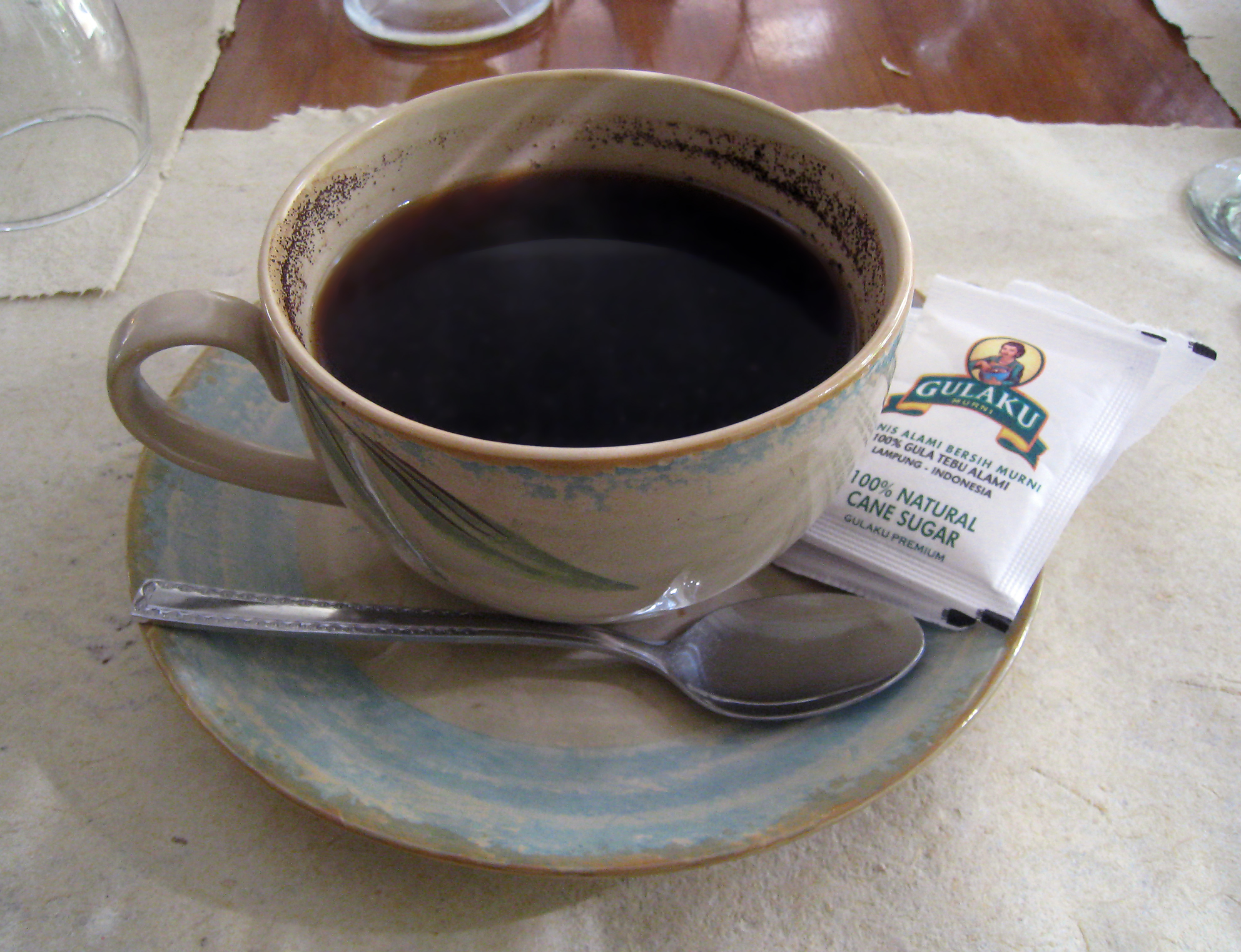

Kopi Tubruk is an Indonesian-style coffee where hot water is poured over fine coffee grounds directly in the glass, without any filtration, usually with added sugar.

In Bali, Kopi Tubruk is known by the name "Kopi Selem" which means black coffee.

== Etymology ==
The first word of kopi tubruk's name is derived from the Indonesian word for coffee, kopi. While tubruk is a Javanese word meaning collision. The name refers to both the name of the beverage and the style of preparation.

== History ==
Kopi tubruk is thought to have been brought to Indonesia by merchants from the Middle East. The drink is popular in Yogyakarta and Central Java and can be found in most warungs that serve coffee.

== Preparation ==
Kopi tubruk uses finely ground coffee beans. Sometimes, instant coffee is used, albeit one that contains no sugar or milk. These ground coffee beans are then mixed with boiled water. Kopi tubruk is usually served in a clear glass. Since the coffee is brewed without any filter, the used coffee grounds will coagulate at the bottom of the glass. Sugar can also be added, and some modern variants also add condensed milk.

== See also ==
- Kopi luwak
- List of Indonesian drinks
- List of coffee drinks
