= Masala chai =

Flavoured Indian tea

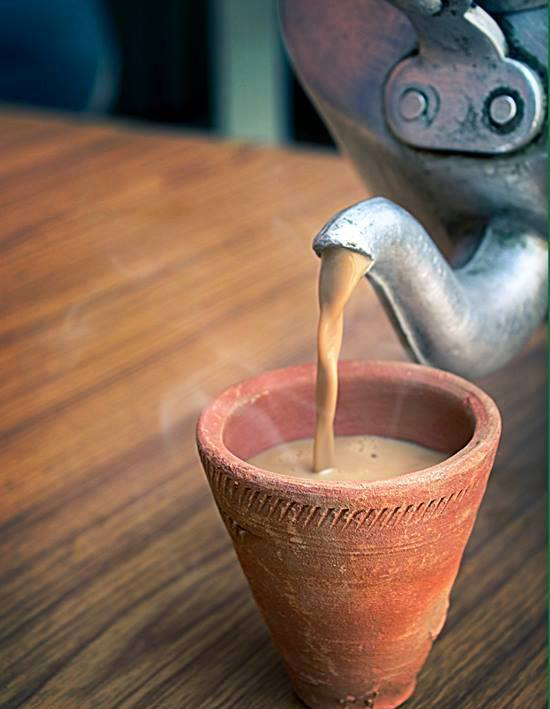
- Freshly steeped masala chai being poured in a kulhar
- Alternative names: Spiced tea
- Type: Flavoured tea
- Course: Drink
- Place of origin: India, Pakistan, Bangladesh
- Associated cuisine: Indian, Pakistani, Bangladeshi,
- Serving temperature: Hot
- Main ingredients: Black tea, milk, spices, sugar

Masala chai (/məˈsɑːlə tʃaɪ/; lit. 'mixed-spice tea') also known as chai latte is a popular beverage originating from India. It is made by adding aromatic herbs and spices to chai, which is itself made from brewing black tea (usually crush, tear, curl) in milk and water, and sweetening with sugar (often using aeration techniques only performed by masters or "tevanas").

== Etymology ==
The term chai originated from the Chinese word for tea, cha via the Hindustani chai (चाय). In English, this spiced tea is commonly referred to as chai tea, or simply chai. Originating in India, the beverage has gained worldwide popularity, becoming a feature in many coffee and teahouses, with many using the term chai latte or chai tea latte for their version to indicate that it is made with steamed milk, much like that used to make a latte but mixed with a spiced tea concentrate instead of espresso.

== History ==
The word for tea in most Indian languages is "chai" derived from the Chinese word cha. Tea however became a popular beverage introduced to India by the British. Tea plants have grown wild in the Assam region since antiquity, but historically, Indians viewed tea as an herbal medicine rather than as a recreational beverage.

In the 1830s, the British East India Company became concerned about the Chinese monopoly on tea, which constituted most of their trade and supported the enormous consumption of tea in Great Britain of around 1 pound (0.45 kg) per person per year. British colonists had recently noticed the existence of the Assamese tea plants and began to cultivate tea plantations locally. In 1870, over 90% of the tea consumed in Great Britain was still of Chinese origin, but by 1900, this had dropped to 10%, largely replaced by tea grown in India (50%) and Ceylon (33%).

However, consumption of black tea within India remained low until the promotional campaign by the Indian Tea Association in the early 20th century, which encouraged factories, mines and textile mills to provide tea breaks for their workers. It also supported many independent chaiwalas throughout the growing railway system.

Tea was promoted as served Indian style, with small added amounts of milk and sugar. The Indian Tea Association initially disapproved of independent vendors' tendency to add spices and greatly increase the proportions of milk and sugar, thus reducing their usage (and thus purchase) of tea leaves per liquid volume. However, chai later firmly established itself as a popular beverage.

== Preparation and ingredients ==
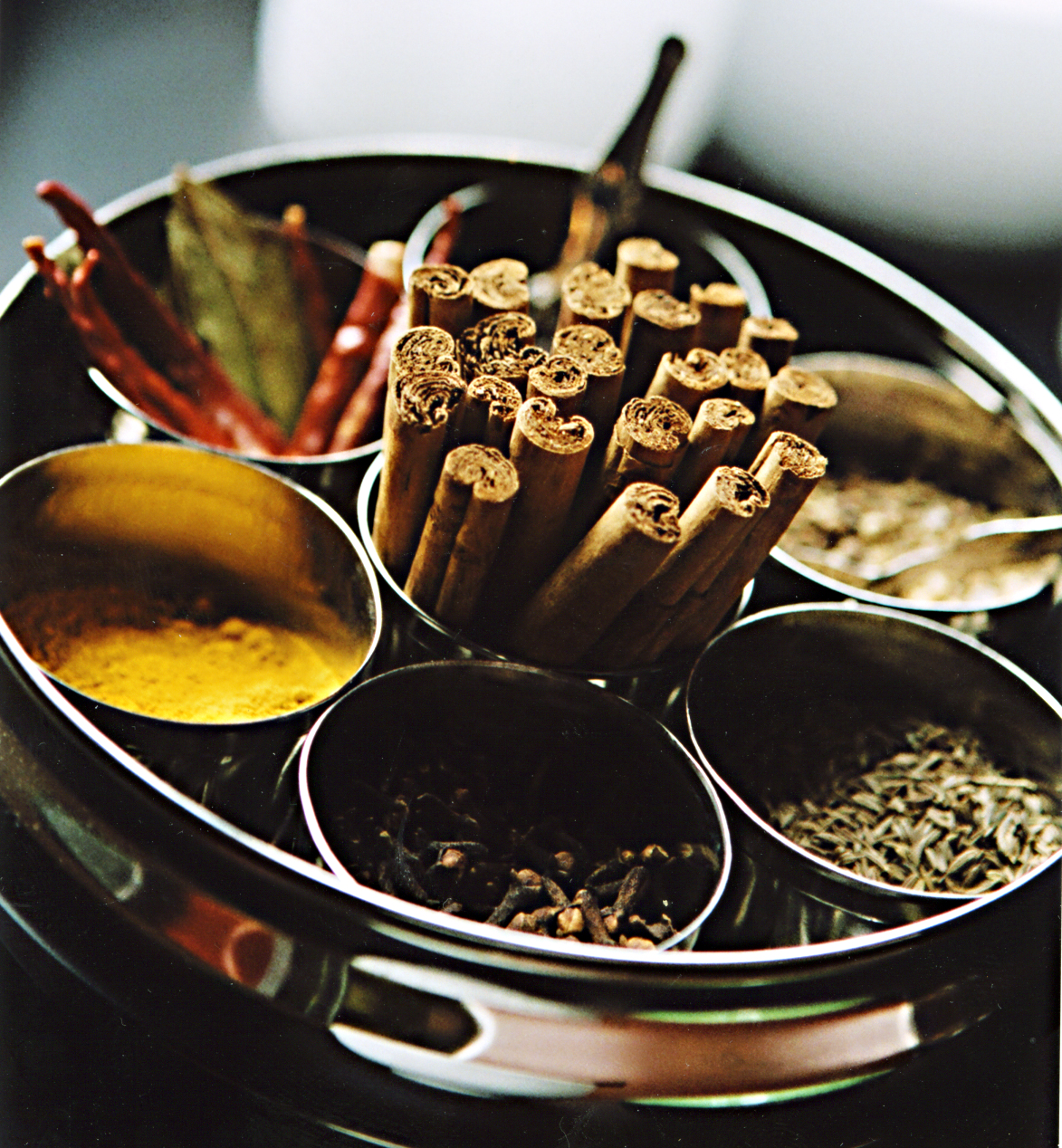
Typical spices used for masala chai

=== Preparation ===
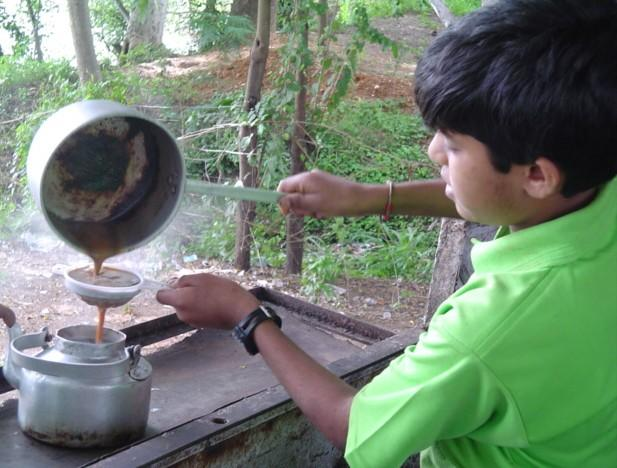
A boy in Mysore preparing masala chai: As it is prepared by decoction, preparation usually includes straining tea from the solids.

Masala chai is composed of three major components: masala, chai (or tea), and milk. Recipes and methods of preparation for chai can vary by geography and family.

One way to prepare masala chai is to simmer spices in a pot of water. Tea is then added to the pot and brewed to preference. After brewing, the tea and spice mixture is strained, and milk or cream is added.

A common Maharashtrian method for preparing one cup of chai is to first combine one-half cup of water with one-half cup of milk in a pot over heat. Sugar may be added at this point or after. Ginger is then grated into the mixture, followed by the addition of tea masala, typically consisting of crushed ginger, crushed cardamom, lemongrass, cloves, and cinnamon. The mixture is brought to a boil, and one teaspoon of loose black tea is added.

=== Tea ===
Black tea is typically used as a base in most chai recipes. The most common type of black tea is from Assam; however, a blend of different tea variations may be used. Assam, Darjeeling, and Nilgiri are the three most common types of tea used in chai in India.

=== Spices ===
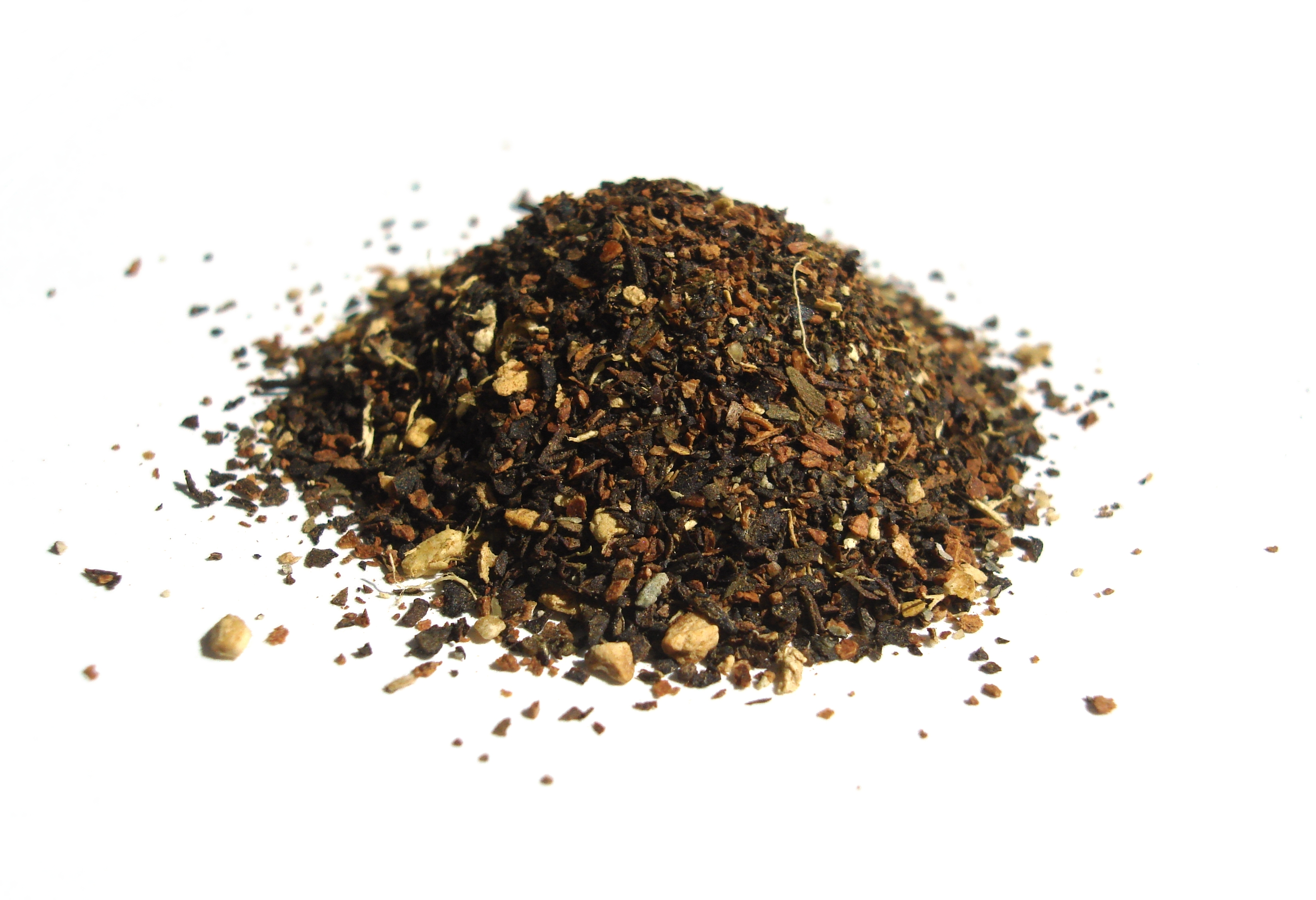
Spices and cut tea leaves

The spices used in masala chai most often include cardamom, grated ginger, and cinnamon. Also used are cloves, star anise, black peppercorns, mint, lemongrass, and more.

Masala chai in western India often excludes cloves and black peppercorns. A small amount of salt is often added to chai in the region of Bhopal. The Kashmiri version of chai is brewed with green tea instead of black tea and has a more subtle blend of spices with a pinch of salt. This version is a bit savoury and is pink in colour, due to the addition of baking soda.

=== Milk ===
Traditionally in India, milk from water buffaloes is used to make chai. Although whole milk is usually used in masala chai, some people prefer alternatives such as soy milk or skimmed milk.

=== Sweetener ===
White sugar, brown sugar, demerara sugar, honey, and jaggery are all used as sweeteners in chai.

== Consumption ==
=== Consumption in the Indian subcontinent ===
Small vendors (called chaiwalla in Hindustani (Hindi-Urdu), etc.; cha-wala in Odia, Bengali, Punjabi, etc.) are found by the side of every highway, road and alley – often the only establishments that will be open through the night. They generally also sell tobacco and snacks. Many will deliver tea to people's places of business in a chaidaan, a wooden or metal frame carrier for cups. Chai is sometimes served in a kulhar.

In Mumbai, roadside tea stalls serve small, inexpensive cups of tea called 'cutting chai'. They're so called for being a full-size, full-price cup of tea "cut" in half.

In Pakistan, masala chai is usually brewed with milk and sweetened with spices like cardamom, cinnamon and/or cloves.

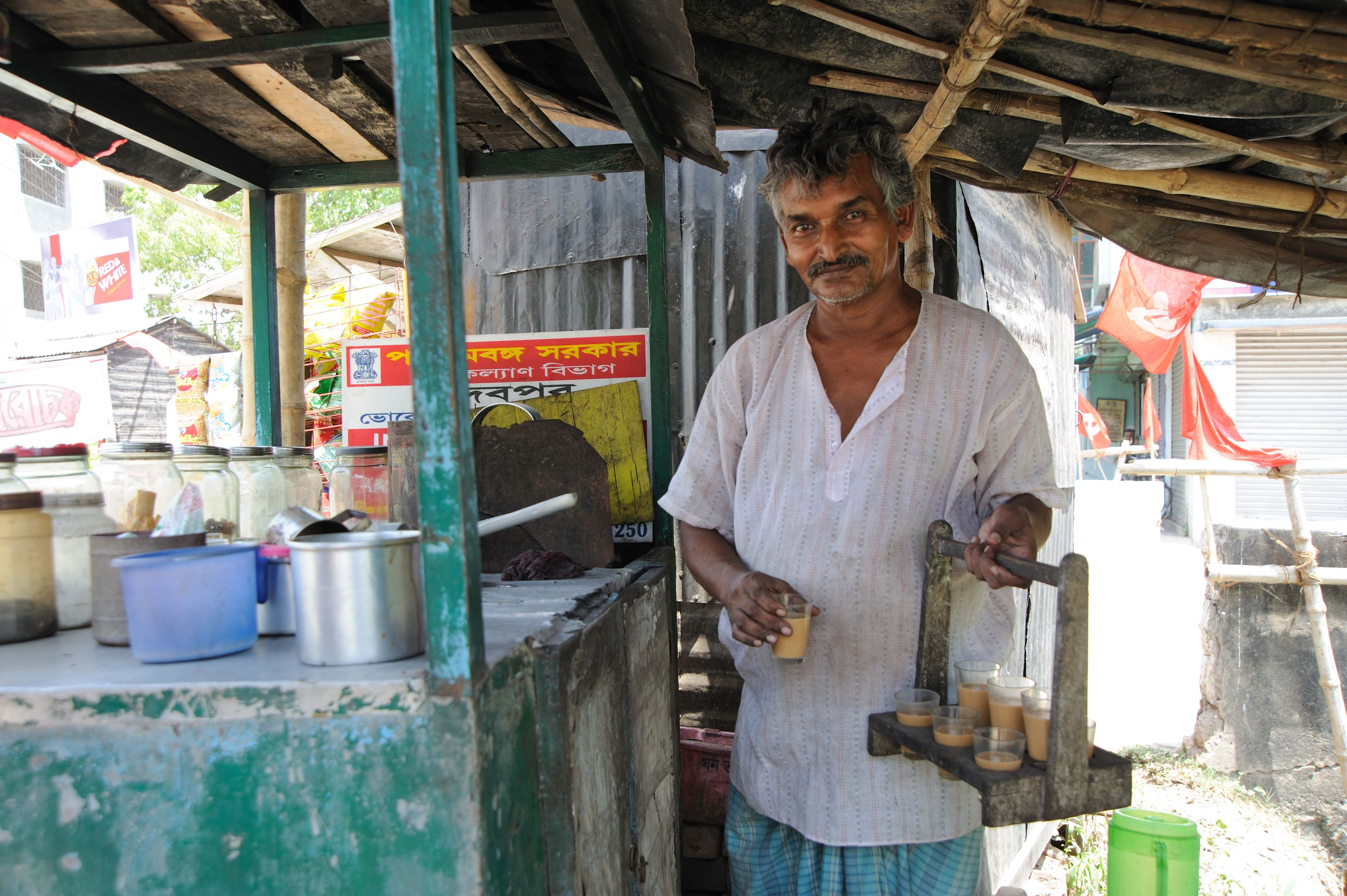
A man in Kolkata, with a chaidaan for carrying nine glasses of chai – plain tea without masala

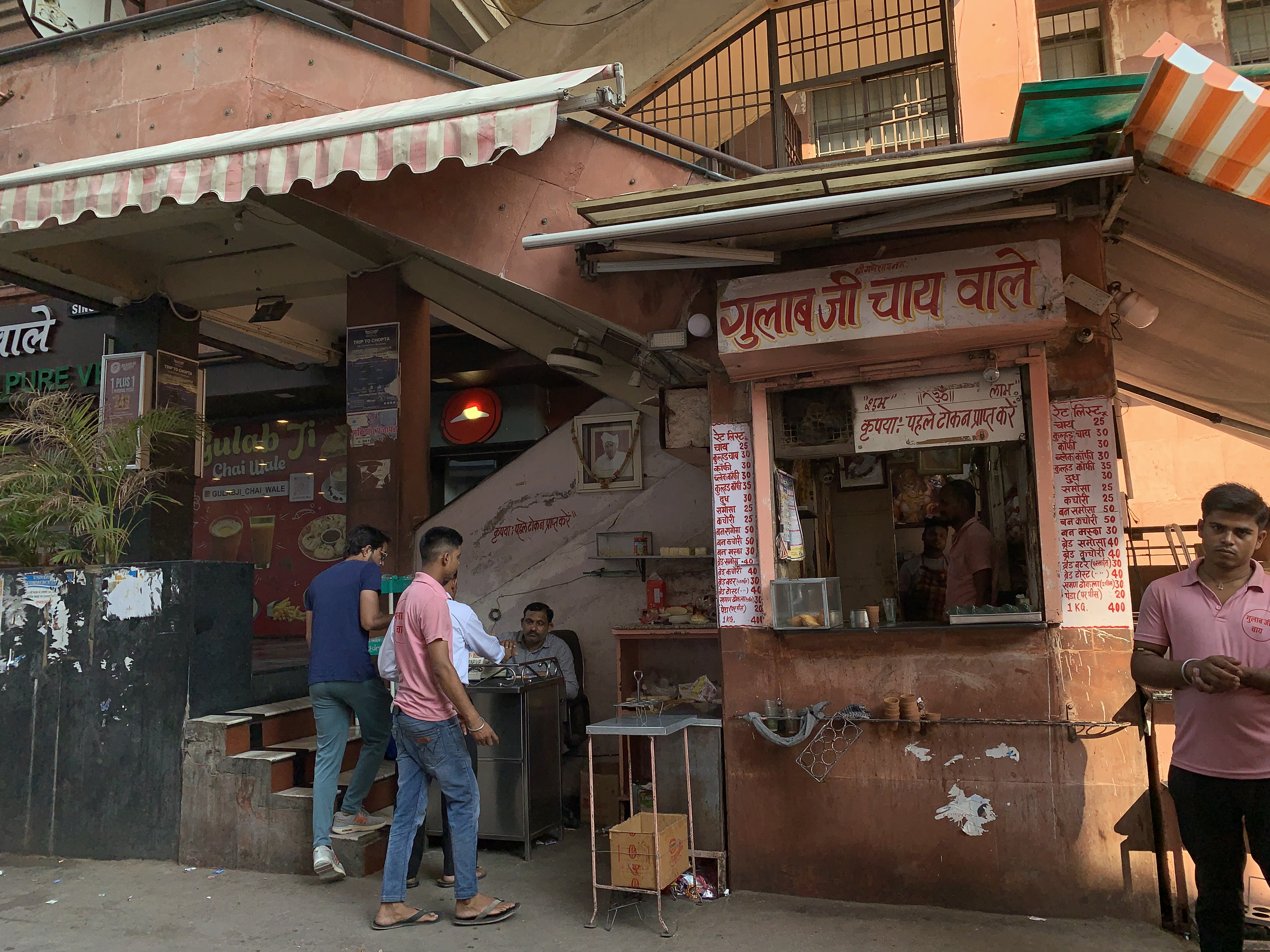
A roadside chaiwala (chai store) in Jaipur, Rajasthan, India

=== Consumption beyond the Indian subcontinent ===
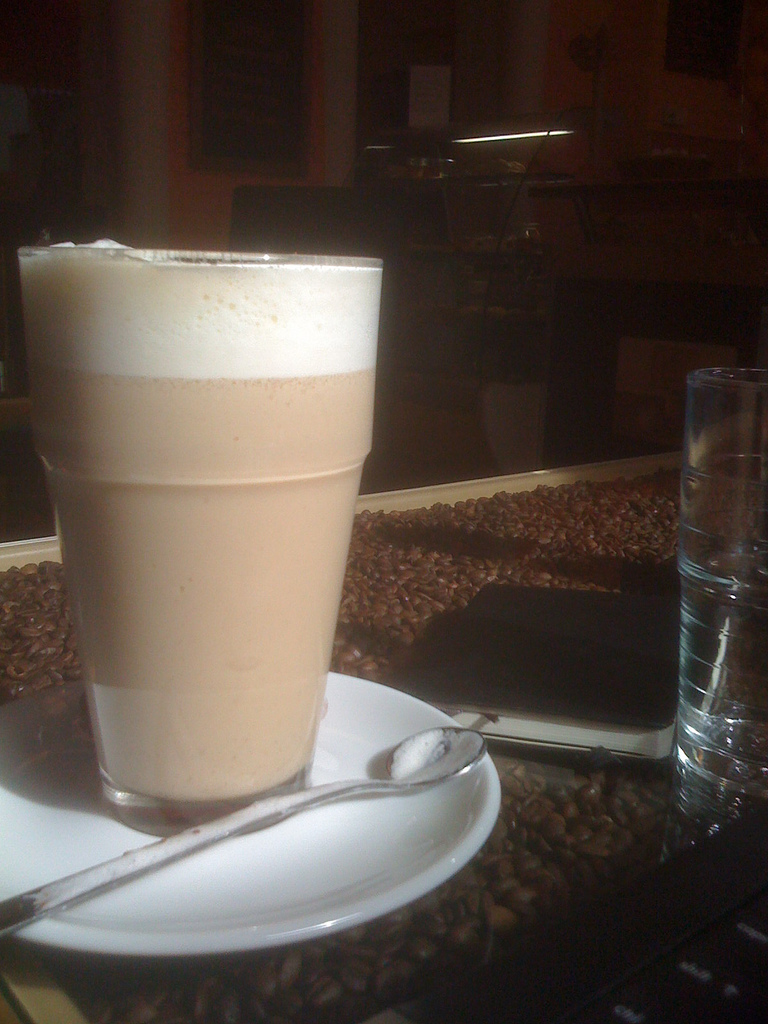
A soy vanilla chai latte served in Berlin, Germany

Masala chai is popular in East Africa and the Caribbean. It is also popular in the Gulf Arab region, where it is known as Chai Karak (Arabic: شاي كرك, Urdu: کڑک چائے). The drink was popularized by South Asian expatriate communities in the region.

==== In the West ====
Since Starbucks introduced its chai tea latte in 1998, chai beverages have become popular at coffee shops across the United States, often made from a syrup or concentrate. Chai with added espresso is commonly called a dirty chai.

== See also ==
- Indian cuisine
- History of tea in India
- Indian tea culture
- Pakistani tea culture
- Chaiwala
- Kulhar
- Darjeeling tea
- Ginger tea
- Noon chai
- Bandrek
- List of Indian drinks
