= Moke (drink) =

Traditional beverage from Flores Island, Indonesia

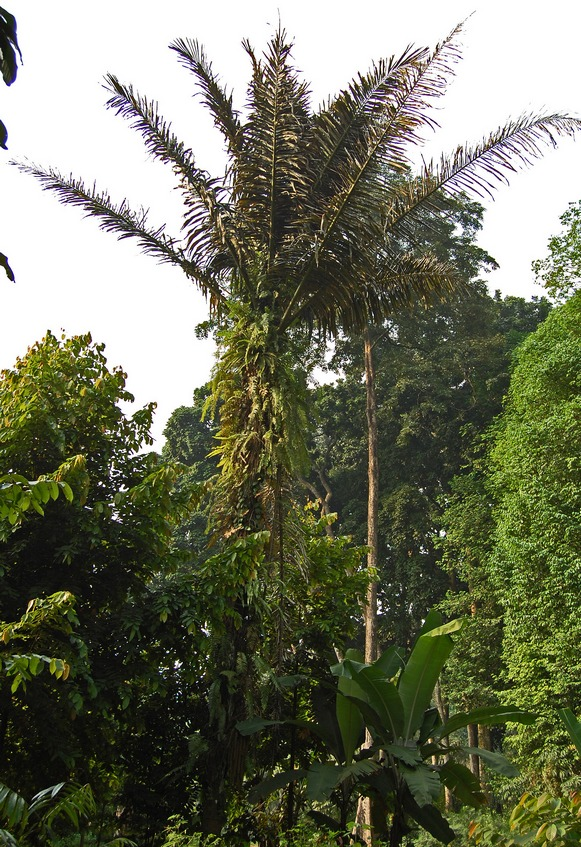
Fruit from Arenga pinnata as an ingredient for moke

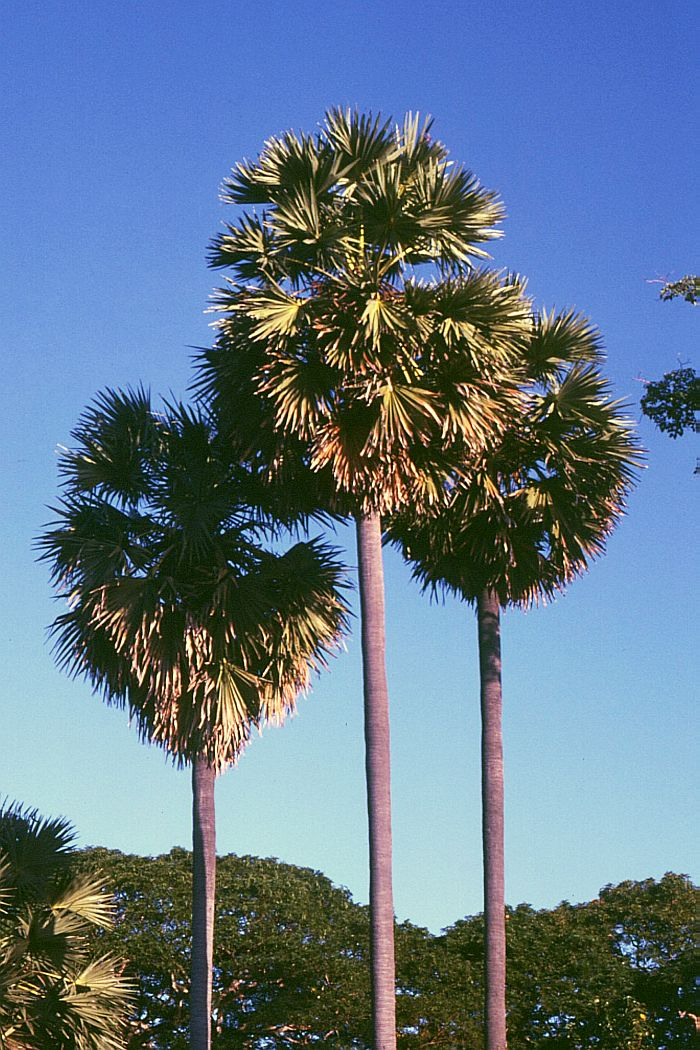
Fruit from Borassus flabellifer as an ingredient for moke

Moke is a traditional drink from Flores Island, Indonesia, which is made from fruits of the Borassus flabellifer and Arenga pinnata palm trees. This beverage has many names, including sopi and dewe, but it is most widely known as moke on Flores Island. Moke is considered to be a symbol of friendship and hospitality for the local people.

== Moke in Flores Island ==
Moke is made from fermenting palmyra palm and sugar palm fruits, the technique of which is traditionally taught from generation to generation. Distillation is often done directly in people's yards, using customary cases made of clay for the fermentation process. One bottle of moke takes approximately 5 hours to collect. This is due to the need to wait, drop by drop, for the fruits' liquid to accumulate slowly through the use of a bamboo tool.

The best quality moke is considered by Florenese locals as bakar menyala, or 'hot and flaming'. This variety, unlike regular moke which has an alcoholic effect, is popularly regarded as good for the drinker's health.

== Varieties of Moke ==
=== White Moke ===
All varieties of moke are made by juicing B. flabellifer and A. pinnata palm fruits. The traditional method involves a hollow bamboo stick, which is cut, washed, and then allowed to dry. Next, the prepared fruit is placed inside the bamboo, which is then hung up vertically and struck several times. After this step, the bottom tip of the bamboo stem is cut off, letting the palm fruits' released liquid drip down into a container below.

This sweet-tasting extract is called white moke, due to the whitish color of the fresh juice. It may then be further processed either by fermentation in jars, or by cooking it down into a reddish sugar.

=== Black Moke ===
Black moke is an alcoholic beverage made by fermenting white moke in earthenware clay vessels called kuwu tua. Black moke is often served in traditional parties and ceremonies.

== See also ==
- List of Indonesian drinks
