= Ginger tea =

Tea beverage made from ginger root

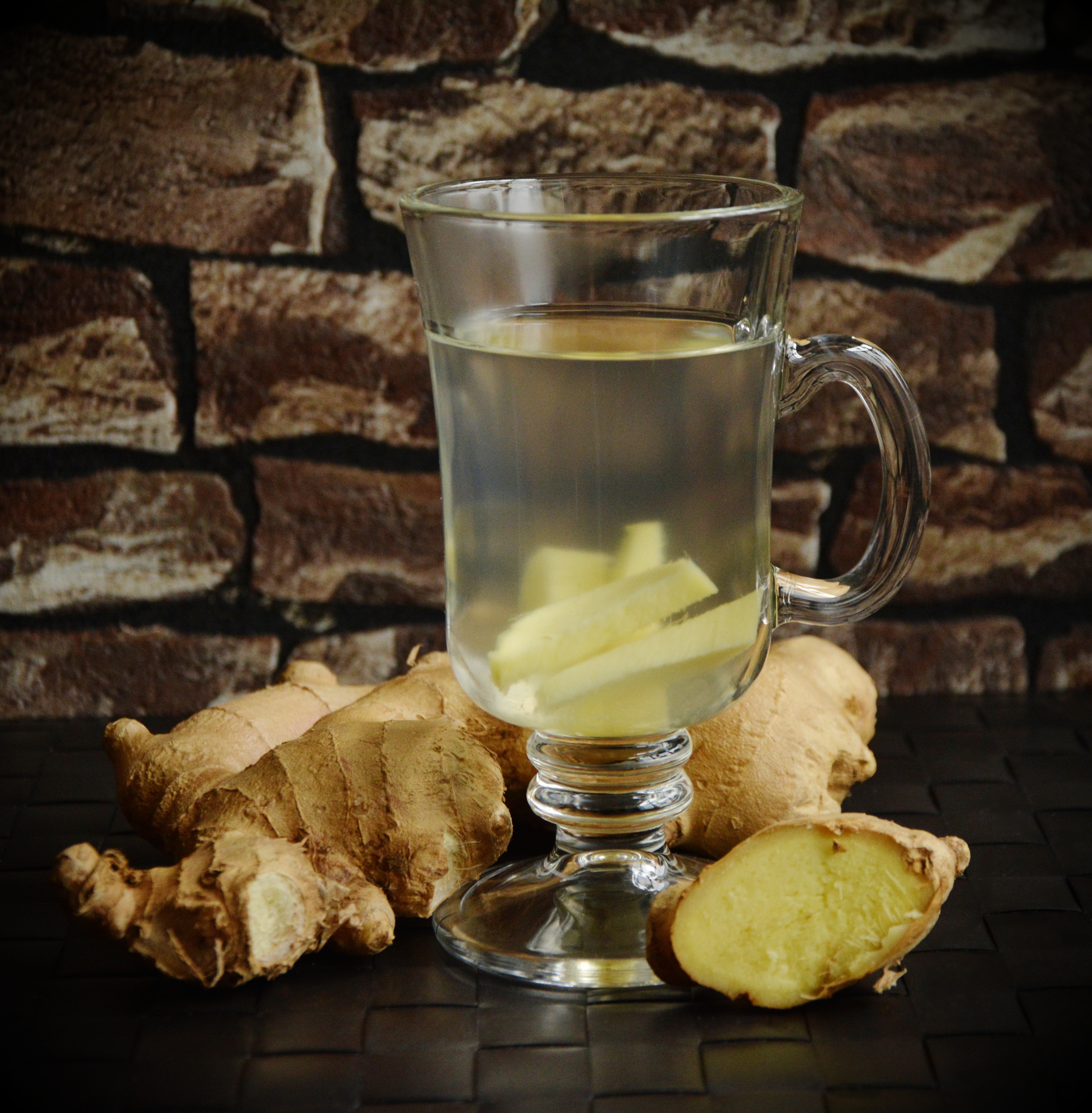
- Type: Herbal tea
- Other names: Saenggang-cha; salabat; shōga-yu; teh halia; teh jahe
- Origin: Asia
- Quick description: Tea made from ginger
- Temperature: 100 °C (212 °F)
- Time: Varies

Regional names

Chinese name
- Traditional Chinese: 薑母茶
- Simplified Chinese: 姜母茶
- Literal meaning: ginger mother (mature ginger) tea
Transcriptions
Standard Mandarin
- Hanyu Pinyin: jiāngmǔ chá
Yue: Cantonese
- Yale Romanization: gēungmóuh chàh
- Jyutping: goeng1mou5 caa4

Korean name
- Hangul: 생강차
- Hanja: 生薑茶
- Literal meaning: ginger tea
Transcriptions
- Revised Romanization: saenggangcha
- McCune–Reischauer: saenggangch'a

Japanese name
- Kanji: 生姜湯
- Kana: しょうがゆ
Transcriptions
- Revised Hepburn: shōga-yu

Malay name
- Malay: teh halia

Indonesian name
- Indonesian: teh jahe

Filipino name
- Tagalog: salabat

Ginger tea is a herbal beverage that is made from ginger root. It has a long history as a traditional herbal medicine in East Asia, South Asia, Southeast Asia, and West Asia.

== Regional variations and customs ==
Ginger tea can be drunk by itself, or served alongside traditional accompaniments, such as milk, orange slices, or lemon.

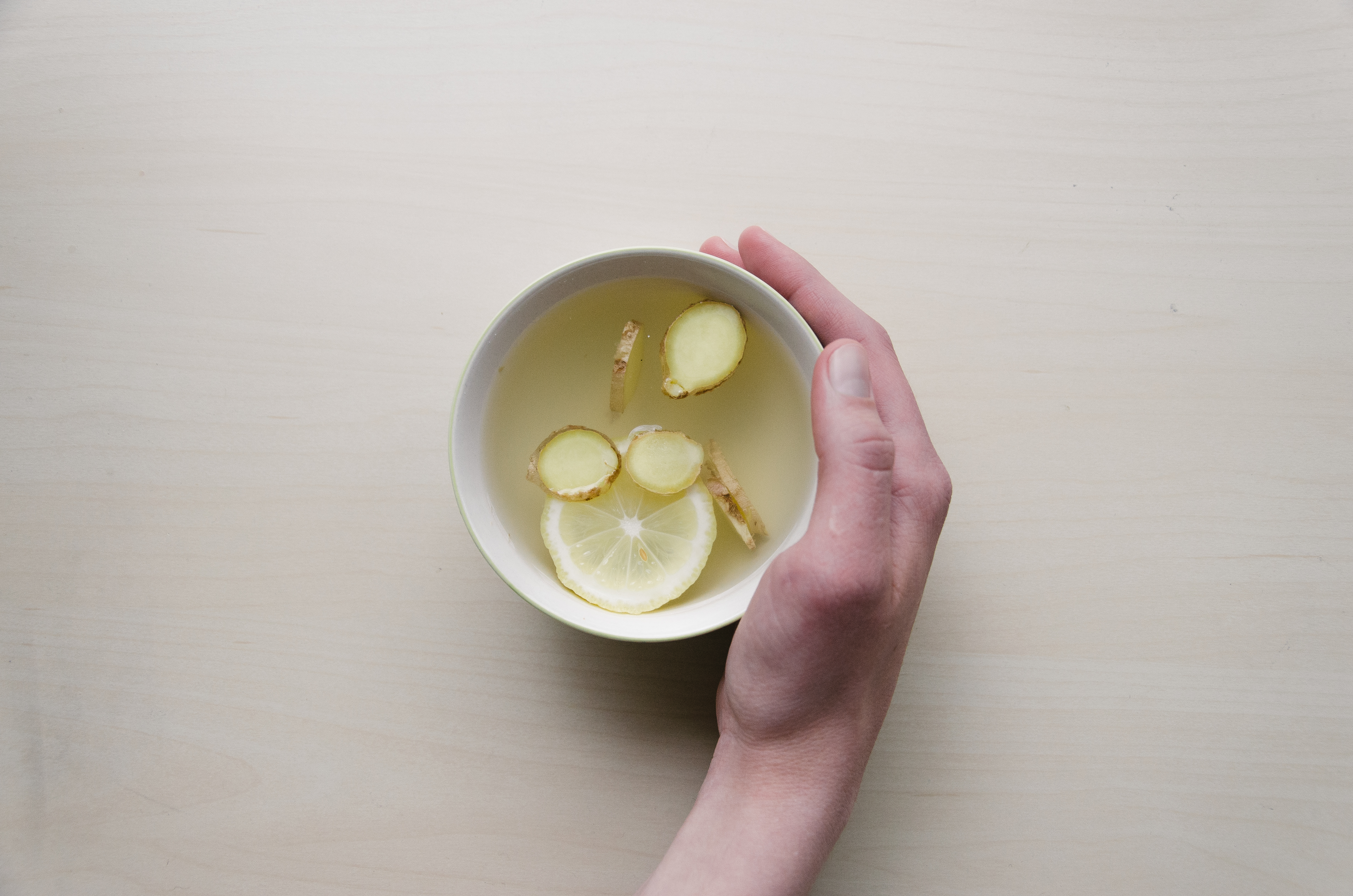
Lemon ginger tea

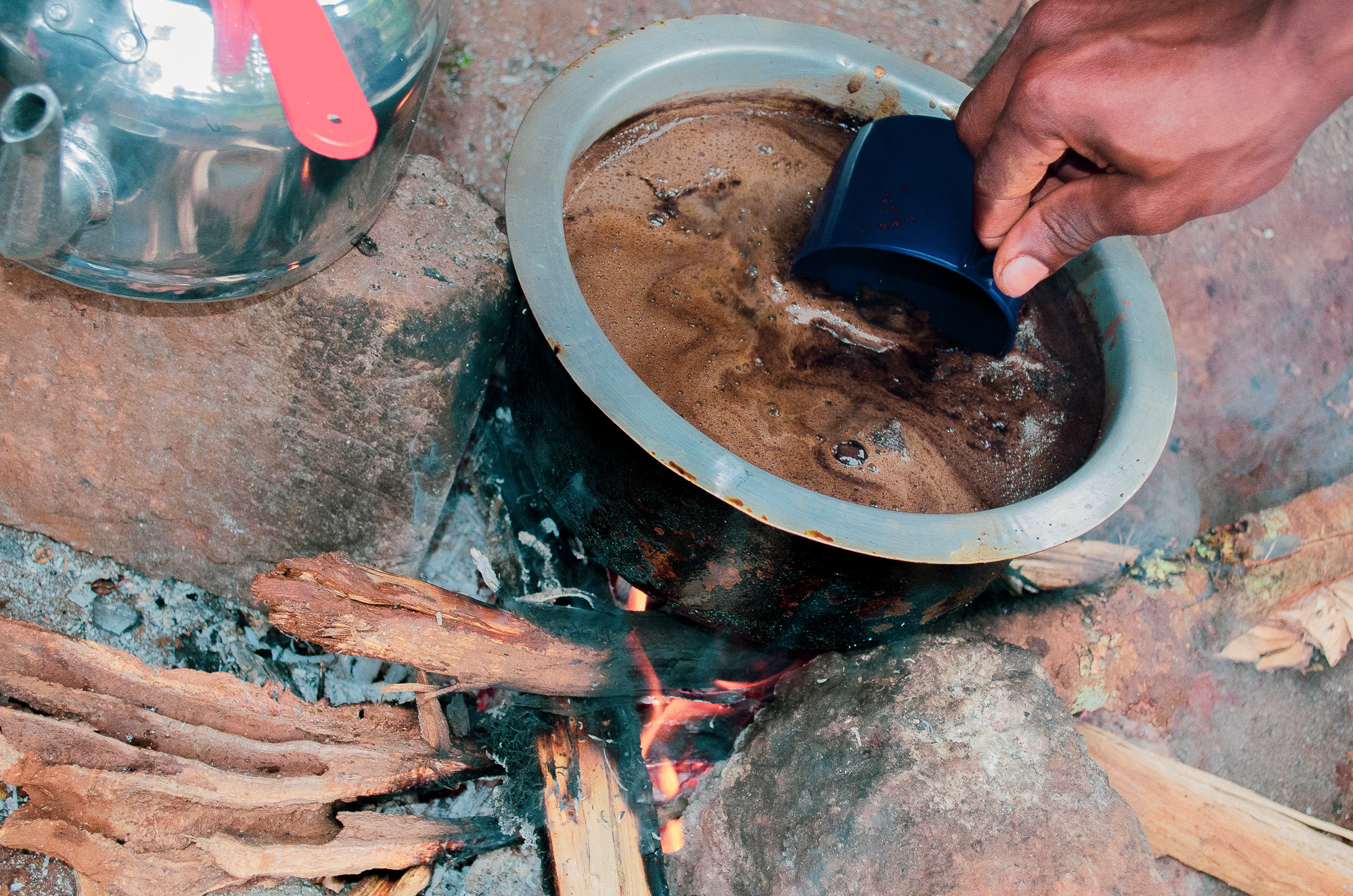
Boiled lemon and ginger tea in Tanzania

=== North America ===
==== United States of America ====
The concept of tea was introduced to the U.S. by the Dutch in the mid-1640s. It was known as the First Amsterdam drink and has evolved into various flavors. Since China had invented the idea of tea, the U.S. only began learning of their methods when the Dutch brought it over during trade.

=== East Asia ===
==== China ====
In the Tang dynasty, tea was flavored to counteract the bitter taste. Ginger was favored among tea drinkers, in addition to onion, orange peel, cloves, and peppermint.

==== Japan ====
In Japan, it is called Shōgayu (生姜湯).

==== Korea ====
In Korea, ginger tea is called saenggang-cha (생강차; 生薑茶, [sɛ̝ŋ.ɡaŋ.tɕʰa]). It can be made either by boiling fresh ginger slices in water or mixing ginger juice with hot water. Sliced ginger preserved in honey, called saenggang-cheong, can also be mixed with hot water to make ginger tea. Nowadays, powdered instant versions are also widely available. The tea is often served with a garnish of jujubes and pine nuts. When using fresh ginger, the tea can be sweetened with honey, sugar, or other sweeteners according to taste. Garlic, jujubes, and pear are sometimes boiled along with ginger.

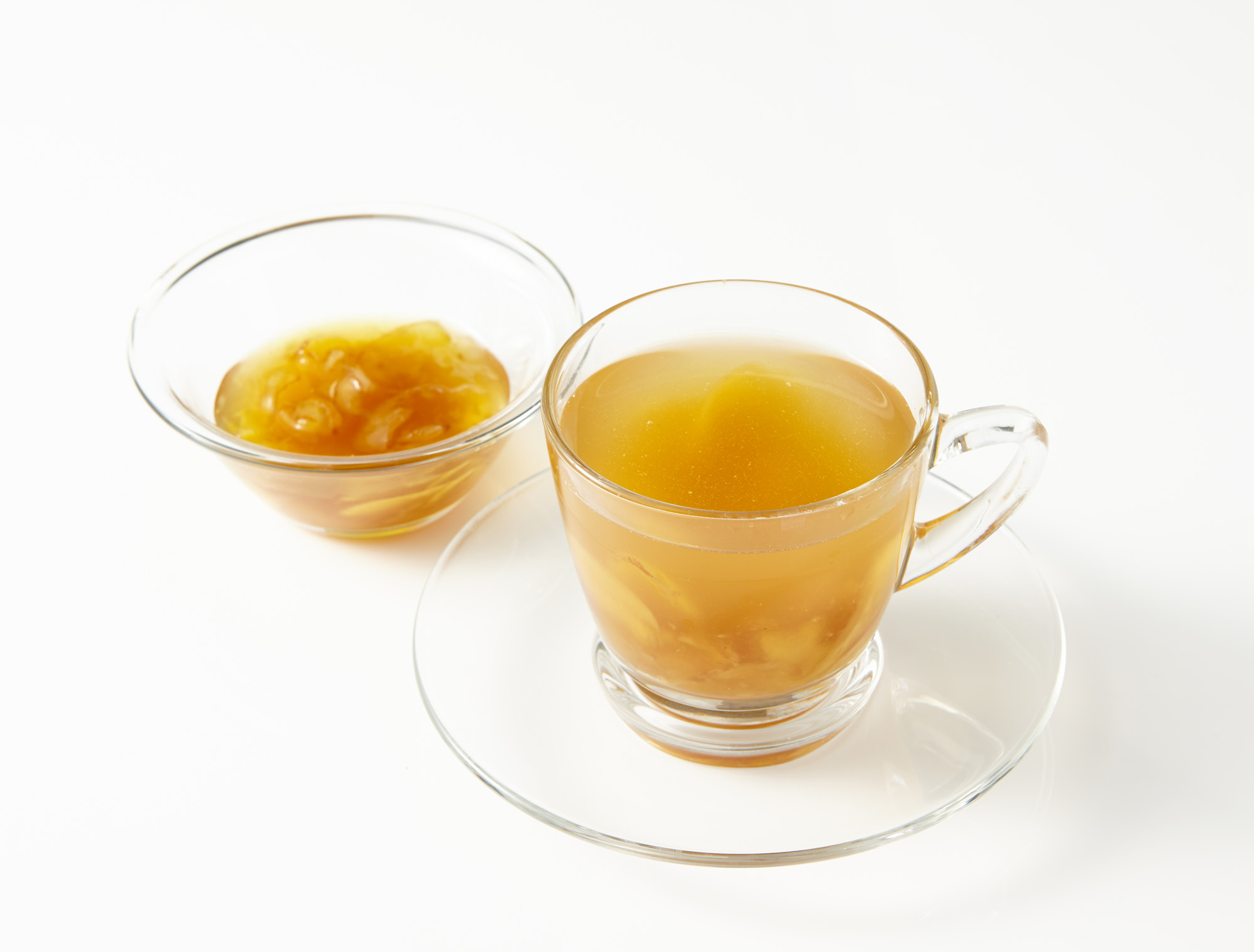
Saenggang-cha (ginger tea) made from saenggang-cheong (preserved ginger)

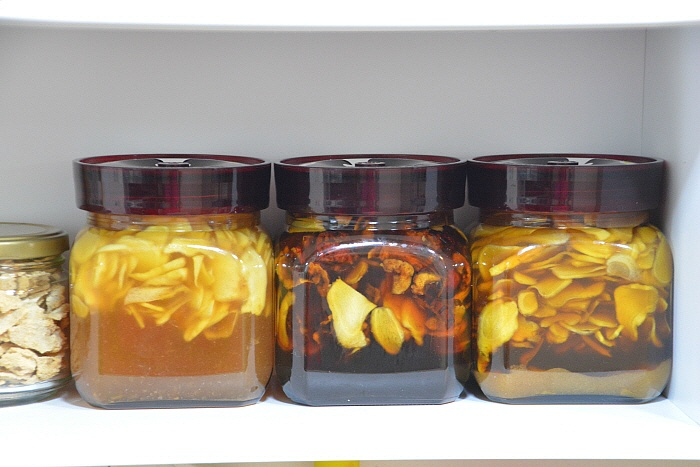
Saenggang-cheong (preserved ginger) made for saenggang-cha (ginger tea)

=== Southeast Asia ===
==== Brunei, Malaysia, Singapore ====
In Bruneian, Malaysian and Singaporean cuisines, ginger tea is generally called teh halia. It is not a pure ginger tea, as it is brewed of strong sweetened black tea, ginger rhizome, sugar with milk or condensed milk.

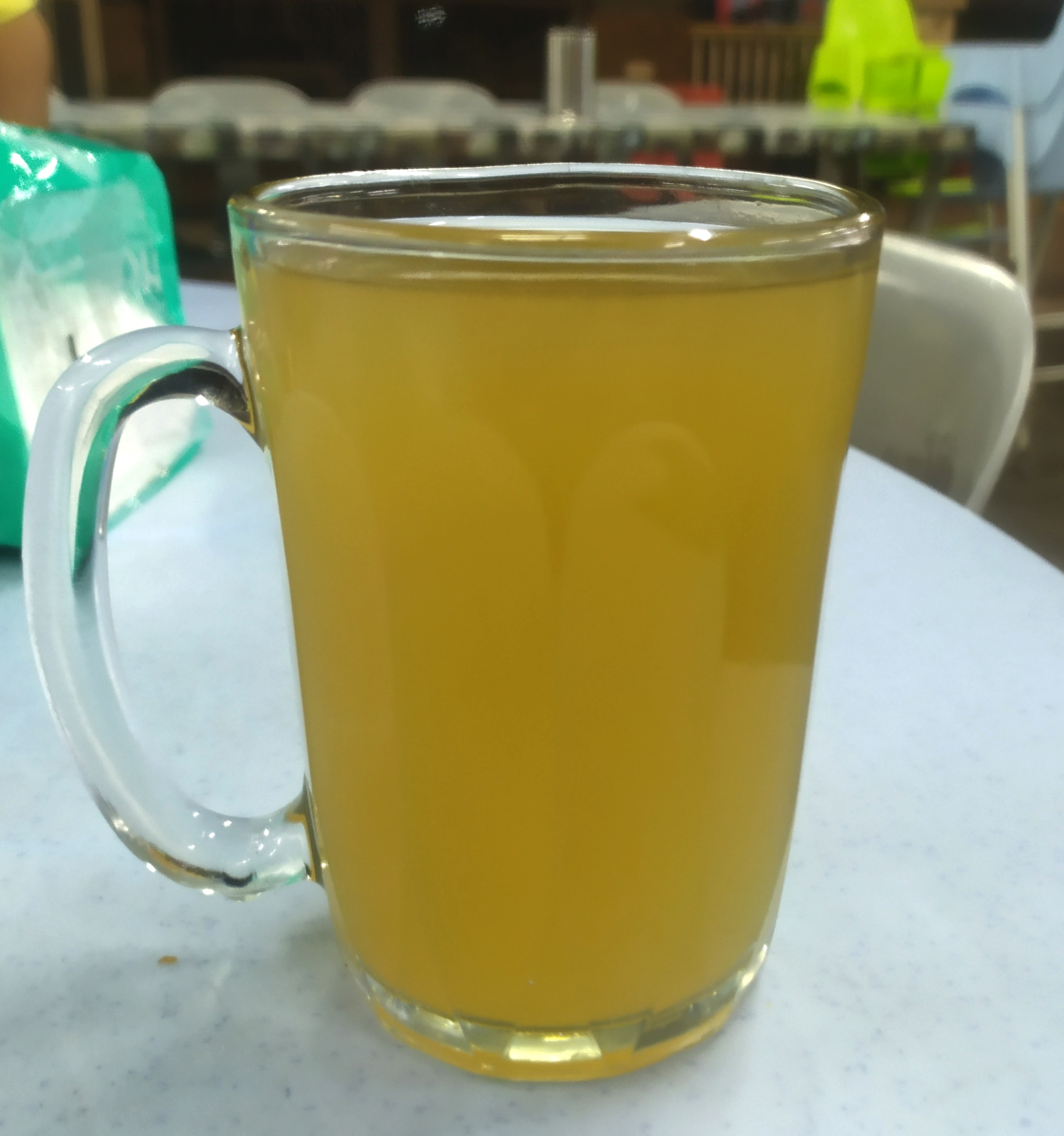
Teh serai halia (lemongrass ginger tea) in Malaysia

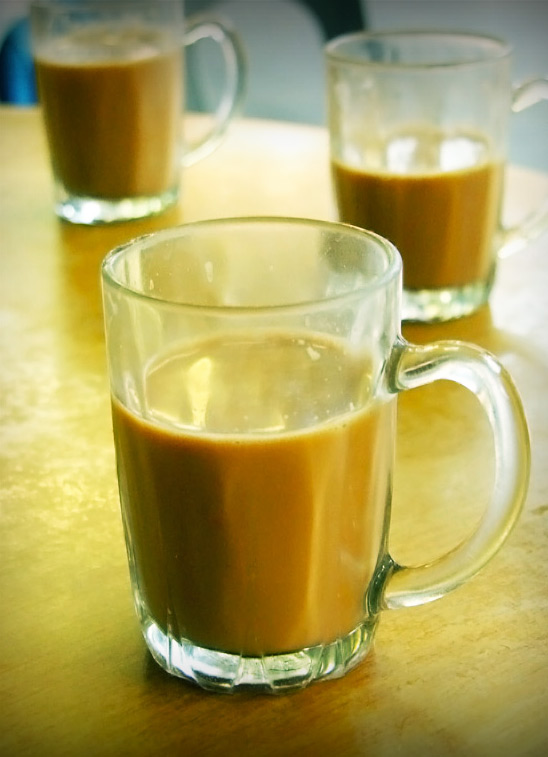
Teh halia (Singaporean ginger tea)

==== Indonesia ====
In Indonesia, it is called teh jahe. In Java, a local version of ginger tea enriched with palm sugar and spices called wedang jahe is more popular.

Wedang Jahe is a type of Indonesian ginger tea. Wedang in Javanese means "hot beverage" while jahe means "ginger". Although devoid of any caffeine content, it is often served and enjoyed as an invigorating tea. It is made from the ginger rhizome, usually fresh and cut in thin slices, and palm sugar or granulated cane sugar, frequently with the addition of fragrant pandan leaves. Palm sugar can be substituted with brown sugar or honey. People traditionally tend to add spices such as lemongrass, cloves, and cinnamon sticks.

Milk, either fresh or condensed, might be added.

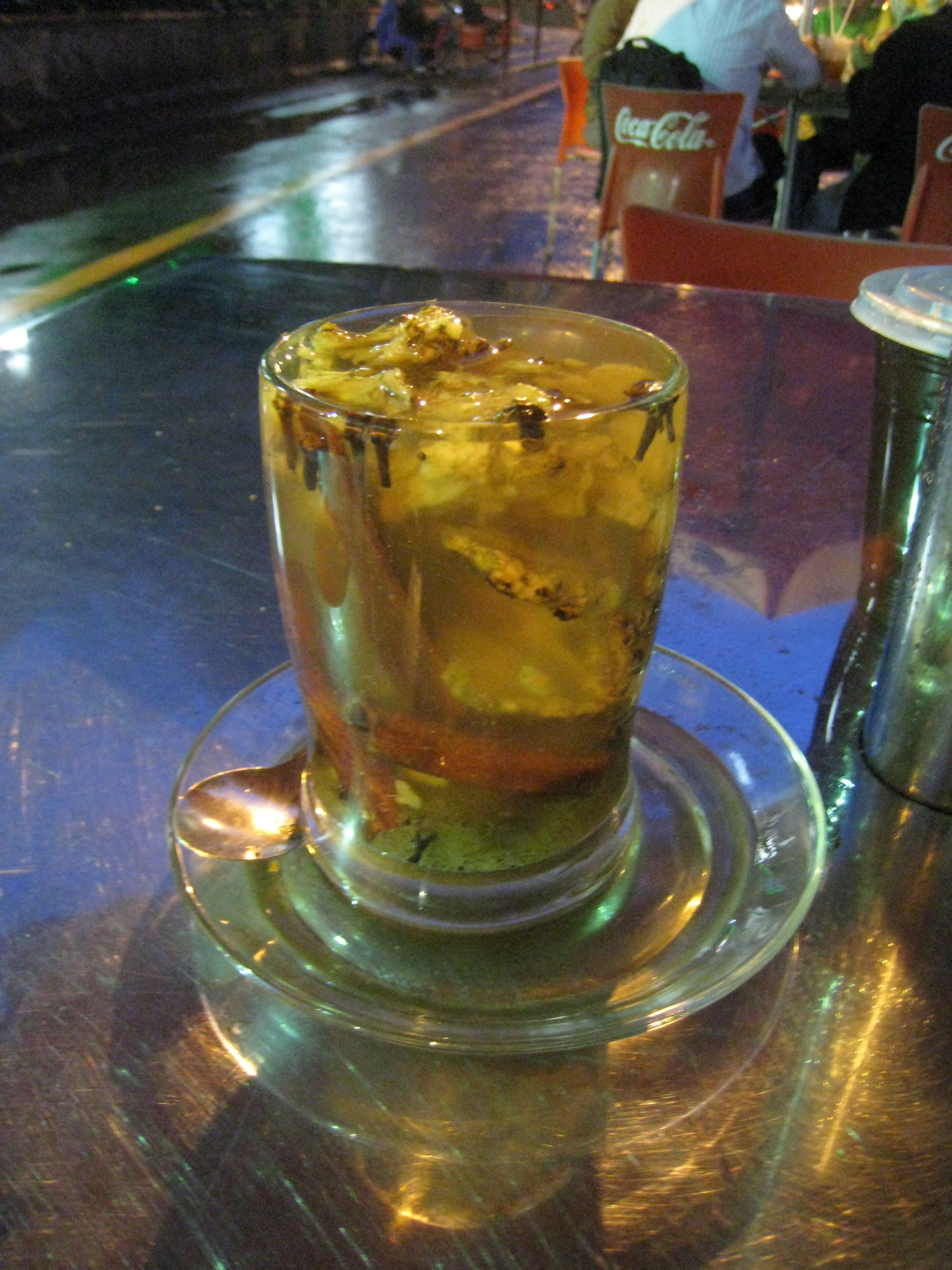
Wedang jahe (Javanese ginger tea) in Surakarta, Central Java, with bits of spices

==== Philippines ====
In the Philippines, it is called salabat and is traditionally made simply with peeled and thinly sliced or crushed raw ginger boiled for a few minutes in water. Sugar, honey, and calamansi are added for taste, along with other flavoring ingredients as desired. Modern versions can also use ground ginger powder (often called "instant salabat") added to hot boiling water. Native ginger varieties (which are small and fibrous) are preferred, as they are regarded as being more pungent than imported varieties.

Salabat is typically served in the relatively cold month of December. Along with tsokolate (traditional hot chocolate), it is usually paired with various native rice cakes (kakanin) like bibingka or puto bumbong. Salabat is traditionally sold by early morning street vendors during the Simbang Gabi (dawn mass) of the Christmas season.

Salabat is also widely consumed as a throat-soothing remedy for cough, sore throat, and common colds. Drinking salabat is believed to improve a person's singing voice.

A variant of salabat that exclusively or partially use turmeric is known as dulaw, duwaw, or duyaw in the Visayas and Mindanao islands; and tsaang dilaw (literally "yellow tea") in Filipino.

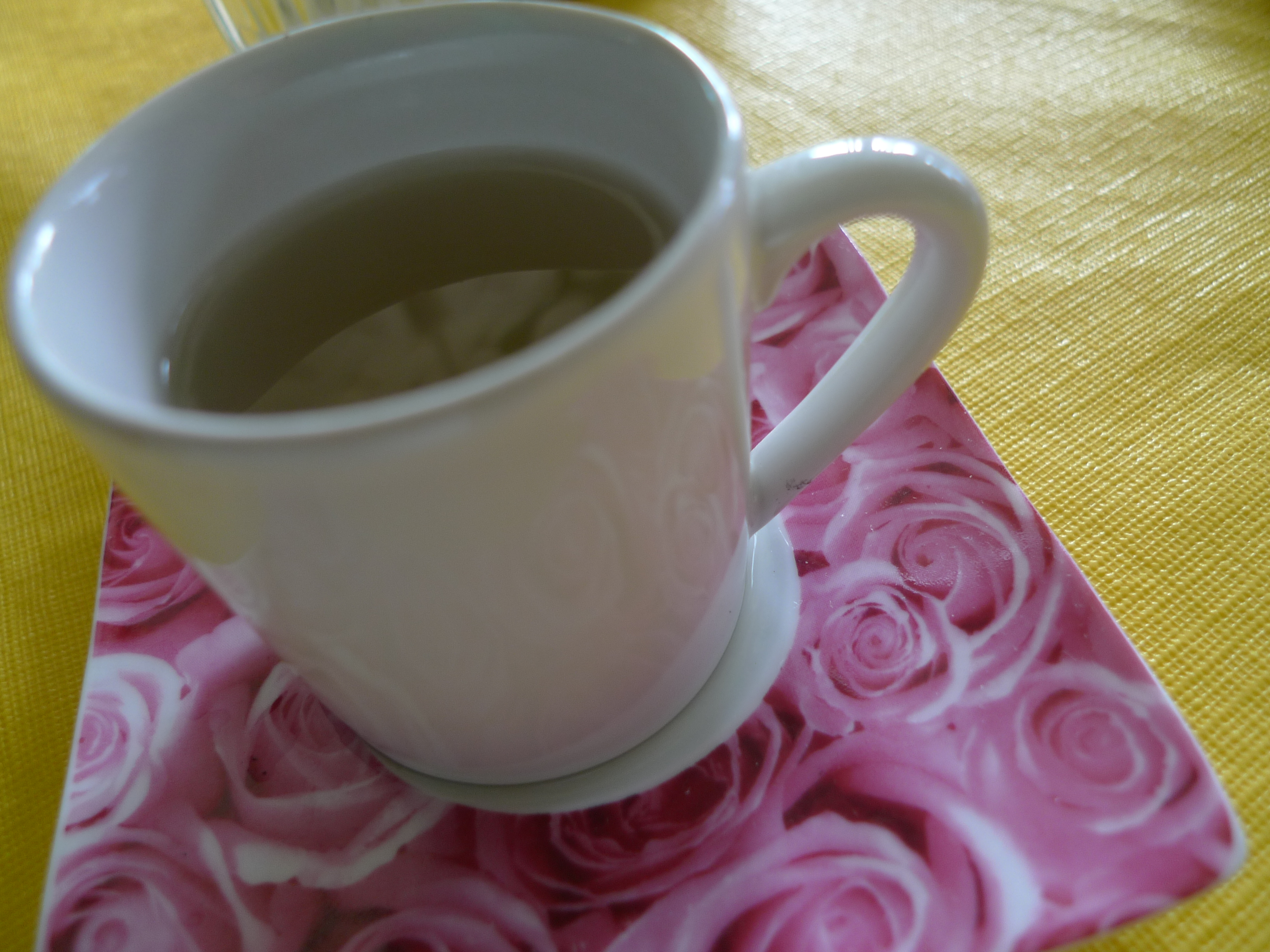
Salabat from Pampanga

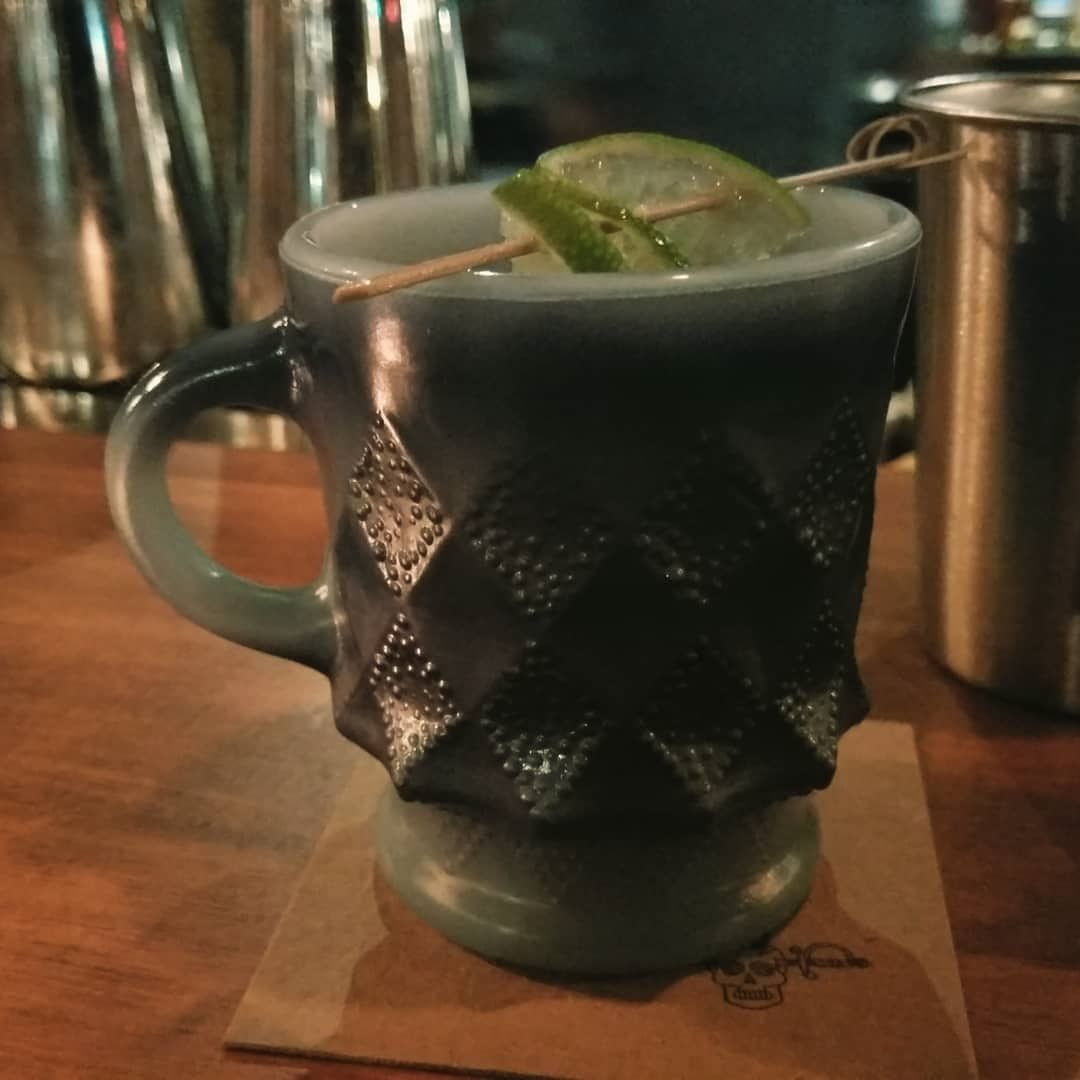
American adaptation of salabat with rye and lime

=== South Asia ===
==== India ====
In India, ginger tea is known as adrak ki chai and is a widely consumed beverage. It is made by grating ginger into brewed black tea along with milk and sugar.

Another common version is ginger lemon tea, prepared by adding ginger root to tepid lemon juice. Masala chai is often brewed by adding spices and ginger root to tea leaves, milk, and sugar.

The beverage has also been acknowledged as having several key health benefits including boosting immunity, relieving nausea and reducing inflammation. During the Tang Dynasty, tea was flavored to counteract the bitter taste. Ginger was a favorite among tea drinkers, along with onions, orange peel, cloves, and mint.

In many parts of South Asia it is a popular winter drink and is consumed while recovering from colds and digestive discomfort.

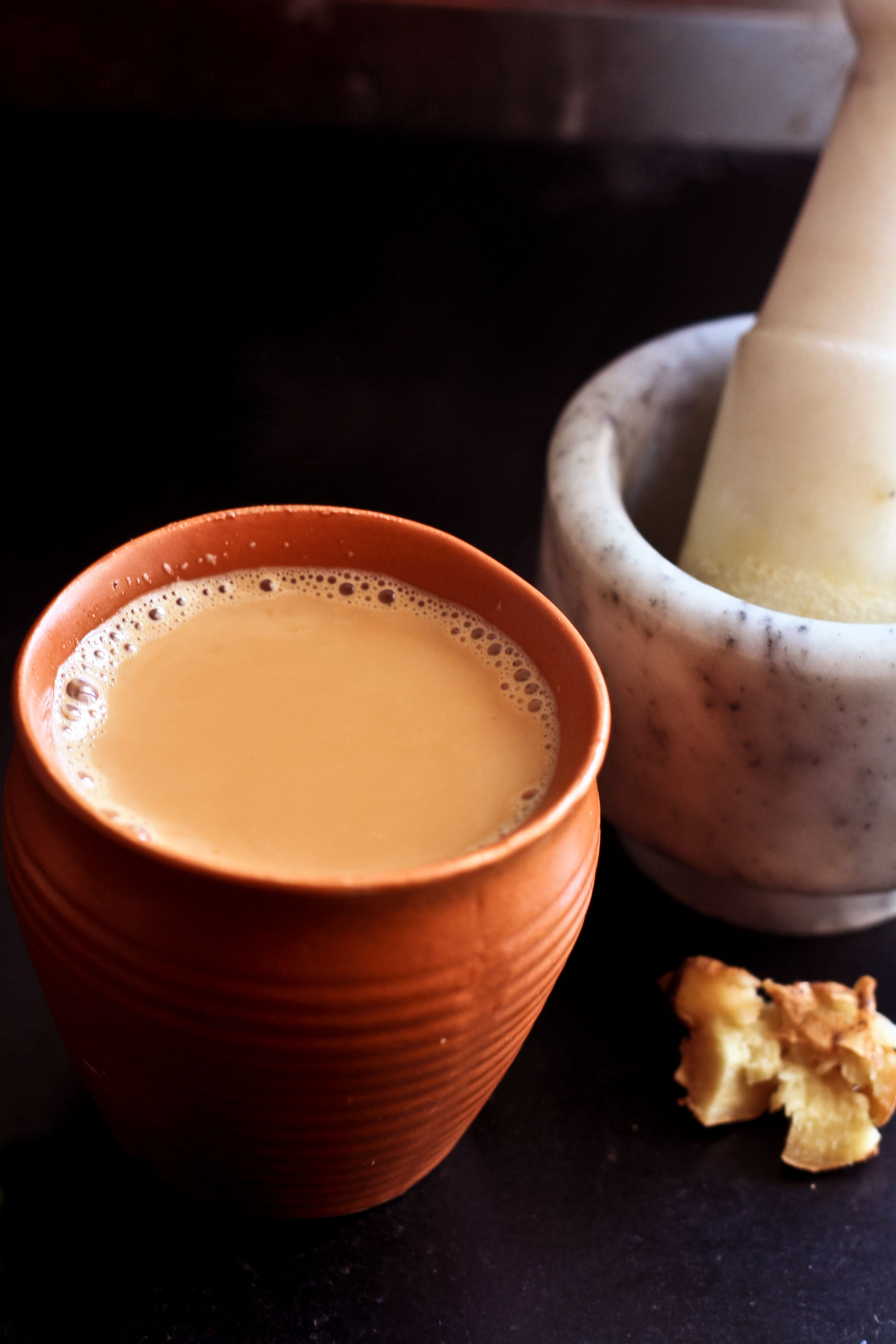
Adrak chai (Indian ginger tea)

==== Pakistan ====
In Pakistan, ginger tea is often called “adrak wali chai”. It is commonly prepared in winter for warmth and used as a soothing drink for digestion or coughs. It is widely consumed at home and by street vendors.

==== Sri Lanka ====
In Sri Lanka, a traditional herbal drink called Koththamalli (coriander-ginger tea) is sometimes used in place of plain ginger tea. The drink is made by brewing fresh ginger with coriander seeds (and sometimes pepper or jaggery), and is traditionally consumed to relieve colds, soothe the throat, and aid digestion.

==== Nepal ====
In Nepal, it is common to add ginger to milk-tea (locally called “chiya”), especially in colder or mountainous regions. Many Nepali households include ginger (and sometimes other spices) in milk tea during winter for its warming and soothing properties.

== See also ==
- Ginger ale
- Ginger beer
- Traditional Korean tea
- Bajigur
- Bandrek
- List of hot beverages
- List of Indonesian beverages
- Masala chai
- Tisane (herbal tea)
