= Bajigur =

Indonesian hot and sweet beverage

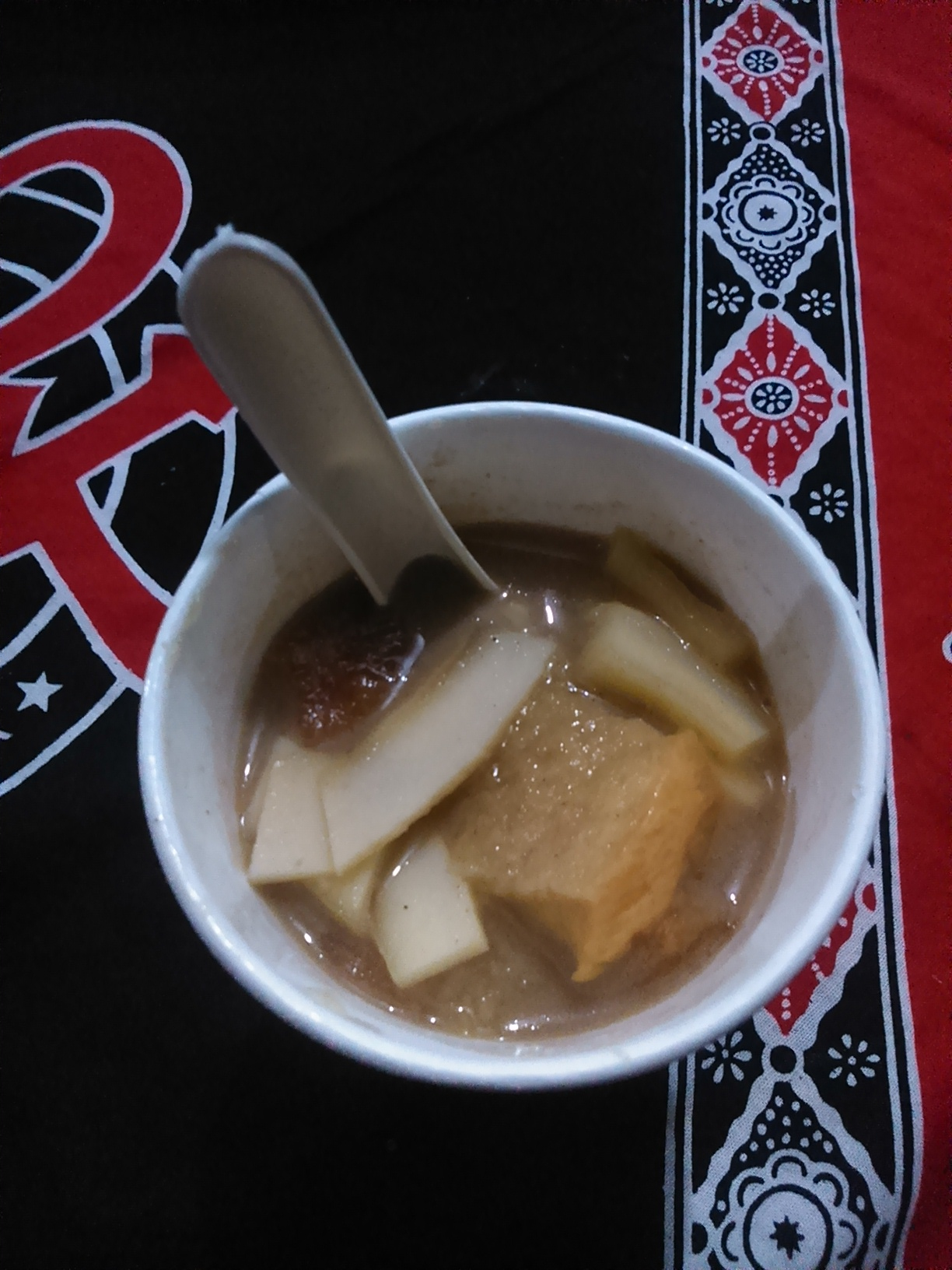
- Bajigur with bits of bread, palm sugar and young coconut
- Course: Beverage
- Place of origin: Indonesia
- Region or state: West Java
- Created by: Sundanese cuisine
- Serving temperature: Hot
- Main ingredients: coconut milk, palm sugar, coffee, young coconut and crumbled bread loaf

Bajigur is a hot and sweet beverage native to the Sundanese people of West Java, Indonesia. The main ingredients are coconut milk and Aren sugar; usually to add taste, a small amount of ginger and a small pinch of salt. Traditionally fragrant pandan leaves were added, but now often artificial vanilla powder is used. It can also include kopi tubruk, finely pounded coffee.

This beverage is served hot and is sold through vendor carts traveling in villages and residential areas. The carts are equipped with portable stoves to keep the beverage hot. Bajigur is considered suitable to be consumed in cool highlands, or during cold nights or rainy days to warm oneself. The beverage is usually accompanied with traditional snacks such as steamed banana, boiled sweet potato or boiled peanuts.

In Javanese language, the term "bajigur" was used as a minced oath for the swear word "bajingan" or "bajirut".

== See also ==
- Bandrek - a similar Indonesian drink, with ginger
- List of hot beverages
- List of Indonesian beverages
- Wedang Jahe
