= Cocopandan syrup =

Syrup in Southeast Asian cuisines

Cocopandan syrup is a common product in Southeast Asian cuisines. It is made from coconut syrup and pandan juice. Cocopandan syrup is, without colors added, clear/colorless or white. In Indonesia, cocopandan syrup is in red colour, because it is mixed with roselle.

== See also ==
- Es kelapa muda
- Es teler
