= Es campur =

Indonesian iced sweet dessert

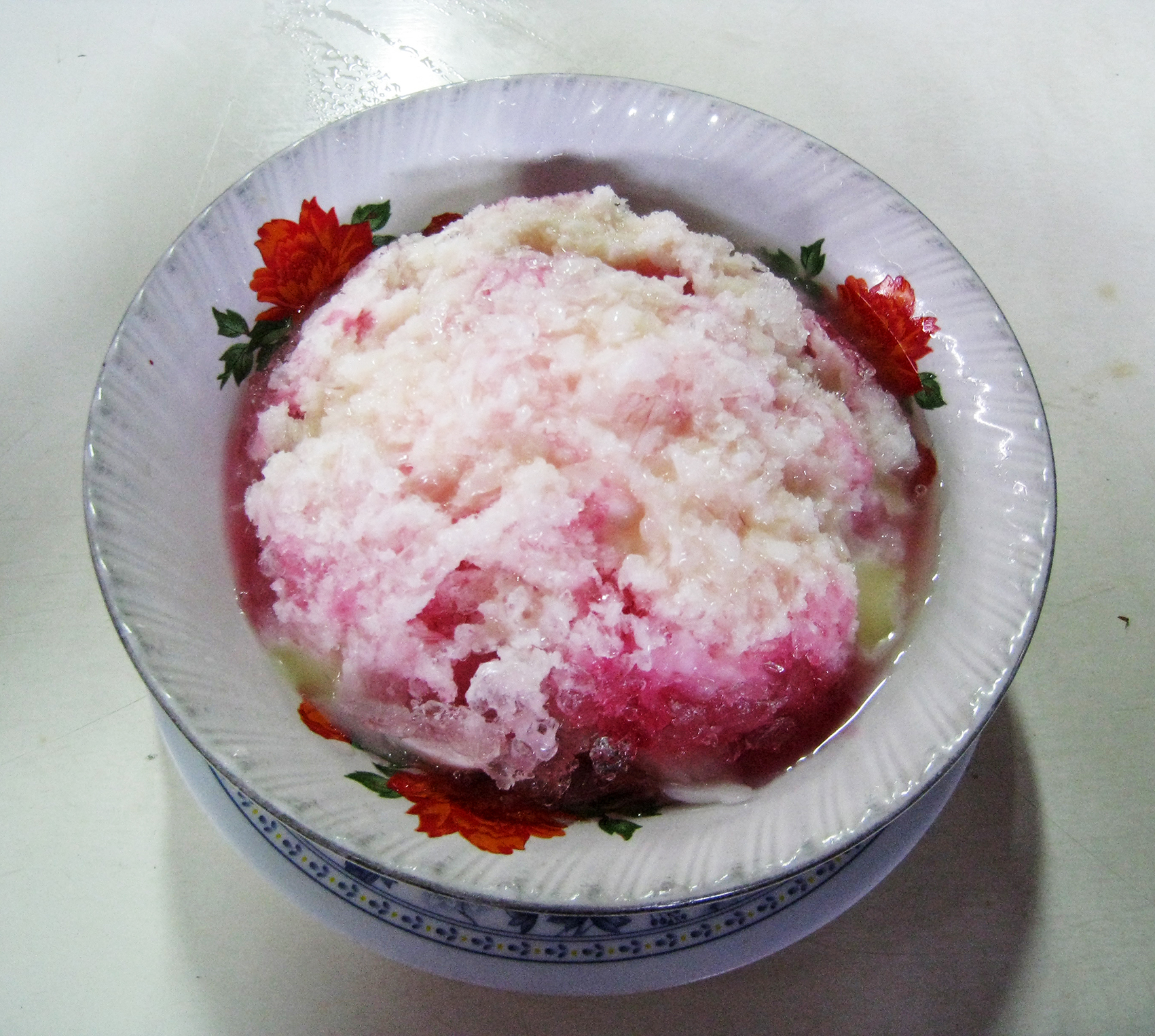
- Course: Dessert
- Place of origin: Indonesia
- Region or state: Nationwide in Indonesia, also popular in Southeast Asia
- Serving temperature: Cold
- Main ingredients: Shaved ice, coconut, various fruits, grass jelly, syrup, condensed milk

Es campur (Indonesian for "mixed ice") is an Indonesian cold dessert that typically contains fruit, coconut, tapioca pearls, grass jelly, and other ingredients served in shaved ice, syrup, and condensed milk.

For Indonesian Muslims, es campur and kolak are popular treats during Ramadan for iftar, often sold prior to breaking the fast.

There is no set recipe. Other common ingredients are seaweed, milk, syrup, jackfruit, and many others.

== See also ==
- Es doger
- Es teler
