= Es teler =

Indonesian fruit cocktail

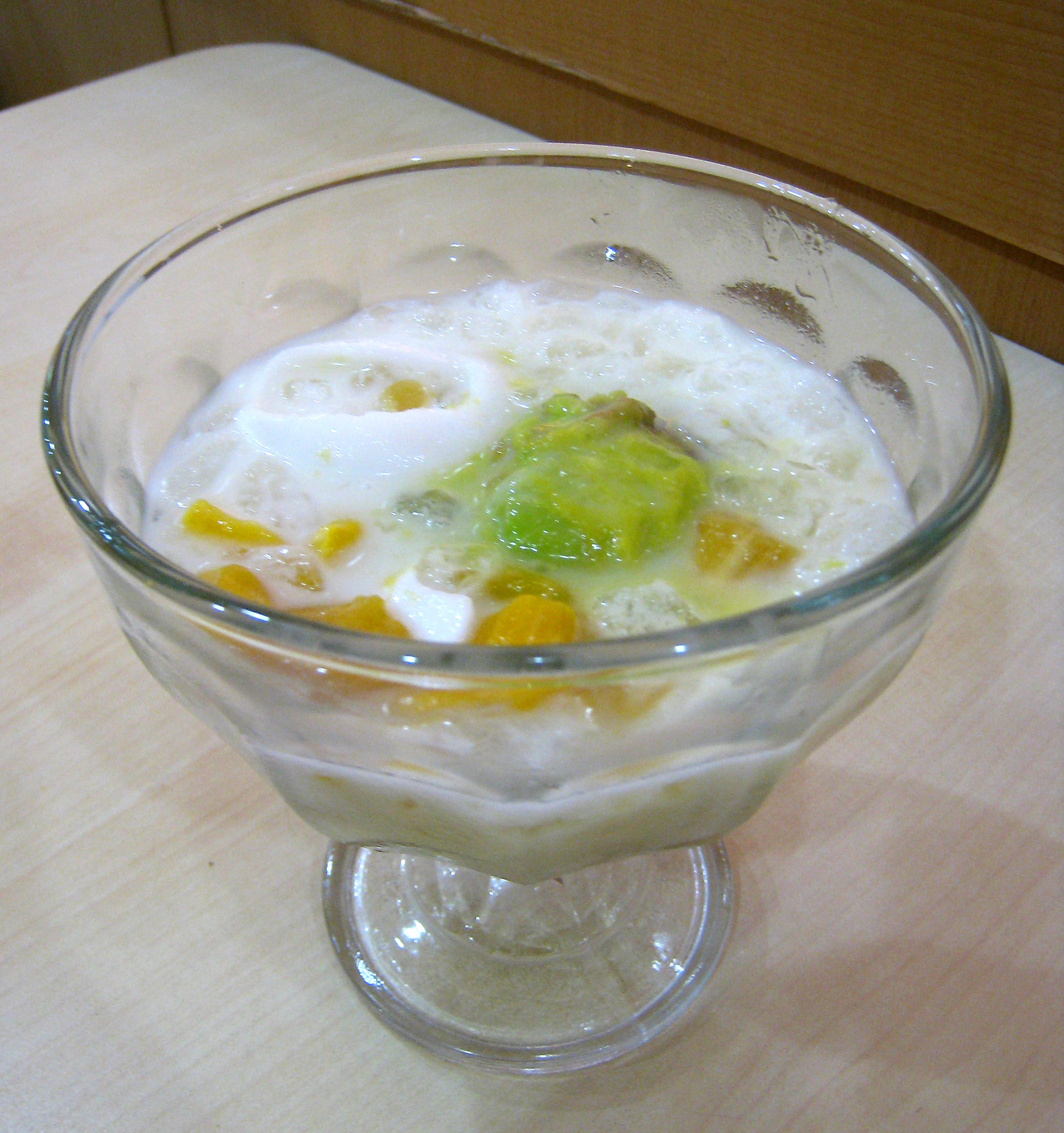
- A bowl of es teler
- Course: Dessert
- Place of origin: Indonesia
- Region or state: Nationwide in Indonesia, also Southeast Asia
- Serving temperature: Cold
- Main ingredients: Kachang ice, coconut, avocado, jackfruit, condensed milk

Es teler is an Indonesian Iced dessert drink. It is considered a fruit cocktail. Traditionally, it is served in an individual drinking glass or a dessert bowl. It is composed of native ingredients such as jackfruit, strips of a young coconut (kelapa muda), and chunks of a ripe avocado. It also contains finely crushed ice and sweetened condensed milk. It is also has a sweep syrup, which the contents of the syrup are unknown because it is heavily guarded by the creator, Murniati Widjaja. It sometimes may have (Pandanus amaryllifolius leaf (normally in the form of cocopandan syrup), sugar, a tiny amount of salt and is usually served cold).

== Etymology ==
Despite the literal translation of its name, Es teler is a non-alcoholic drink. Its name is derived from two Indonesian words. Es meaning Ice in Indonesian and teler, a colloquial term to describe a state of intoxication or being dazed, in other words affects related to alcohol. The name was not intended to actually be Es teler on conception of the drink, but a customer made an remark that the drink was so delicious that it could make someone feel teler.

Wah, es ini enak sekali, bikin orang teler!

— Customer

== History ==
This concoction was created by Murniati Widjaja, who won first place in a competition to come up with a national drink for Indonesia in 1982. Soon after, Murniati Widjaja recognized the commercial potential of the award-winning drinks, in which her husband called it the "Juara Indonesia". As a result, an enterprise was founded after the drink, known as Es teler 77 started with a tent kiosk outside a shopping center, operated by a team of five workers.

== See also ==
- Es campur
- Halo-halo
- Cendol
- Ais kacang
- List of fruit dishes
