= Beer in Indonesia =

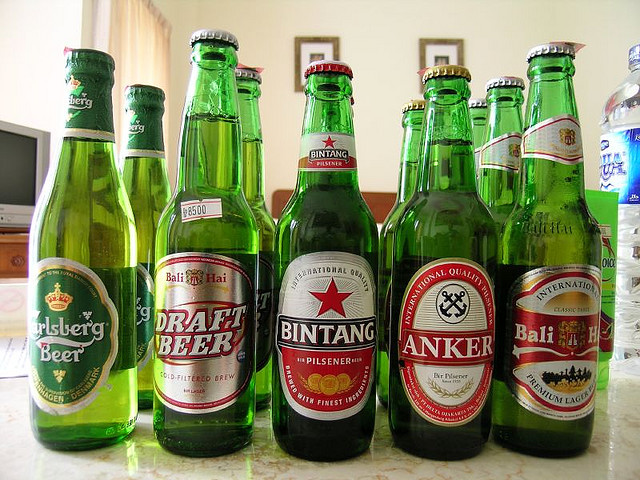
A beer assortment sold in Bali, Indonesia; Carlsberg, Bali Hai, Bintang and Anker Beer.

The history of beer in Indonesia started in 1929, when the Heineken beer company established its first brewery factory in Surabaya, East Java, during Dutch colonial rule of Indonesia. This was one of the earliest beer enterprise in Southeast Asia. In July 1931 the Archipel Brouwerij Compagnie (Archipelago Brewery Co.) was formed in Batavia (now known as Jakarta), by German brewer, Beck's, constructing breweries in both Singapore and Batavia. By 1960s, Indonesians developed their own local brands of beer, which includes Bintang Beer (nationalized from Heineken) and Anker Beer.

== Regulations ==
As a Muslim majority country, alcohol industry faces ongoing opposition from Islamic parties and extremist groups in the country. Islamic dietary law prescribed prohibition against alcohol consumption. Because of various regulations, alcohol sales are declining in Indonesia.

== Market shares ==
Currently, PT Multi Bintang Indonesia Tbk is the largest domestic brewery of Indonesia, with its Bintang Beer leading the market as the largest selling beer of Indonesia. Multi Bintang Indonesia lead the Indonesian beer market with a commanding total volume share of over 61% in 2012.

Multi Bintang is a subsidiary of Heineken Asia Pacific. In 2011, Bintang Beer won the Gold Medal for Lager Beer Category and awarded 'Champion Beer 2011' at the world's class beer competition, the Brewing Industry International Award (BIIA 2011) in London. In 2014 Bintang Radler was introduced which was the first flavoured beer produced domestically in Indonesia.

Other major beer producers are Delta Djakarta known for its Anker Beer, and PT Bali Hai Brewery Indonesia known for its Bali Hai. Indonesia also produced under license other brands including San Miguel Beer and Asahi beer.

== Indonesian breweries ==
- PT Multi Bintang
- PT Delta Djakarta
- PT Bali Hai Brewery Indonesia

== See also ==
- Alcohol in Indonesia
- Beer and breweries by region
- Beer in Asia
