= Alcohol in Indonesia =

Indonesian brewery

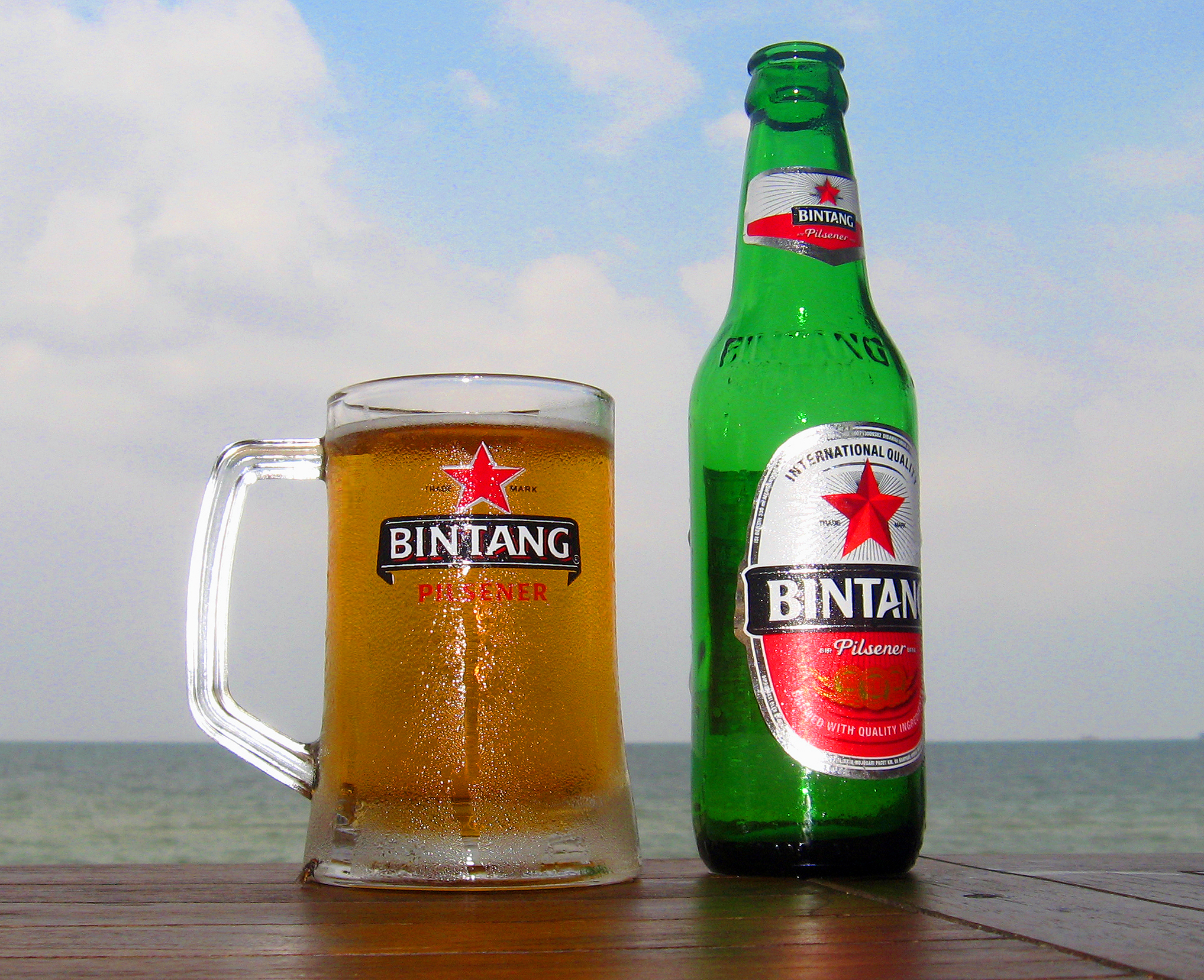
Bintang Beer is Indonesia's best selling beer.

Alcohol in Indonesia refers to the alcohol industry, alcohol consumption and laws related to alcohol in the South East Asian country of Indonesia. Indonesia is a Muslim majority country, yet it is also a pluralist, democratic and secular nation. These social and demographic conditions led to Islamic parties and pressure groups pushing the government to restrict alcohol consumption and trade, while the government carefully considers the rights of non-Muslims and consenting adults to consume alcohol, and estimates the possible alcohol ban effects on Indonesian tourism and the economy.

Currently, there are no alcohol bans being enforced in Indonesia, with the exception of Aceh. Since 2014, anyone found consuming alcohol or breaching the codes on moral conduct, whether residents or visitors to Aceh, could face between six and nine cane lashes. In other parts of Indonesia, to appease the Islamic parties and pressure groups, the government agreed to apply mild restriction measures on alcohol, which includes high taxation and limited bans. Indonesia is among the countries that apply high taxes on imported alcoholic beverages; in 2015, import tax on alcohol jumped to 150%. Also in 2015, the Indonesian government banned the sale of alcohol from minimarkets and small shops, with the exception of Bali province, though sale was allowed in supermarkets, restaurants, bars, clubs and hotels. Nevertheless, in more cosmopolitan Indonesian cities like Jakarta, Medan and Surabaya, and also in tourism hotspots such as Bali, Yogyakarta and Batam, alcoholic beverages are readily available, yet with higher prices, owing to the high tax applied upon alcoholic beverages.

In February 2016, Indonesian Malt Beverage Producers Association (GIMMI) called the House of Representatives to draft for comprehensive regulations on the chain of production and the marketing of alcoholic beverages, instead of total prohibition.

== History and traditions ==
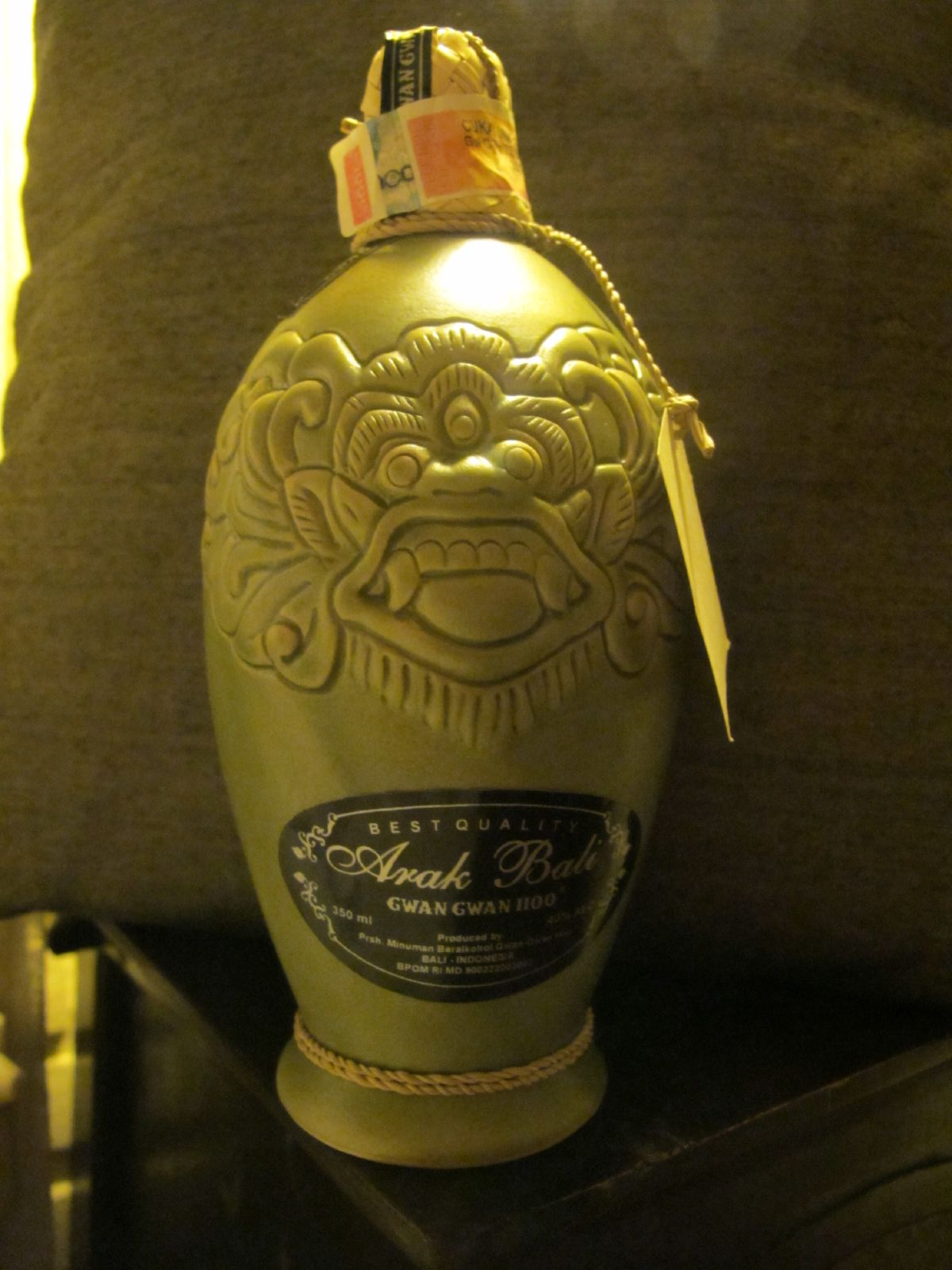
Fancy bottled Arak Bali as souvenir.

Since ancient times, local alcoholic beverages were developed by natives in the archipelago. Some panels in 9th century Borobudur bas-reliefs depicted drink vendors, warung (small restaurant), and there is a panel depicting a building with people drinking (possibly alcoholic beverages), dancing and having fun, seeming to depict a tavern or lodging house. According to a Chinese source, Yingya Shenglan (c. 15th century) the people of Java in Majapahit kingdom drank wine made from palm sap called tuak (palm wine). However, by the 16th century Islam began to supplant Hinduism and Buddhism as the major religion in Indonesia. Since then, as a Muslim-majority country, Indonesian Muslims share Islamic dietary laws that prohibit alcoholic beverages. Nevertheless, the local alcohol-drinking culture still survives, at least among less-religious members of society and among the non-Muslim community. Certain ethno-cultural regions which are predominantly Christian are known for their affinity to alcohol-drinking traditions; such as the Batak, Torajan, Minahasan, Ambonese and Papuan.

Indonesia has its own traditional alcoholic beverages prepared by fermenting rice grain, gluten, sugar palm sap, and coconuts. According to culinary expert William Wongso, the culture of drinking distilled alcohol was never strong in Indonesia, with only a few regions having developed it.

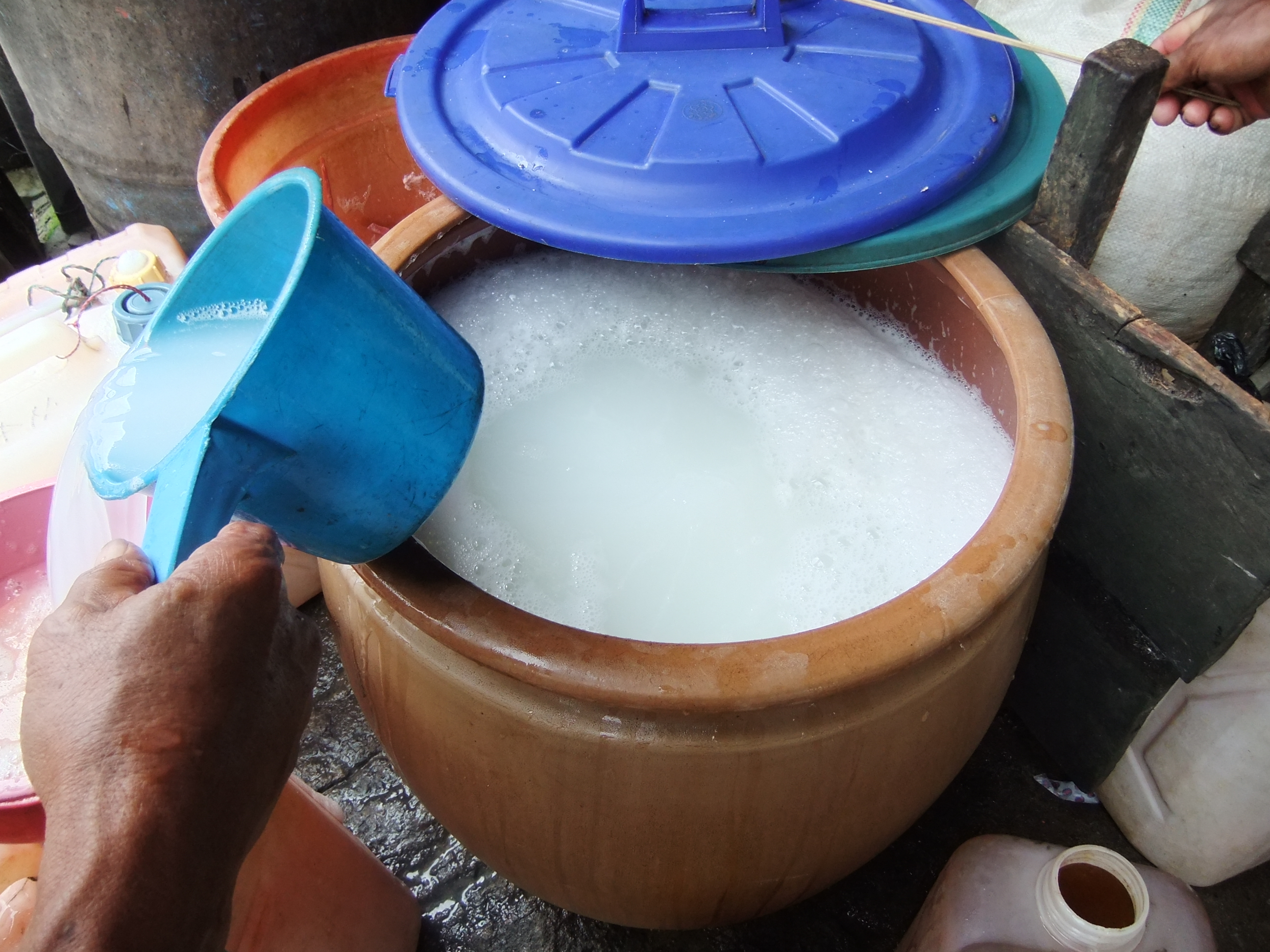
Ballo traditional alcohol beverage from Toraja, South Sulawesi.

In the Batak community in North Sumatra, tuak (palm liquor) is a compulsory drink in the celebrations and became a tradition in the community. Batak tribes are predominantly of Christian Protestant faith, yet some of its clans are Muslim. A traditional Batak bar serving tuak is called a lapo tuak.

In the Toraja lands of South Sulawesi, their version of tuak — made from fermented sugar palm sap, is called ballo. In Torajan traditional ceremonies, rituals and celebrations, ballo is always served, either as a prerequisite for the ritual; as an offering for ancestral spirits, as well as for drinks for guests. Ballo is also commonly consumed by the neighboring Bugis ethnic group.

In the Minahasa region of North Sulawesi, an almost identical palm liquor, also made from sugar palm sap, is called saguer. In Nusa Tenggara and Maluku Islands the people also drink palm wine, locally known as sopi.

Also in the Minahasa region, the people drink a highly alcoholic drink called cap tikus (lit. "rodent brand"). Cap tikus is made from distilled saguer or sopi (palm wine), which increases its alcohol content. The origin of cap tikus brand is unclear. It is suggested that circa 1820s, prior to the 1830 Java War, the KNIL Minahasan legion found and bought distilled saguer or sopi sold in blue bottles embossed with the image of mouse sold by a Chinese merchant in Fort Amsterdam in Manado. Today however, because of poor regulation on alcohol production in this region, this traditional home-made cap tikus industry is considered as an illegal beverage, due to the high prevalence of mortal alcohol poisoning.

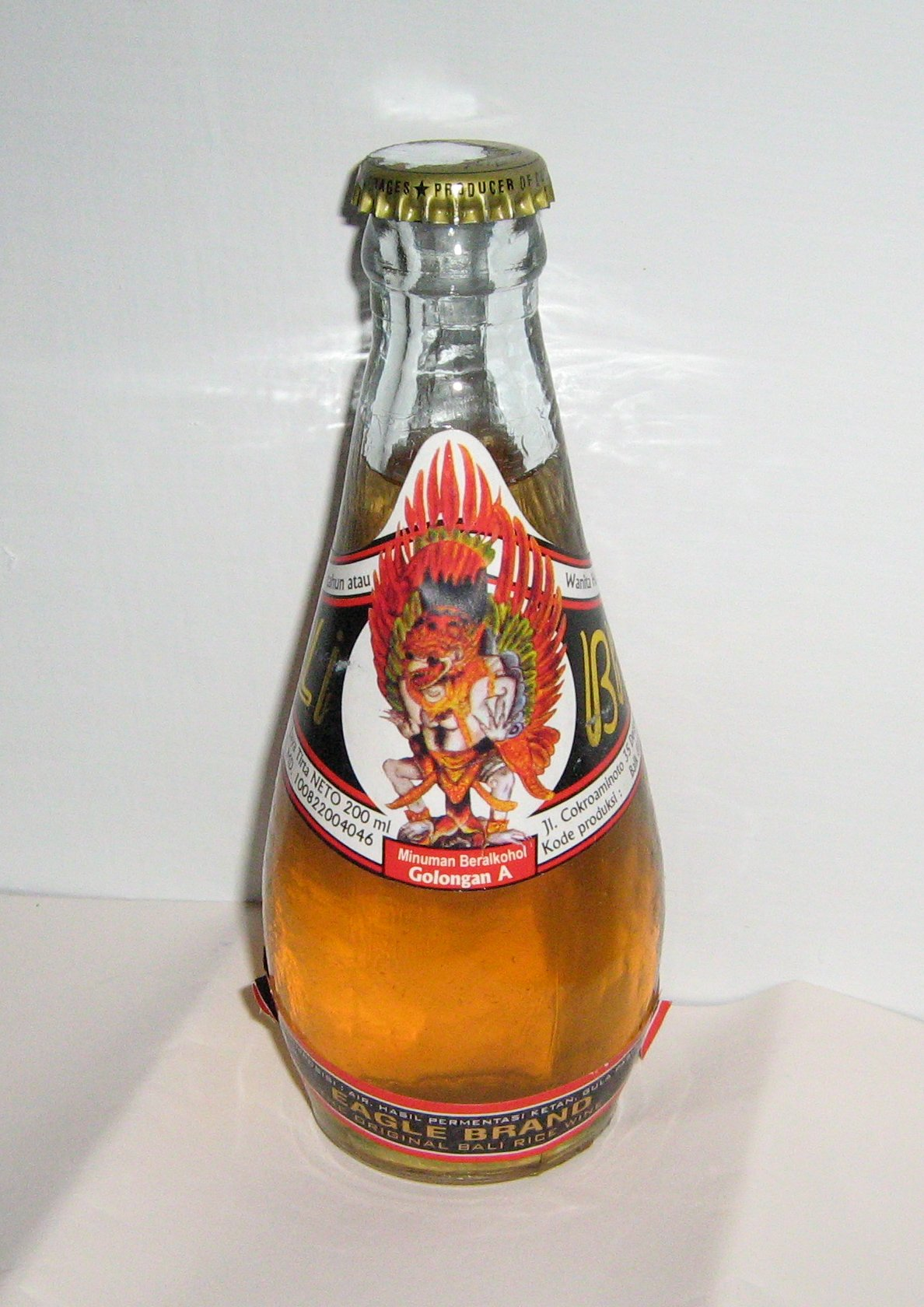
Eagle brand Balinese brem (5% alcohol).

Bottled brem bali (Balinese rice wine) and arrack are popular beverages in the Hindu-majority island of Bali. Brem is a brownish colored liquor with 5% alcohol. It is also exported to Japan and China. For Balinese people it has a religious significance too. Brem, arak and tuak are required for tabuhan (offerings) to the gods.

In Solo, Central Java, ciu, a local adaptation of Chinese wine, made from cider molasses of sugarcane is well known. It is linked to Solo's history as a sugar plantation and production center in colonial times.

The Dutch Colonial state was established in Indonesia in the 1800s. The colonial Dutch brought their European drinking culture to the East Indies, most prominently with beer. The Heineken beer company established its brewery factory in Surabaya in 1929 during the Dutch colonial rule of Indonesia. By the 1960s, Indonesians developed their own local brands of beer, which included Bintang Beer (nationalized from Heineken) and Anker Beer.

In April 2019, the East Nusa Tenggara provincial government supported the legal aspect of production and distribution of sopi, a local traditional alcoholic beverage. This policy is very likely to make sopi the first fully supported alcoholic product by the local government in Indonesia.

== Regulation ==
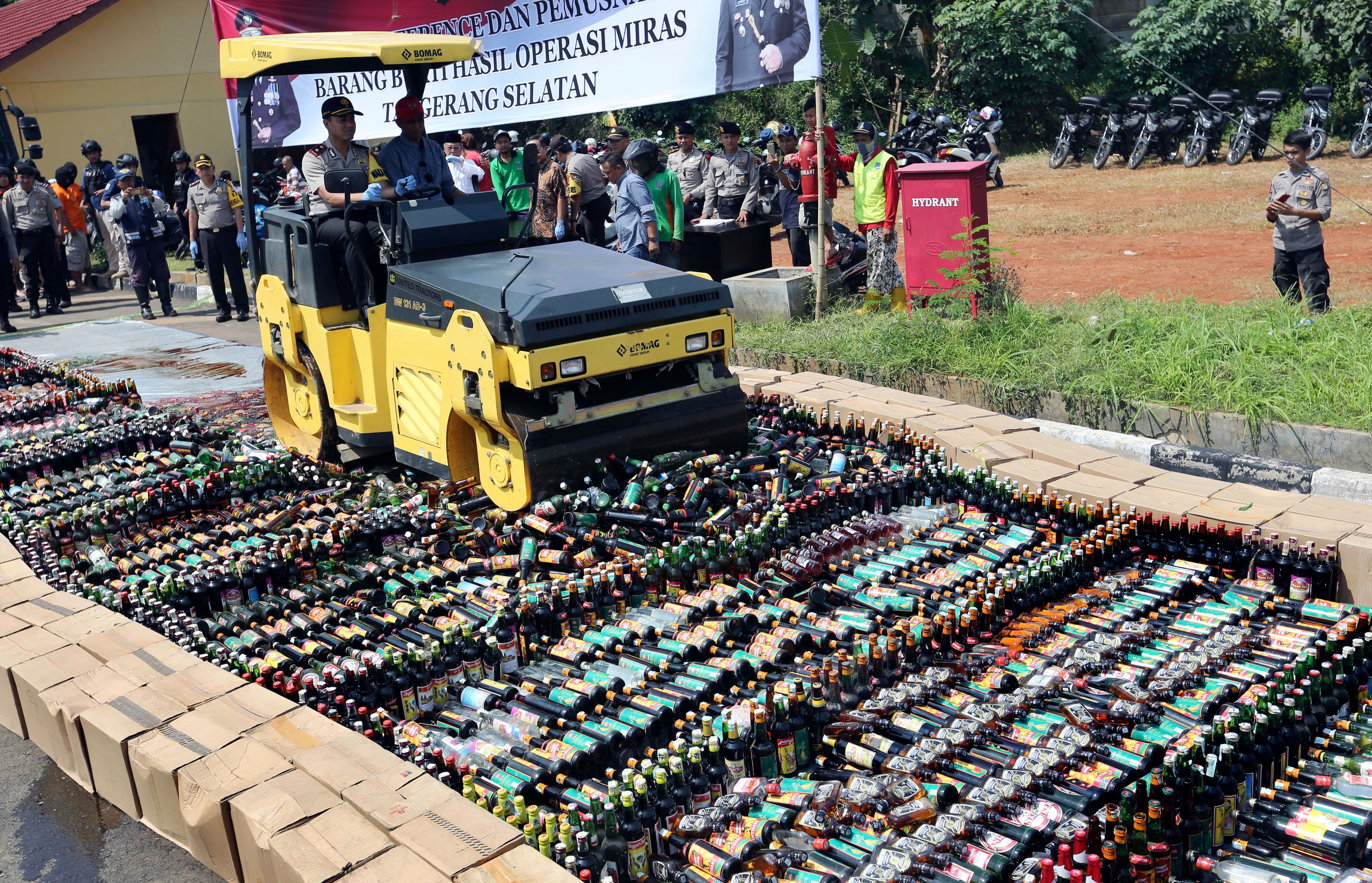
Police destroy confiscated illegal alcohol in South Tangerang, Banten, 2018

A Presidential regulation signed by Susilo Bambang Yudhoyono in 2013 gave legal cover to distribution of alcohol, it classified alcoholic beverages in Indonesia in three categories. Drinks having an alcohol percentage less than 5% (A class), 5%–20% (B class) and more than 20% (C class). It was replacement of the 1997 decree after the Supreme Court abolished it following appeals from hard-line religious groups like the Islamic Defenders Front. The 2012 court ruling came after a draft bill proposed by the United Development Party (PPP) to completely ban the sale, production and consumption of alcohol in Indonesia. However, the 2013 presidential regulation was welcomed by travel agencies in the wake of the harmful effects of the proposed draft on tourism.

Prices of wine and spirits in Indonesia increased by 140.5% and 154.4% respectively between 2009 and 2014. In 2015 the government further hiked the import tariff on wine and spirits which nearly doubled the price of alcoholic beverages.

== Industry and products ==
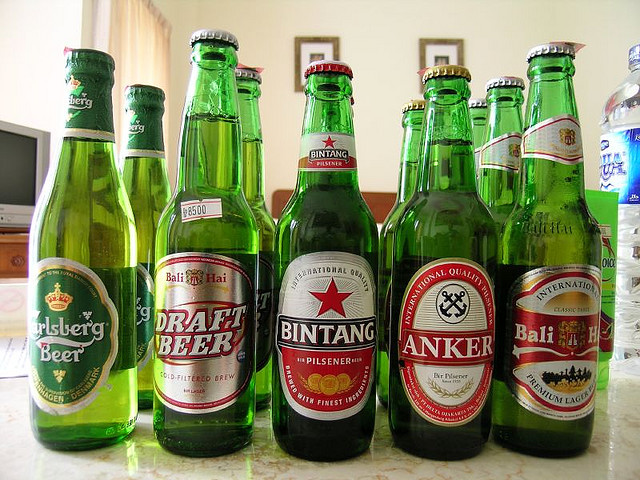
A beer assortment in Bali; Carlsberg, Bali Hai, Bintang and Anker.

Some foreign companies which sell alcohol in Indonesia are Diageo, Pernod Ricard, Remy Cointreau and Bacardi. PT Multi Bintang is the largest domestic brewery of Indonesia. As per market experts, because of various regulations, alcohol sales are declining in Indonesia.

Bintang Beer of Multi Bintang brewery is the largest selling beer of Indonesia. Multi Bintang is a subsidiary of Heineken Asia Pacific. In 2011, Bintang Beer won the Gold Medal for the Lager Beer Category and was awarded 'Champion Beer 2011' at the world's class beer competition, the Brewing Industry International Award (BIIA 2011) in London. In 2014 Bintang Radler was introduced which was the first flavored beer produced domestically in Indonesia. Other major beer producers are Delta Djakarta known for its Anker Beer, and PT Bali Hai Brewery Indonesia known for its Bali Hai. Indonesia also produces other brands, including San Miguel Beer and Asahi beer, under license. Diageo manufactures Smirnoff and Captain Morgan products in Bali, which qualifies both brands for classification as locally produced spirits.

== Illegal alcohol ==
The high prices of alcohol beverages in Indonesia, caused by high taxation and restrictions, has led to cases of illegal alcohol in the country. As the legal and imported alcoholic beverages become unaffordable, locals turn to illegal bootlegged alcohol for a cheaper drink. These illegal alcoholic drinks are known in Indonesian as alkohol oplosan (lit. "solved alcohol") and account for over 80% of the alcohol consumed in Indonesia. These illicitly produced liquors which are traditionally home-made, are considered illegal by Indonesian law, due to the high incidence of deadly alcohol poisoning. The lapen liquor from Yogyakarta for example, is made from industrial alcohol of 85% volume mixed with water with a 1:4 or 5 alcohol to water ratio; then mixed with fruit essence as a flavoring agent.

In February 2010, 16 people died and 5 lapen sellers were arrested in Yogyakarta, due to alcohol poisoning and illicit alcohol production. In September 2010, three Russian Sukhoi fighter technicians died in Makassar from methanol poisoning in their drinks. Yogyakarta residents were again affected by badly made alcohol in 2016. Other traditionally made alcoholic spirits such as Solo's ciu, Manado's cap tikus, and some Balinese arrack are known as illegal alcohol, also due to the high incidence of alcohol poisoning.

== See also ==
- List of Indonesian drinks
- Alcohol in Australia
- Alcohol in Iran
- Alcohol in Malaysia
- Alcohol in New Zealand
- List of countries by alcohol consumption
