= Alcohol in Australia =

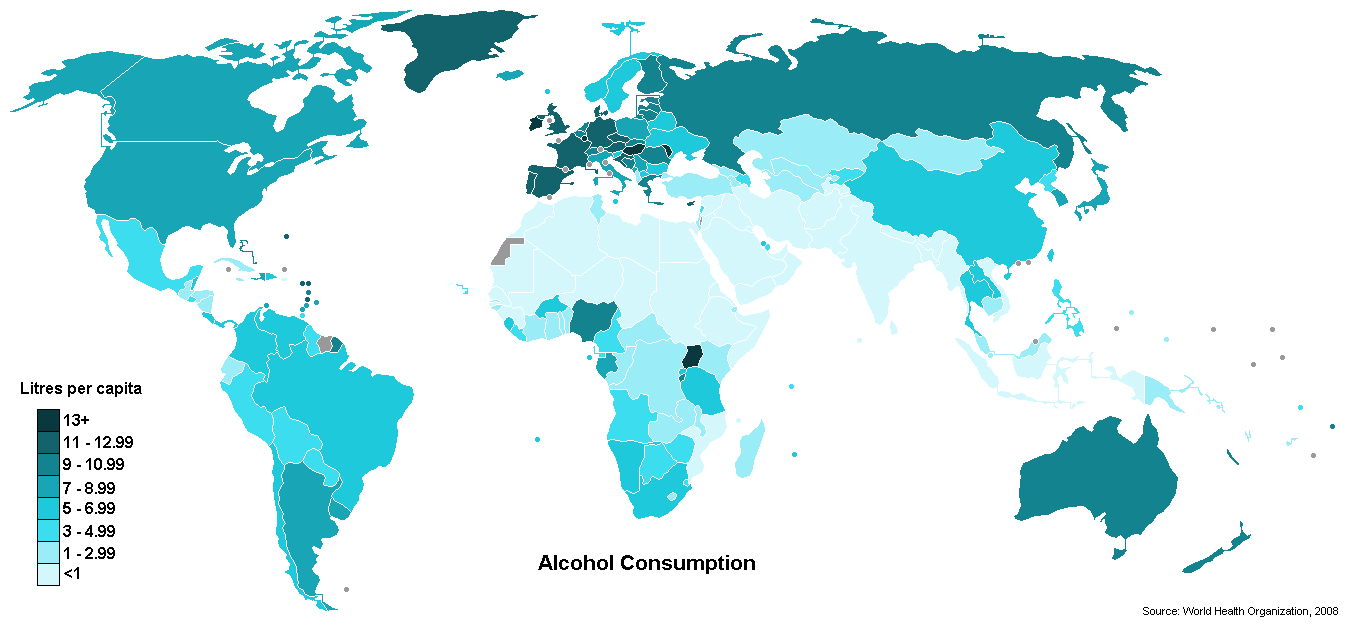
World map showing countries by annual alcohol consumption per capita, 2008

Alcohol is commonly consumed and available at pubs and liquor stores in Australia – all of which are private enterprises. Spirits can be purchased at liquor stores and pubs, whereas most grocery stores do not sell them, although they may have separate liquor stores on their premises. Alcohol consumption is higher, according to WHO studies, than in most European countries and several Central Asian and African countries, although consumption is just as high in Australia as in North America. After tobacco, alcohol is the second leading preventable cause of death and hospitalisation in Australia.

Alcohol is served in many social and recreational situations, and its use is often encouraged. While drinking alcohol is often seen as intrinsic to Australian culture, the effects associated with over-consumption do not just affect the individual, but also the wider national community. In 2012, it was estimated that Australians spent $14.1 billion each year on alcohol.

== History ==
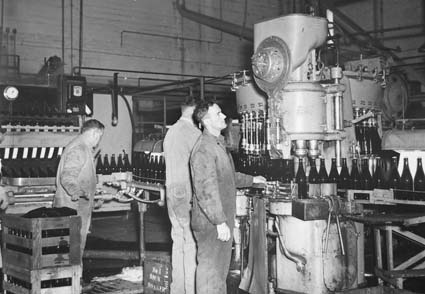
Australian Beer Production in 1945

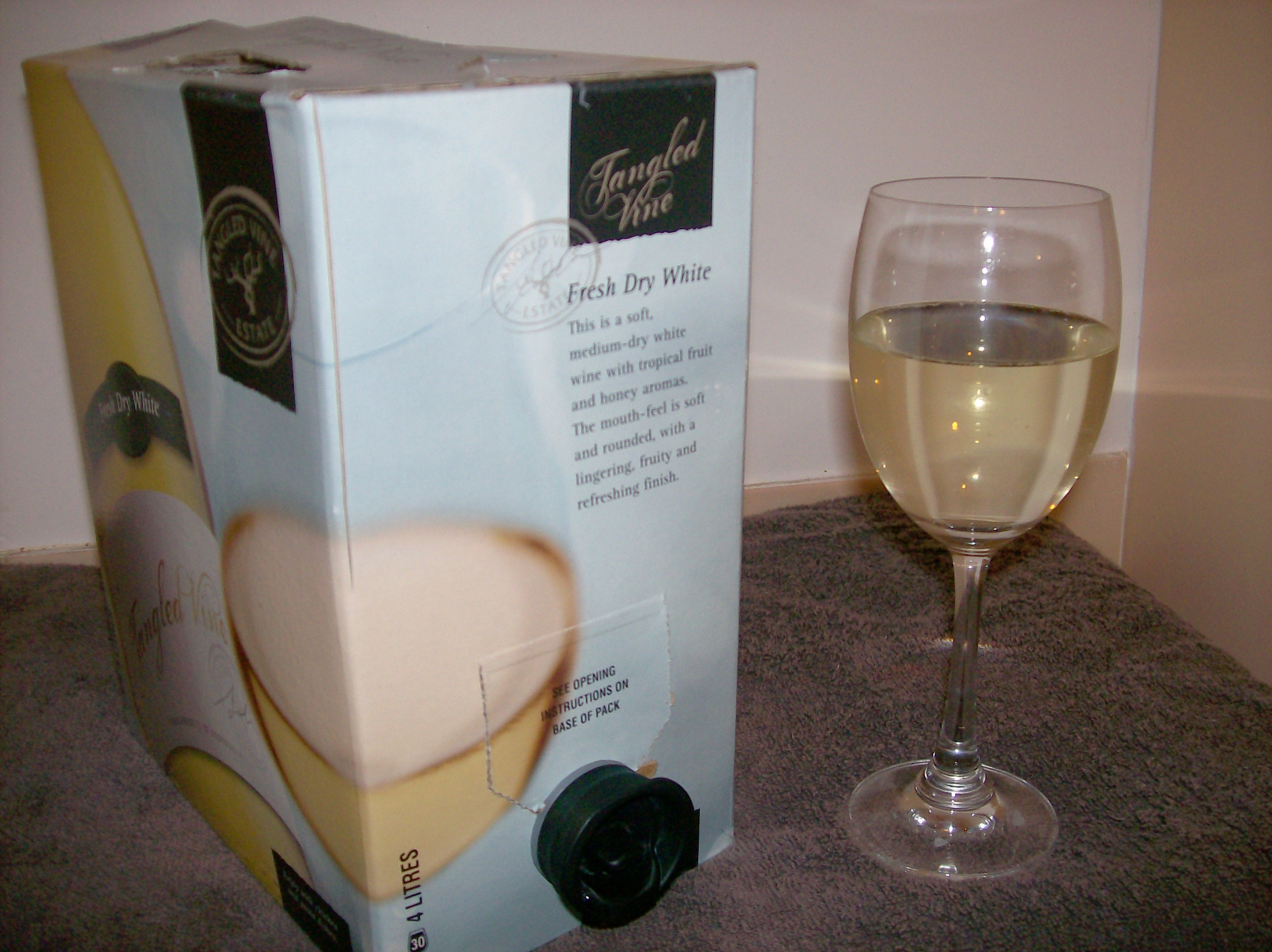
The wine cask was invented in 1965 by South Australian winemaker Thomas Angove.

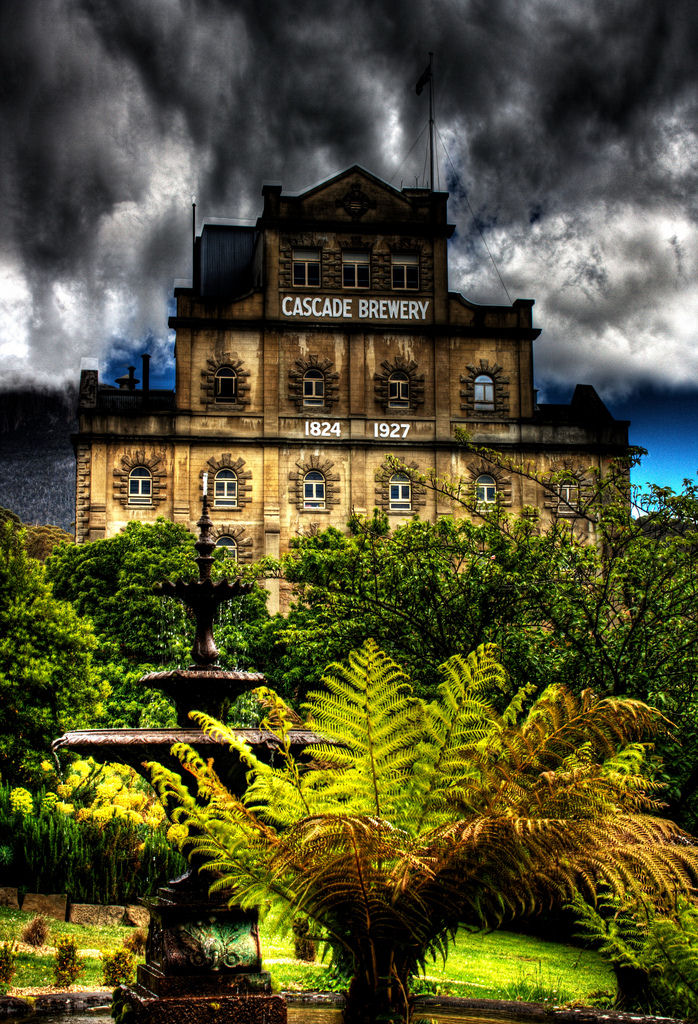
The oldest brewery in Australia is the Cascade Brewery in Tasmania, which was established in 1824.

Heavy drinking in Australia was a cultural norm following colonisation. For a period, convicts in Australia were partially paid with rum. The distribution of rum amongst the New South Wales Corps led to the only successful armed takeover of an Australian government, which later became known as the Rum Rebellion of 1808. Spirits were the most widely consumed alcoholic beverages in Australia in the 1830s, with early conservative estimates showing that 3.6 litres of pure alcohol were consumed by each person in New South Wales annually.

In the 1830s, the Temperance Movement gained a following in New South Wales. Its influence peaked during World War I and the Great Depression. An attempt to prohibit alcohol on the Victorian Goldfields was made in 1852. This was the main factor leading to the growth in sly-grog shops. Alcohol sales were prohibited in the Australian Capital Territory between 1910 and 1928. Four referendums regarding the prohibition of alcohol were conducted in Western Australia, including one in each of the years 1911, 1921, 1925 and 1950. In 1837, laws were passed to prevent Aboriginal access to alcohol as binge drinking became problematic.

In a failed attempt to reduce the effects of alcohol on society, liquor establishments in most Australian states were forced to close by 6 pm from the 1910s to the 1960s. Rather than reduce alcohol consumption, the measures led to excessive drinking in the hour before closing time which became known as the six o'clock swill.

In the decade after World War II there was a steep rise in the consumption of beer in Australia. Since the 1960s the popularity of beer has declined while wine consumption increased. The consumption of alcohol increased from the mid-1960s to the early 1980s when it began to decline until it reached a consumption level commensurate with 1961 in 2003. Consumption peaked in 1974 and 1975 when an average of 13.09 litres of pure alcohol was consumed.

In March 1965, Merle Thornton and Rosalie Bogner secured themselves to the foot rail of Brisbane's Regatta Hotel with a dog chain to protest laws excluding them, as women, from drinking with men at public bars. In 1965, a South Australian winemaker Thomas Angove, invented the box wine or wine cask. The following four decades saw an increase in per capita wine consumption and a decrease in beer drinking. However the market value of beer sales increased as the sales of up-market or boutique beers gained in popularity.

In 2005, Queensland introduced a lockout trial in order to reduce alcohol-related violence at three entertainment precincts which saw patrons barred from re-entering a licensed venue after 3 am. Victoria introduced a similar initiative known as the 2am Lockout in 2008. The 2010 Melbourne live music rally was a public rally to protest the claimed effects of liquor licensing laws on live music in the city.

== Consumption ==
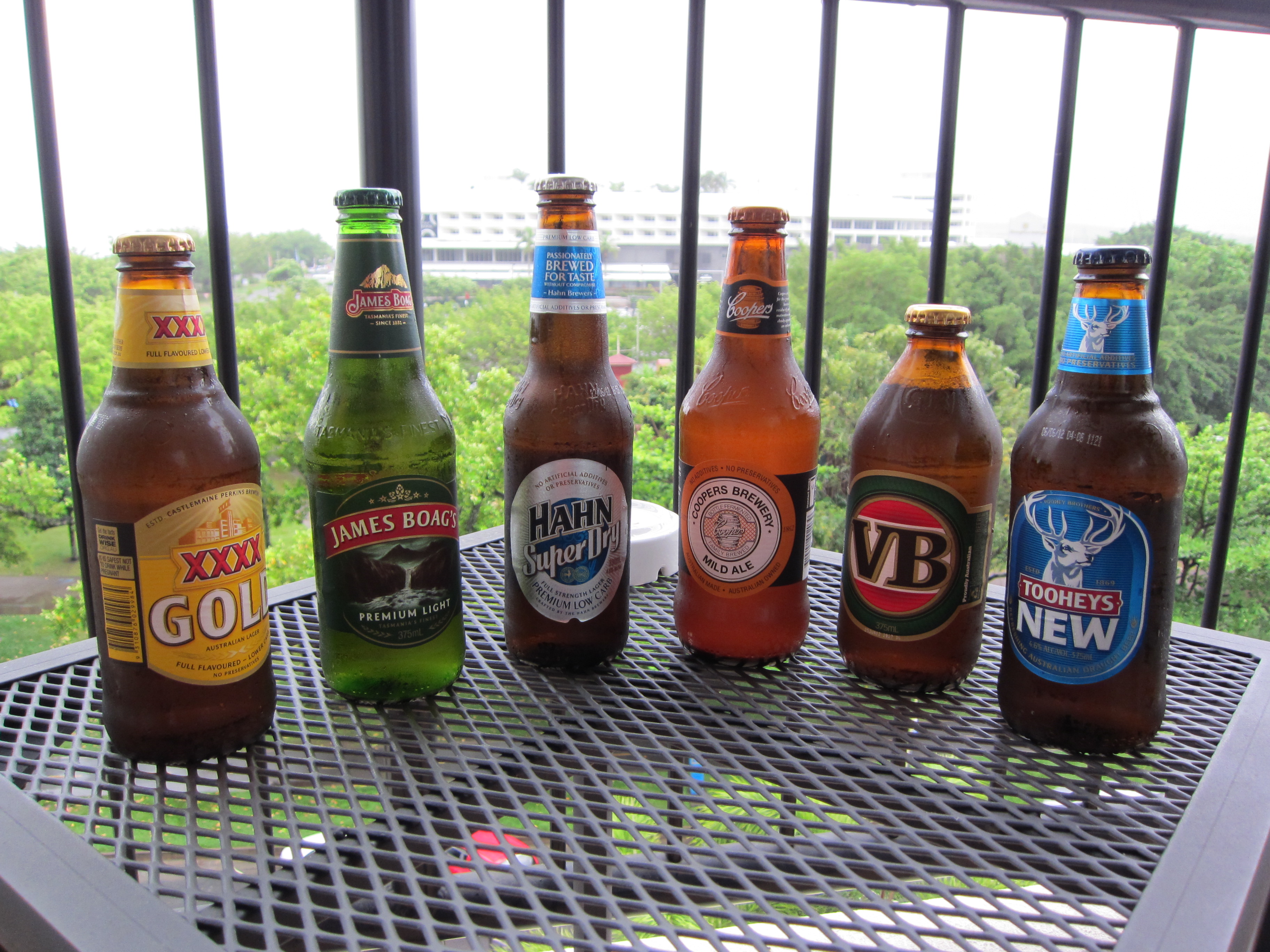
XXXX Gold was Australia's top-selling beer by volume in 2012.

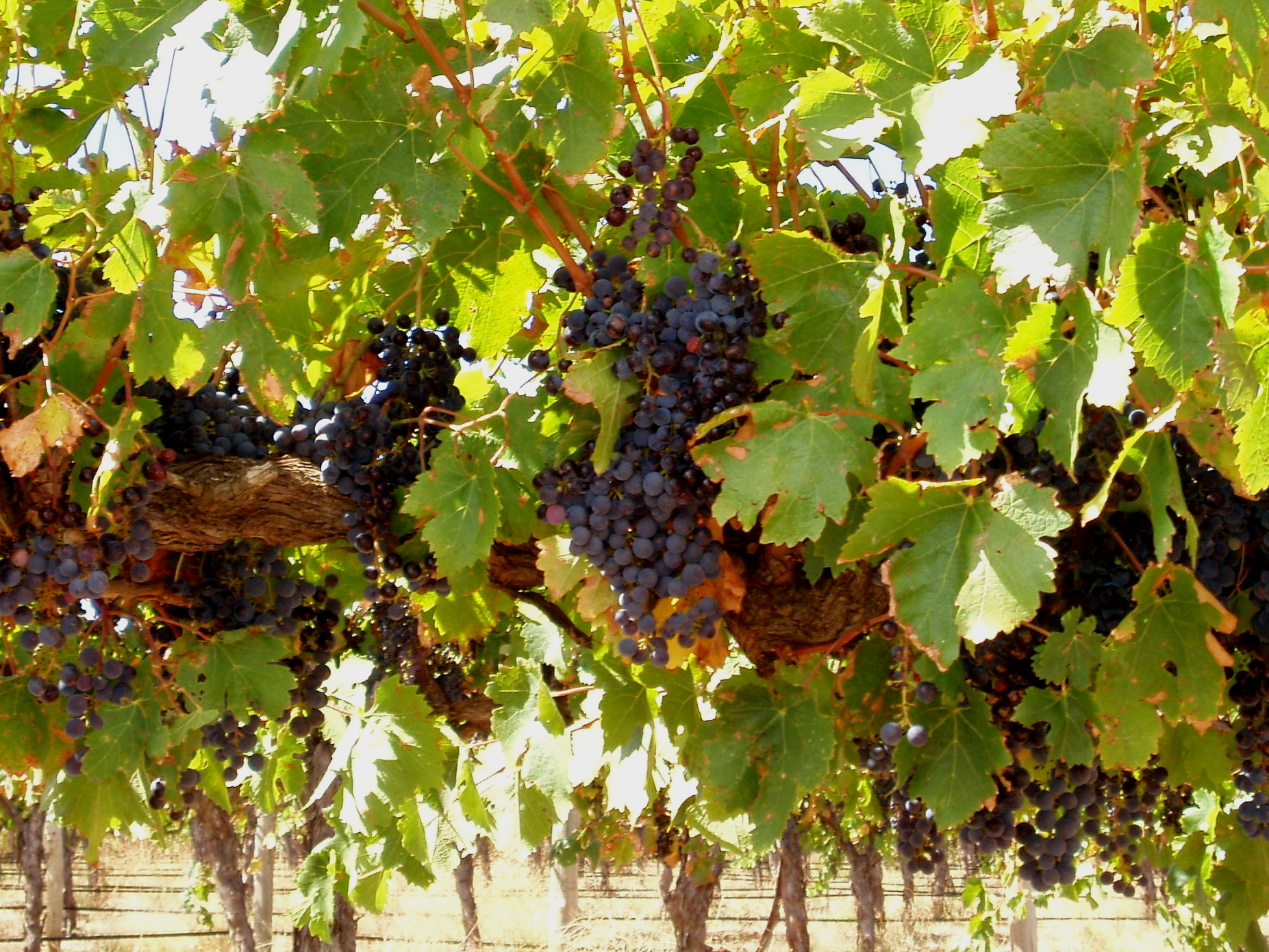
Red wine grapes growing in the Barossa Valley, 2009

Alcohol is the most widely consumed drug in Australia and is frequently available at social and cultural activities. On a per capita scale, 10.3 litres of pure alcohol were consumed by each Australian in 2010. The average amongst OECD countries was 9.1 litres. Beer was the most preferred beverage, followed by wine, spirits and pre-mixed beverages. Retail sales for alcohol including GST in the 2011/12 financial year totalled A$18.135 billion. In 2012, XXXX Gold was Australia's top-selling as measured by the volume of sales.

In 2010, the National Drug Strategy Household Survey found that 7.2% of the Australian population drank alcohol each day. Males were found to drink on daily basis at twice the rate of females and were more likely to drink quantities which posed a health risk. One recent survey of teenagers in Australia has shown a decrease in binge drinking across the age group since 2005. Another survey in Victoria revealed drinking rates were increasing for young people despite it being illegal. In 2010, 18- to 29-year-olds were the age group most likely to drink at harmful levels.

There are numerous factors that contribute to the rate of alcohol consumption in rural Australia. Studies have found a variety of economic and social factors result in a higher rate of alcohol consumption. Economically, factors such as lower income, level of education, lack of infrastructure, and a higher availability of alcohol are all known to affect alcohol consumption rates. Social factors also play a large role with the normality and social acceptability of alcohol consumption in rural areas often leading to drinking beginning at a much younger age. Gender has also been found to play a large role in rural communities, with a sense of masculinity seen to heavily influence people.

== Drinking age ==
In Australia, 18 is the legal age at which someone may purchase alcohol. Liquor outlets across Western Australia are required to request identification from those who look under 25 years of age when purchasing alcohol. Police cadets, most of whom are around 24 years of age, are often used to research retailers who would sell them alcohol. In 2013, 72 out of 100 cadets were able to purchase alcohol without showing identification in the Perth metropolitan area. The National Health and Medical Research Council issues guidelines for alcohol use in Australia.

State/territory	Current legal drinking age	Year adopted	Previous legal drinking age
Australian Capital Territory	18	1928	Not amended
New South Wales	18	1905	Not amended
Northern Territory	18	1929	Not amended
Queensland	18	1974	21
South Australia	18	1971	20 in 1968
Tasmania	18	1974	20 in 1967
Victoria	18	1906	Not amended
Western Australia	18	1970	21

== Society and culture ==
Alcohol plays an integral part of Australian culture. Alcohol plays a role in celebrations, a variety of social activities, relaxation, as a generator of tax revenue and as a major source of employment and exports.

A common cultural staple amongst young people is to drink, specifically, to get drunk. Almost two-thirds of 18- to 29-year-olds agreed with this statement, and one in five hospitalisations of people under 25 was alcohol related. 88% of Australians surveyed in 2010 had consumed alcohol by age 14. Of Australians who do drink often, the majority seem to do so in moderation. 72.6% of those surveyed consume alcohol below levels for long term risk of harm. However, many Australians consume alcohol at harmful levels. There are more than 42 million incidents of binge drinking each year. Each month 20.4% of Australians consume alcohol at high risk levels. Australians living in remote areas are more likely to drink at high risk levels compared to those living in urban areas.

The driving forces behind Australia's drinking culture are derived from social customs, habits, publicised images and normality. These factors can be enhanced by influences related to the social, physical and economic availability of alcohol. This is driven by marketing and promotion, cost, accessibility and age restrictions. There is no single factor attributed to why people drink at these harmful levels, however lack of nutrition, poor exercise, smoking, damaging health behaviours, illicit drug use and excessive drinking all appear to contribute to a complicated structure of social determinants.

Many Australians feel the need to consume large amounts of alcohol before going to public venues to socialise and continue drinking. This is commonly known as "pre-drinking". This is largely due to the views many have of the elevated cost of alcohol purchased at venues. The dangerous levels of intoxication being widely accepted in Australia points to a problem with alcohol consumption. Social networking has also been studied as having undergone negative effects when combined with overconsumption of alcohol.

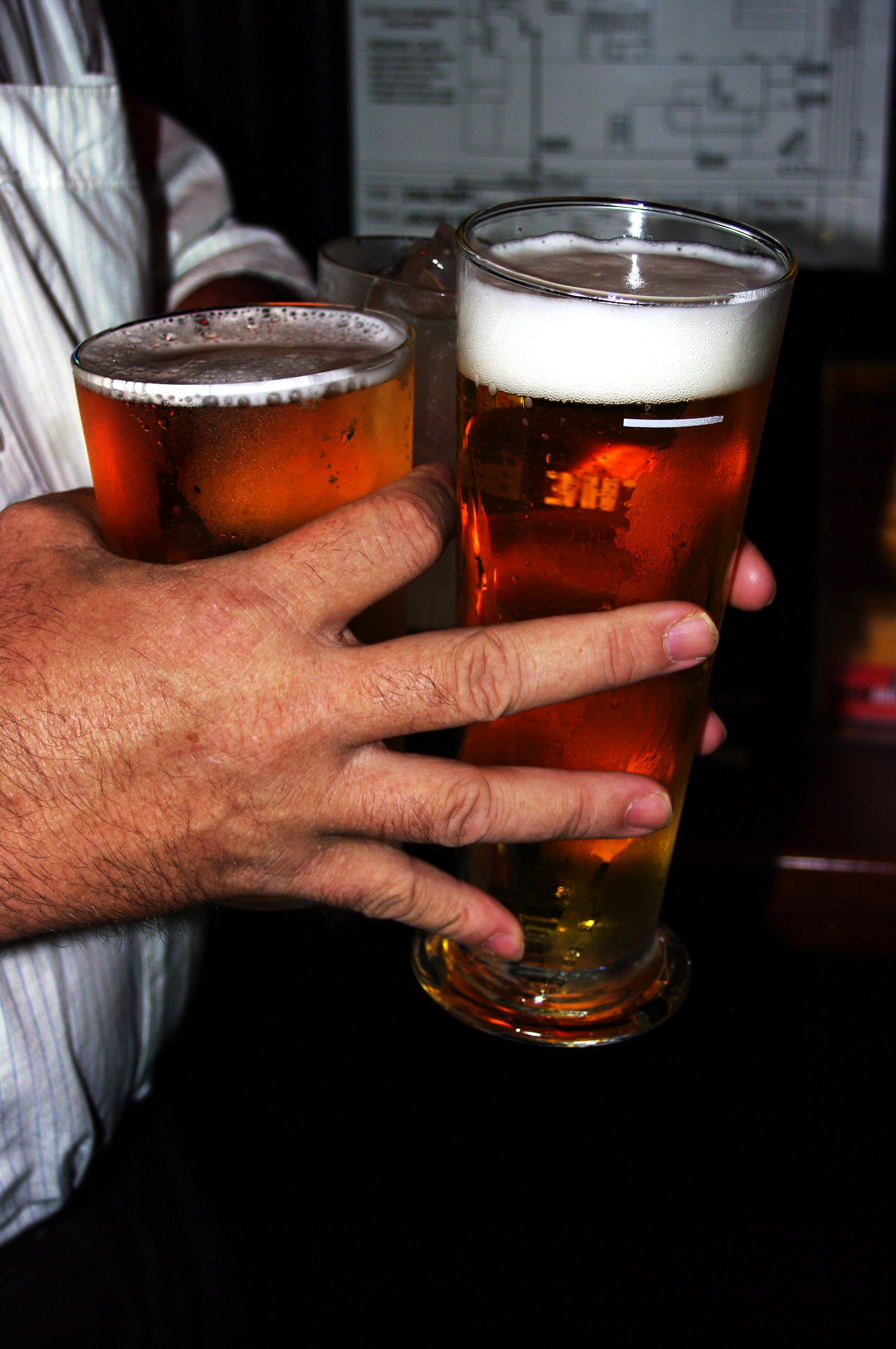
"Rounds" or "shouting" are a common norm of drinking etiquette.

=== Etiquette ===
What mostly attracts Australians to drinking is the taste of the beverages as well as general social acceptance. Social norms have been created as a result of communal drinking. When everyone has finished their drink, one member of the group is expected to purchase the next "round" of drinks until all members of the party have paid one turn. "Shouting" refers to paying for someone else's drink as a good gesture with no expectation of one in return. This can give people the feeling of being more socially accepted.

== Influences ==
=== Peer pressure ===
A lot of pressure can be placed on someone who feels that there is a social expectation to consume alcohol. It is more often than not referred to as being "un-Australian" to turn down an alcoholic drink. This places a considerable amount of pressure on young people in particular. Learning how to drink is often thought of as an integral part of growing into adulthood. This peer pressure maintains the social norm, and wider acceptance of the drug.

=== Social occasions ===
In many social situations alcohol is more than likely available. It is expected that alcohol be available at numerous social events including household parties, pubs, clubs, sporting events, during meals, celebrations and even funerals.

=== Social status ===
A lot of people think drinking alcohol gives them a sense of identity that may help them fit in with social networks. Some also believe it heightens confidence to take part in social situations. Some may oppose the fact that they are being pressured into consuming alcohol, but others look to find social networks where consuming alcohol is common as enhancing a sense of belonging and identity formation.

=== Family ===
Children's first reference for alcohol can be traced to their parents habits. 62% of underage Australians said they got access to their alcohol from friends or others, while 44% said their own parents purchased their alcohol. Nearly one in ten managed to purchase alcohol themselves.

=== Marketing ===
Marketing campaigns have heavily influenced the change in the type of alcohol consumed extensively by young people. Premixed spirits are the focus of many advertisements, rather than beer or wine. The alcohol content in these premixed drinks are of concern as they hold higher alcohol percentages than the same amount of beer. Many young people prefer these drinks because they are often sweet and disguise the amount of alcohol they contain.

== Binge drinking ==
Alcohol is a major contributing cause of violence in Australia. In 2006, more than three-quarters of a million Australians were abused by persons under the influence of alcohol, including 33,147 cases in NSW.

=== Young people ===
According to the National Binge Drinking Campaign on Young Australians and Alcohol, more than 20% of 14- to 19-year-olds consume alcohol on a weekly basis. In 2005, the Australian School Students' Alcohol and Drug Survey found that 10% of 12-year-olds had consumed alcohol in the week prior to the survey, and amongst 17 years old, this increased to 49%.

According to the 2007 National Drug Strategy Household Survey (NDSHS), 82.9% of Australians aged 14 and over had consumed alcohol in the previous 12 months, with only 10.1% having never consumed at least 1 standard drink of alcohol. The survey also found that 20.4% of Australians (23.7% of males and 17.2% of females) consumed alcohol at risky or high risk levels according to the 2001 Australian guideline for Alcohol intake. In March 2008, Prime Minister Kevin Rudd announced the allocation of $53 million in funding to target what he described as a "Binge-Drinking Epidemic" among young adults in Australia. Among teenagers who drink weekly, 29% of males aged 12–17 had consumed seven or more drinks on one occasion; and 32% of females in the same age group had consumed five or more drinks at the same time.

Approximately 40% of 14- to 19-year-olds drink at levels that risk harm in the short term, like accidental injuries.

== Indigenous alcohol consumption ==
Statistics show that the rate of binge drinking in rural areas is 5% higher for Indigenous Australians when compared to the non-indigenous, and it was also found that Indigenous Australians were twice as likely to consume alcohol dangerously in the short term at least once a week. Australian Institute of Health and Welfare found that the rate of alcohol abstention for both male and female Indigenous Australians was much higher than non-indigenous Australians, sitting at 1.7 and 1.4 times more respectively. While the rate of alcohol abstention is high, the rate of both short- and long-term risky drinking in Indigenous Australians causes some concern.

Historically, Indigenous Australians produced and consumed alcoholic drinks made from native ingredients. In Tasmania, the sap of the Eucalyptus gunnii tree (known also as the cider gum) was collected and fermented with natural yeasts to create an alcoholic drink called way-a-linah. In Western Australia, a mead-like drink called mangaitj was made from fermenting the cones of the banksia, and other native alcoholic drinks are known to have been produced in the Northern Territory and in parts of the Torres Strait.

Indigenous Australians were prohibited from buying alcohol until the end of the 1960s. The repeal of this legislation saw a rapid increase in Indigenous alcohol consumption and contributed to many of the problems faced by Indigenous Australians today. In recent years, efforts have been made to try to curb Indigenous drinking, with the Queensland government, in association with rural Indigenous communities, setting up Alcohol Management Plans (AMPs). AMPs were first introduced in Australia in 2002, and have been adopted throughout a number of states. More recently, AMPs have been introduced into 19 communities in rural Queensland to attempt to control alcohol-fuelled violence. The plans either restrict the type and amount of alcohol that can be purchased in a town, or involve a blanket ban on alcohol sales.

== Marketing ==
In 2007, it was reported that $128 million was spent on alcohol advertising in Australia.

The Australian Medical Association claims young people in Australia are being exposed to an unprecedented level of alcohol marketing. While there are no alcohol advertising bans in Australia some restrictions and conditions apply. There are no restrictions on the sponsorship of youth and sport events in Australia.

== Legislation and guidelines ==
The age limit for the purchase of alcoholic products in Australia is 18. A license to both produce and sell alcohol is required. Alcohol products in Australia contain warnings against drinking whilst pregnant.

Guidelines for alcohol use are made by the National Health and Medical Research Council. The guidelines recommend no more than ten standard drinks per week and no more than four standard drinks per day for adults to reduce the risk of harm from alcohol-related disease or injury. Opinions of the latest guidelines for adults are mixed, with people often indicating the recommendation was either too restrictive or did not go far enough, with some stating the new guidelines strike a good balance. Guidelines for under 18's and those pregnant or breastfeeding recommend not consuming any alcohol.

Guidelines for health professionals are also published, providing information on treatments for alcohol problems, and last updated in 2021. The guidelines highlight a range of treatment and management options for health professionals to consider when providing people with treatment alcohol problems, including brief interventions, alcohol withdrawal, psycho-social interventions, pharmacotherapies for alcohol treatment, and related comorbidities. The guidelines also note the importance of addressing stigma associated with alcohol use and addiction to improve health outcomes.

Queensland has introduced alcohol restrictions as part of the state's Alcohol Management Plans in 19 separate Indigenous communities.

== Violence and harm ==
Alcohol use disorder in Australia is associated with violence, drink driving, child neglect and abuse as well as absenteeism in the workplace. Alcohol is second to tobacco as the cause of preventable death and hospitalisation in Australia. According to a report released by VicHealth and the Foundation for Alcohol Research and Education in 2014, an average of 15 Australians die each day due to alcohol, an increase of 62% within a decade. One recent estimate of the total cost of alcohol-related crime put the figure at $1.7 billion.

A broad range of negative effects come with excessive alcohol consumption. Some of these include an increase in road and other accidents, crime, public and domestic violence, brain damage, liver disease, and the breakdown of social networks. Alcohol related police detentions account for approximately 39% of all crimes. Alcohol consumption relates to one in eight deaths of Australians under the age of 25. In 2013 five million Australians aged 14 or over (26%) reported being victim to an alcohol related incident.

According to the 2010 National Drug Strategy Household Survey just over 8% of Australian adults reported being the victim of an alcohol-related assault. Between 2004 and 2008, Indigenous Australians died from disorders due to alcohol at a rate seven times greater than non-Indigenous Australians. Estimates obtained from police data show 70,000 Australians were the victim of an alcohol-related assault in 2005. Research has indicated about 10% of police time is devoted to dealing with incidents related to alcohol.

In an effort to reduce alcohol intoxication by teenagers during schoolies week liquor retailers have had to hire extra security staff at popular schoolies locations. Parents supplying alcohol to minors in an unsupervised environment may incur penalties of up to $8,800 in Queensland.

== Solutions to binge drinking ==
There are many initiatives, mainly funded by the federal government, to help resolve the binge drinking crisis.

Drinkwise is a non-profit organisation founded by the alcohol industry in 2005. Dozens of scientists have vowed not to accept their funding as they lack transparency and independence stating in a joint media release Drinkwise "promotes ineffective interventions rather than measures known to be effective that reduce industry profits".

Its main focus claims to be help bring about a healthier and safer drinking culture in Australia. Drink Wise provides information for managing teen drinking, binge drinking, drink driving, effects of alcohol on pregnancy and for school leavers. It fights against evidence based policies such as raising the tax on alcohol.

Tackling Binge Drinking is a government program supported by the AFL, which promotes a healthy alcohol culture and addresses the risks of alcohol use in adolescence, mainly surrounding sport.

DrugInfo is a website run by the Australian Drug Foundation to raise awareness of harms related to using drugs, including alcohol.

== Public drunkenness ==
Victoria and Queensland are the only states that still have a specific offence of public drunkenness, a charge that a royal commission found disproportionately affected Aboriginal people. In the other states and territories, a person must also be behaving in a disorderly or offensive manner to be charged with an offence. On 22 August 2019, Victoria announced plans to decriminalise public drunkenness and to treat alcohol use disorder as a health issue.

In Victoria being "drunk in a public place" and "drunk and disorderly in a public place" are separate offences contained in the Summary Offences Act 1966 which have their own power of arrest. Recent changes to legislation allow police to issue an infringement notice for these offences in addition to the traditional method of charging and bailing the offender to the Magistrates' Court. The current fine attached to the infringement notice is $590 for a first offence and $1,100 for a subsequent offence. A person arrested for being drunk or drunk and disorderly is held at the Melbourne Custody Centre or the cells at a police station or placed in the care of a friend or relative.

Public drunkenness was decriminalised in New South Wales (1979), and the Northern Territory, and in South Australia (1984). In New South Wales police have the discretion to issue "on the spot" fines or infringement notices for "drunk in public", a fine that costs the individual over $480 (4 penalty units). Community Legal Centres across the state complain about these fines and the impact it has had on various vulnerable members of the community, including young people, the homeless and minority groups. As an example, a "drunk and disorderly" fine in New South Wales starts at $550. As of February 2009, local councils in New South Wales are not allowed to charge people who drink in alcohol-free zones; they are only permitted to confiscate the alcohol of the intoxicated person.

== Alcohol-related organisations ==
The Australian Hotels Association represents hoteliers around Australia. It was established in 1839. The Brewers Association of Australia and New Zealand was set up to advocate on behalf of brewers in both countries. and the Independent Brewers Association.

Drinkwise is an industry funded organisation that funds alcohol-related research and conducts public education activities. Ocsober is an Australian fundraising initiative that encourages people to give up alcohol for the month of October.

== See also ==
- Australian pub
- Australian whisky
- Australian wine
- Drinking culture
- Legal drinking age
- List of countries by alcohol consumption per capita
- Temperance movement in Australia
- Six o'clock swill
