= Drinkwise =

Australian social change organization

DrinkWise Australia is an organisation that employs social marketing strategies and develops educational initiatives aimed at addressing issues related to drinking culture and underage drinking. The organisation's approach is to provide information and resources to the community, emphasising responsible alcohol consumption. It operates based on a framework that encourages collaboration between the alcohol industry and community entities.

DrinkWise's philosophy is founded on industry leadership and community partnerships. It is currently funded by voluntary contributions from alcohol industry participants and has in the past received both Coalition and Labor Government funding to support its work.

The organisation is governed by a board of Australians with diverse professional backgrounds including policing, public health, education, community service, academia, research and marketing. DrinkWise's alcohol industry contributors are also represented on its board.

== History ==
DrinkWise Australia was established in 2005 and then received $5 million in funding from the Federal Government as announced by the Parliamentary Secretary to the Minister for Health and Ageing in the then Australian Government, the Hon Christopher Pyne MP.

=== Board Members ===
Under the DrinkWise constitution, the board must comprise eight (8) community members and six (6) industry representatives with the chair being a community member. Current board members as of December 2023 are:

Community directors:

- Neil Comrie AO, APM – Chair
- Kate Ellis
- Niki Ellis OAM
- Rob Knowles AO
- Paul Sheahan AM
- Terry Slater AM
- Amanda Vanstone
- Professor Judith Whitworth AC

Industry directors:

- Peter Hurley AO
- Amanda Sellers
- Eveline Albarracin
- Anubha Sahasrabuddhe
- Helen Strachan
- Michael Waters

== Activities ==
=== Campaigns ===
To date, DrinkWise Australia has launched a range of social marketing campaigns and initiatives including Kids Absorb Your Drinking, Kids and Alcohol Don’t Mix, Drinking – Do it Properly and "You won't Miss a Moment...if you DrinkWise".

==== Kids Absorb Your Drinking ====
Launched in June 2008, the Kids Absorb Your Drinking campaign was created to raise awareness of the importance of role-modeling behaviour of parents about their consumption of alcohol. In a 2008 media release, DrinkWise cites research that supports the view that there is a strong positive correlation between the way parents drink and how their children grow up to drink.

==== Kids and Alcohol Don’t Mix ====
In 2010 the Kids and Alcohol Don't Mix campaign informed parents on emerging clinical research undertaken by Professor Ian Hickie at the Sydney University Mind and Brain Institute that indicated that alcohol can cause damage to the developing adolescent brain.

==== Drinking – Do it Properly (18–24 year-old Campaign) ====
In 2014, DrinkWise Australia launched an Australian first campaign designed to influence young adults (18–24 years) to moderate the intensity and frequency of binge drinking occasions. The campaign was developed in response to the prevalence of poor drinking choices by young Australians aged 18–24 years. DrinkWise commissioned quantitative and qualitative formative research as well as multiple rounds of concept testing research to ensure the campaign cut through with young adults.

==== Never Have I Ever ====
In 2025, DrinkWise launched the Never Have I Ever campaign, a national education initiative targeting young Australians—particularly women aged 18–24—to address the relationship between stress, anxiety, and alcohol consumption. The campaign was developed in response to DrinkWise-commissioned research finding that nearly three-quarters (72%) of young women in that age group experienced stress often or all of the time, and that almost half (47%) of young women drinking at risky levels reported using alcohol to cope with stress.

The campaign featured dual Olympic gold medallist Shayna Jack and was supported by medical expert Dr Andrew Rochford as a DrinkWise ambassador. Support services listed as campaign partners included ReachOut, a youth mental health service.

=== Commissioned research ===
Where a knowledge gap has existed, DrinkWise Australia has commissioned independent academic research:

- From Ideal to Reality: Cultural contradictions and young people’s drinking: The first stage of this project resulted in a literature review that collected a range of data that addressed the topic and was published in 2008. This report is the result of qualitative research undertaken by NCETA that examined the socio-cultural influences on 14 to 24-year-old Australians' drinking and the analysis provides useful insights to better understand these influences.
- Drinking patterns in Australia, 2001-2007: The Report is based on an analysis of data from 2001, 2004 and 2007 National Drug Strategy Household Surveys, and looks at trends in alcohol consumption, alcohol-related harm, alcohol beverage of choice, under-age drinking and factors associated with risky drinking populations.
- The influence of parents and siblings on children’s and adolescents’ alcohol use: a critical review of the literature: A consortium consisting of Monash, Newcastle and La Trobe Universities undertook this review to document and critique the existing evidence (available up to 2009) concerning the role of parents and older sibling's behaviours, attitudes and use of alcohol in influencing their children's/siblings’ attitudes, behaviour and use of alcohol, within the broader social environment.
- Alcohol and the Teenage Brain: Safest to keep them apart: Professor Ian Hickie, executive director of the Brain and Mind Research Institute at the University of Sydney reviewed the evidence regarding alcohol and the teenage brain and identified that alcohol can disrupt the brain development during the critical phase of growth that occurs from around 12–13 years of age until our early twenties.
- What a Great Night’; The Cultural Drivers and Drinking Practices among 14-24-year-old Australians: A consortium consisting of Monash and Deakin Universities undertook this research project to identify the most salient cultural drivers of low risk and risky alcohol consumption by Victorian youth, located in inner and outer suburban settings plus provincial and rural locations in Victoria.
- Expressions of Drunkenness (400 Rabbits): This book is the 10th in a scholarly series on alcohol in society published by the International Center for Alcohol Policies (ICAP) and provides an understanding of the historical origins of drunkenness; the biological explanations of intoxication; the language used to define this phenomenon; and modern-day drinking patterns.
- Sustaining a Reduction of Alcohol-Related Harms in the Licensed Environment: A Practical Experiment to Generate New Evidence: This project was undertaken to develop a comprehensive prevention model that was capable of reducing alcohol-related violence and aggression, and a scientifically defensible research design to test the model in a variety of licensed environments in Australia and New Zealand.

== Criticism ==
Some health and academic commentators have noted that DrinkWise is the Australian version of the global alcohol industry-supported public relations organisations, following the example of the tobacco industry. In 2009 fifty-eight scientists and health professionals expressed their opposition to DrinkWise by signing a letter stating that they will not seek or accept funding from them, and called on other researchers and community agencies to consider their own positions. These researchers strongly oppose the perceived conflict of interest between a body that is linked to an industry that profits from the consumption of alcohol, and that also purports to funds research aimed at reducing alcohol-related harm.

In 2018 thousands of posters warning pregnant women about the dangers of alcohol have had to be removed from the walls of hospitals and GP clinics around Australia because they contained misleading and inaccurate information about the risks of drinking alcohol while pregnant. The posters were distributed by Tonic Health Media and were later replaced with updated posters.

== See also ==
- Alcohol in Australia
- Dry July
- Ocsober
