= Dry July =

Taking a break from alcoholic beverages

Dry July Foundation is an Australian not-for-profit organization founded in 2008 that runs an annual campaign called "Dry July" that challenges people to abstain from drinking alcohol throughout July to raise funds for cancer support organizations. As of 2024, the Dry July Foundation claims to have raised more than $90 million for people affected by cancer.

In 2012, Dry July expanded to New Zealand.

== The campaign ==
Participants of Dry July are encouraged to abstain from drinking alcohol during the month of July and solicit donations to the Foundation from their friends and family. Participants nominate a cancer service where they want the donations to go. The campaign also offers "Golden Tickets" costing a minimum of $25, should a participant want a 'night off' from abstaining.

In order to become a Dry July beneficiary, cancer support organizations must apply to the Foundation and meet the Dry July beneficiary guidelines.

Starting in 2014, the Dry July Foundation began offering participants the choice to support the Foundation's grant program for cancer support organizations in Western Australia. The grant program was expanded in 2015 to encompass other states in Australia as well as in New Zealand.

== History ==
In 2008, Phil Grove, Brett Macdonald and Kenny McGilvary pledged to give up alcohol for a month to raise some money for their local hospital. After the challenge was picked up by 702 ABC Sydney's Adam Spencer, over 1,000 people signed up to Dry July, raising over $250,000.

In 2009, Dry July supported six cancer services around Australia. With 4,000 participants, the organization raised over $1.3 million.

In 2010, 9,000 people signed up to Dry July, raising $2.4million+ for 10 cancer services across Australia (with each Australian state and territory represented).

In 2011, Dry July had 11,500+ participants sign up and raise over $2.8 million for 13 cancer services.

Dry July expanded internationally in 2012, with the first Dry July New Zealand taking place. Over 2,000 New Zealanders signed up and raised NZD$550,000+. In Australia, Dry July added an additional 7 cancer services to its beneficiary list, and raised over $3.7 million from its 15,000+ participants.

In 2013, Dry July in Australia had over 18,000 participants raise $4.3 million for their 31 beneficiaries. For the second Dry July New Zealand, over 4,000 people participated and raised over $765,000 for three beneficiaries: Auckland City Hospital, Wellington Hospital and Christchurch Hospital.

2014 saw Dry July raise $3.8 million for 37 cancer services across Australia, with 19,600+ participants signed up for the challenge.

In 2015, Dry July had 21,400 participants sign up and raise $4.1 million for 42 cancer support organizations in Australia.

== Cautions ==
For participants with a dependency on alcohol, dry months may lead to symptoms of alcohol withdrawal syndrome if they start out abstaining completely. For such people, experts advise consultation with a health professional before participating in this exercise.

== See also ==
- Alcohol in Australia
- Drinkwise
- Dry January
- Ocsober
