= Dirk Helbing =

Complex-systems scientist

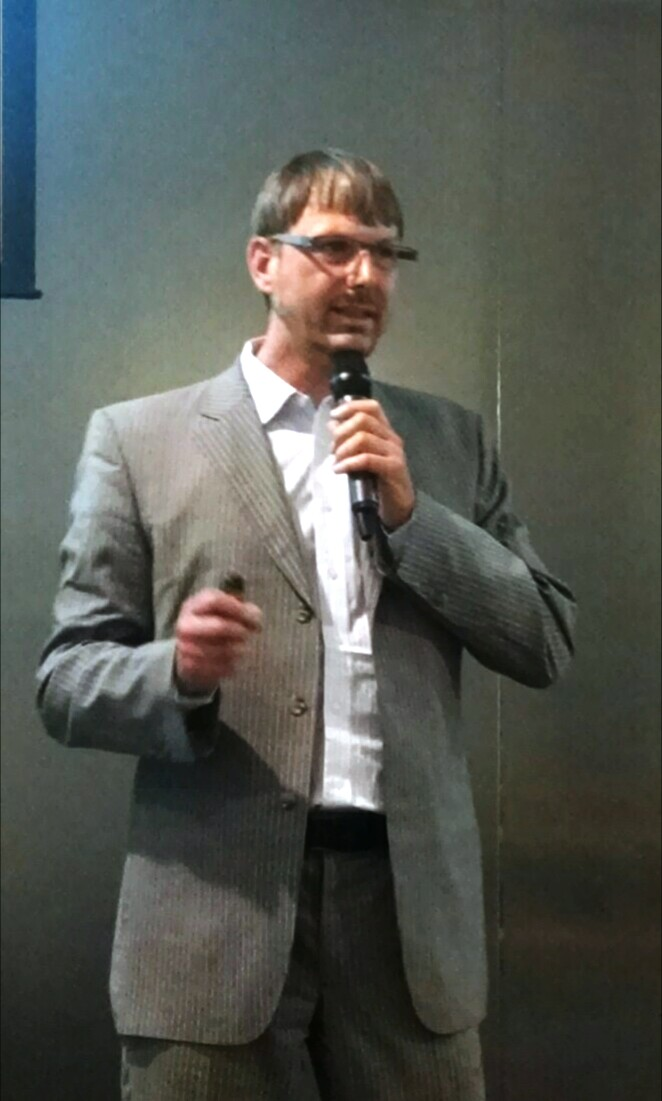
- Born: January 19, 1965 (age 61); Aalen, Germany
- Education: University of Göttingen (1984-1990)
- Known for: Social force model, crowd simulation, traffic simulation, pedestrian microsimulation, complex systems, computational social science, collective intelligence, digital democracy, digital ethics
- Awards: Golden Idea Award 2012
- Scientific career
- Fields: Complex systems, computational social science
- Workplaces: ETH Zurich (2007–) TU Delft (2015ff) University of Oxford (2010) (host: Peter Hedström) Harvard University (2010) (hosts: Martin Nowak, Nicholas A. Christakis) INRETS (2004) (host: Patrick Lebacque) TU Dresden (2000-2007) Collegium Budapest, Hungary (2000) Tel Aviv University (1999) (hosts: Isaac Goldhirsch, Eshel Ben-Jacob) Eötvös Loránd University (1998) (host: Tamás Vicsek) Xerox PARC (1998) (host: Bernardo Huberman) Weizmann Institute of Science (1997) (host: David Mukamel) University of Stuttgart (1990-2000)
- Doctoral advisor: Wolfgang Weidlich
- Other academic advisors: Manfred R. Schroeder

Dirk Helbing (born January 19, 1965) is Professor of Computational Social Science at the Department of Humanities, Social and Political Sciences of ETH Zurich and affiliate of its Computer Science Department.

== Biography ==
Dirk Helbing studied physics and mathematics at the University of Göttingen. He completed his doctoral thesis in 1992 at Stuttgart University, on modeling social processes by means of game-theoretical approaches, stochastic methods, and complex systems theory. In 1996, he earned an additional "habilitation" degree, related to his studies of traffic dynamics and optimization.

In 2000, he became full professor and Managing Director of the Institute for Transport and Economics at Dresden University of Technology. Helbing was elected as a member of the German Academy of Sciences Leopoldina in 2008 and of the World Academy of Art and Science in 2016. In January 2014 Prof. Helbing received an honorary PhD from Delft University of Technology (TU Delft). Since June 2015 he was affiliate professor at the faculty of Technology, Policy and Management at TU Delft for some years, where he led the PhD school in "Engineering Social Technologies for a Responsible Digital Future".

== Research activities ==
Dirk Helbing started out as a physicist. His diploma thesis focussed on modeling and simulating pedestrians and crowds. During his PhD and habilitation in physics, he helped to establish the fields of socio-, econo- and traffic physics. He was also co-founder of the Physics of Socio-Economic Systems Division of the German Physical Society (DPG). As a visiting scientist at Tel Aviv University and the Weizmann Institute in Israel, the Eötvös University in Budapest, and Xerox PARC in California, he focused on a broad variety of complex systems - including the self-organisation of pedestrians, traffic jams, bacterial patterns, and Mexican waves. At Dresden University of Technology he became the Managing Director of the Institute of Transport & Economics, worked on traffic assistant systems (i.e. early self-driving cars) and a self-organized traffic light control system, which was patented. He found that crowd disasters are often caused by a phenomenon called "crowd turbulence" and worked on ways to describe, reduce and respond to such disasters. As professor of Sociology at ETH Zurich, he worked on evolutionary game theory and agent-based computer simulations of social processes and phenomena.

The work of Prof. Helbing has been widely cited in the media and academia. He has written more than 10 papers in Nature, Science and PNAS. In 2012, he won the Idee Suisse Award. He co-founded the Competence Center for Coping with Crises in Complex Socio-Economic Systems, the Risk Center, the Institute for Science, Technology and Policy (ISTP) and the Decision Science Laboratory (DeSciL). While coordinating the FuturICT initiative, he helped to further develop disciplines such as data science, computational social science, and global systems science. This work resulted in the establishment of the "Nervousnet" Platform, a smartphone app enabling users to share data to be used to achieve scientific and social goals and lay the groundwork for digital democracy. For a short time, Helbing also worked for the World Economic Forum's Global Agenda Council on Complex Systems. He was elected member of the External Faculty of the Santa Fe Institute and now belongs to the External Faculty of the Complexity Science Hub Vienna. He was on the Boards of the Global Brain Institute in Brussels and the International Centre for Earth Simulation in Geneva. He is also involved in the activities of "Staatslabor" (a Swiss government science initiative) as well as the establishment of the Blockchain [X] initiative and the Blockchain Lab in Delft. He was a member of a Swiss governmental advisory group on the societal impact of digitization and was lead author of a "Digital Manifesto" on how to safeguard democratic values in the digital age. Prof. Helbing was an adviser to the Citizen Science Center Zurich and is an advocate for a Charter of Digital Human Rights.

Dirk Helbing is known for the social force model, in particular its application to self-organising phenomena in pedestrian crowds. Besides the slower-is-faster effect, he introduced the freezing-by-heating effect and the phase diagram of congested traffic states. Helbing also proposed a microscopic foundation of evolutionary game theory and has studied self-organized behavioral conventions. His work has applied the principles of collective intelligence and self-organized control to the optimization of urban and freeway traffic. He has conducted research on norms and conflict, and the role of success-driven motion for the establishment of cooperation among selfish individuals, socio-inspired technology and techno-social systems, disasters and crisis management.

=== Living Earth Simulator ===
Helbing was the Principal Investigator on a project named FuturICT Knowledge Accelerator and Crisis Relief System, a computing system working on big datasets, conceived as sort of a crystal ball of the world. The core of the system is the Living Earth Simulator, a computing machine attempting "to model global-scale systems — economies, governments, cultural trends, epidemics, agriculture, technological developments, and more — using torrential data streams, sophisticated algorithms, and as much hardware as it takes". However, the project lost in the final round of the application for funding from the European Commission of €1 billion. Despite this, the ideas developed by the group have influenced international research programs. Since 2017, the FuturICT 2.0 project was funded by the European Commission's FLAG-ERA program. It had a focus on digital democracy and a socio-ecological finance system ("finance 4.0", "fin4+"), combining Internet of Things with blockchain technology.

=== Noteworthy projects and presentations by Dirk Helbing's research teams in Dresden, Zurich and Delft ===
- Derivation of the replicator equation in evolutionary game theory and self-organization of behavioral conventions from behavioral imitation.
- Creation of an electronic traffic assistance system to reduce traffic jams on freeways (an early algorithm for self-driving cars).
- Invention of a patented self-organized traffic light control system for cities.
- Semiconductor logistic project with Infineon Technologies increasing throughput by 30%.
- Development of the "social force model", frequently used for pedestrian and crowd simulation.
- Establishment of an expert team to improve the safety of pilgrimages.
- Data-based agent-based simulation study of the Middle Eastern conflict in Jerusalem.
- Publication "How to save human lives: What complexity science and information systems can contribute".
- Patent: "Interaction Support Processor" - Ethically aligned design for information systems.
- Nervousnet App - the Internet of Things as a Citizen Web (in development).
- Grippenet App for anonymous cooperative health monitoring (in development).
- Speech at the Out of the Box Conference with World Thinkers and the Dalai Lama on May 16, 2012.
- Declaration of "Digital Democracy" at the Falling Walls Conference in Berlin on November 9, 2015.
- Talk at the "Build Peace" Conference in Zurich on September 11, 2016: "A New Paradigm for World Peace Is Possible".
- BIOTS - Blockchain and Internet of Things School at ETH Zurich, founded in 2016.
- Co-founded Zurich Hub for Ethics and Technology in (2016).
- Article in Nature, "Sustainable development: Turn war rooms into peace rooms", Dirk Helbing and Peter Seele, September 28, 2017.
- Interview at "Petersberger Gespräche" 2017 (Bonn, German) on September 16, 2017: "Artificial Intelligence - from feasibility and superintelligence to planning and envisioning the future".

== Controversies ==
=== Allegations of inappropriate presentation content ===
In February 2022, during a lecture Professor Dirk Helbing presented a slide that some students from ETH Zurich considered inappropriate and insensitive to the Chinese community. The students raised their concerns both to Professor Helbing and the ETH Zurich Ombudsman and Respect Advice Center, the latter of which provides services related to inappropriate behaviours, discrimination, bullying or allegations at the Institute. A group of Chinese students also wrote open letters to ETH Zurich to address this issue.

=== Social-media response ===
The allegations by the students have sparked widespread discussion on LinkedIn with comments from students and researchers around the globe. In addition, it was reported that Professor Dirk Helbing received death threats.

=== Investigation and closure ===
Following an investigation and discussion with the ETH Zurich Ombudsman and Respect Advice center, Professor Dirk Helbing presented an apology statement on Twitter and LinkedIn Accounts. The ETH Zurich Twitter account also mentioned the apology from Professor Dirk Helbing.
