= Dry January =

Abstention from alcohol during January

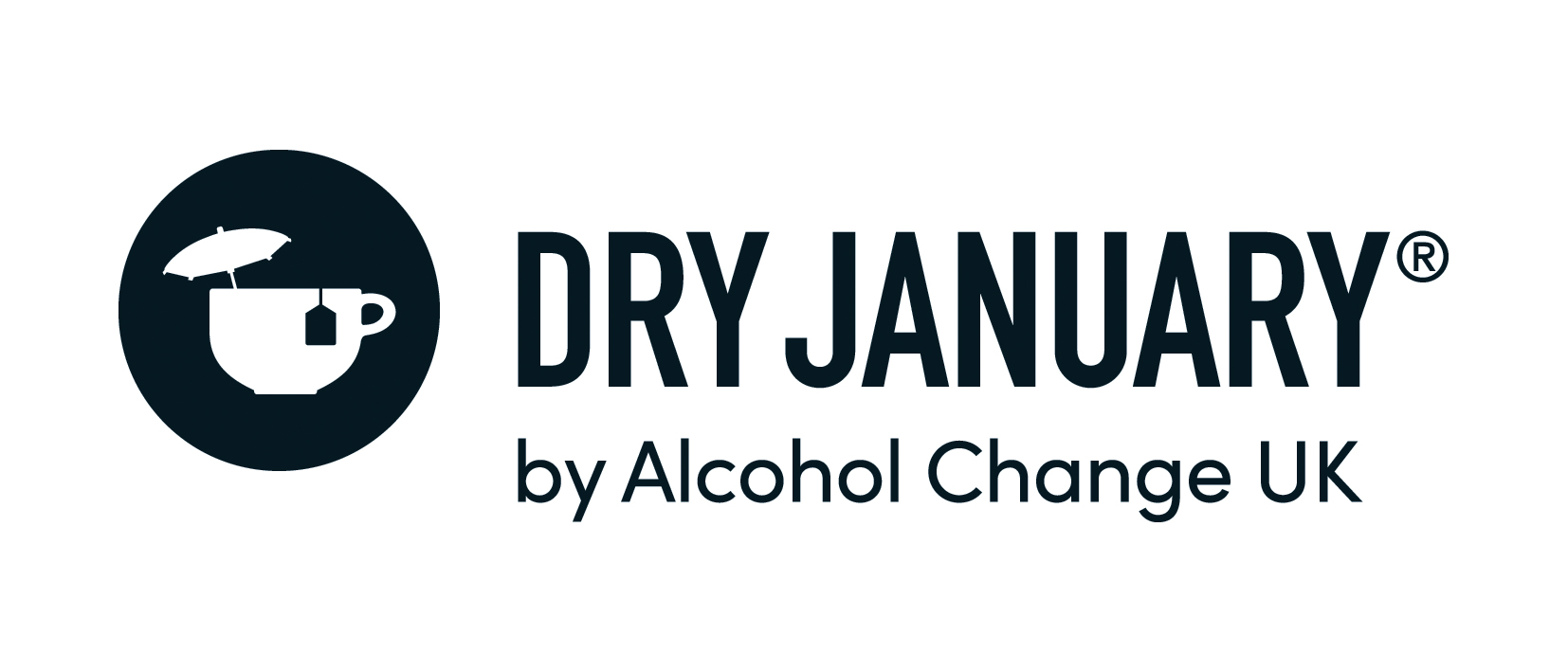
Logo

The Dry January challenge is a campaign developed and delivered by UK charity Alcohol Change UK where people sign up to abstain from alcohol for the month of January. The term "Dry January" is a registered trademark with Alcohol Change UK and was first registered in 2014.

Although "Dry January" had started to enter the vernacular by at least 2006, the campaign was first formalized in 2013 by Alcohol Change UK, then operating under the name Alcohol Concern. Emily Robinson started an international Dry January campaign when she joined Alcohol Concern in 2012, after giving up alcohol in January 2011 to prepare for a half marathon she noticed the benefits and that people were interested in her experience. While others may have had a month off alcohol in January, Robinson was the first person to commercialize it and trademarked Dry January for Alcohol Concern. Around the same time Nicole Brodeur of The Seattle Times wrote a column on her first Dry January motivated by a friend who had done the same for several years before.

In its first year, 4,000 people signed up for the Dry January challenge and it has grown in popularity ever since with 215,000 people globally signing up to take part in 2024. The Dry January challenge was endorsed by Public Health England in 2015 leading to a large uptake in numbers and steady increase in participants year on year. Research by the University of Sussex published in 2020 found that those signing up to take part in the Dry January challenge using Alcohol Change UK's free Try Dry app and/or coaching emails were twice as likely to have a completely alcohol-free month, compared to those who try to avoid alcohol on their own in January, and have significantly improved wellbeing and healthier drinking six months later.

== International partners ==
The Dry January challenge has official partners in Switzerland, Germany, Norway, Iceland, France, South Tyrol, the Netherlands and the US.

- Dry January France launched in 2020, by Federation Addiction.
- Dry January Switzerland was launched in 2021 by a broad coalition of non-profit organisations, including public innovation platform staatslabor, Blaues Kreuz Schweiz and GREA.
- Dry January Norway and Iceland was launched in 2022 by a partnership of organisations IOGT, Juvente, and Edru. Blå Kors Norge will deliver the campaign from 2025.
- Dry January Germany launched in 2023 with Blaues Kreuz Deutschland and Blaues Kreuz Schweiz.
- Dry January USA launched in 2023 with Meharry Medical College as the official sub-license holder.
- Dry January South Tyrol (Italy) launched in 2024 with Forum Prävention.
- In the Netherlands Dry January is a part of the "IkPas" ("i pass") campaign, an initiative of the Trimbos Institute, Windesheim University of Applied Sciences and the local departments of the Municipal Health Service. People can participate in either the 30-day Dry January period, or a 40-day challenge between Ash Wednesday and the Sunday before Easter, the traditional period of Christian Lent.

In some countries, such as the Czech Republic and Canada, Dry February (or Dry Feb) is campaigned instead. The Finnish Government had launched a campaign called "Sober January" in 1942 as part of its war effort.

== Other countries ==
=== France ===
In France, the Dry January campaign has been running since 2020.

=== Switzerland ===
In Switzerland, the Dry January campaign has been running since 2021.

=== United States ===
A Morning Consult poll conducted January 4–5, 2021, with 2,200 US adults found that 13 percent of American respondents were participating in "Dry January". This compared with 11% in previous years. Of participants, 79 percent attributed the decision to being healthier while 72 percent were trying to drink less alcohol in general; 63 percent said they wanted to "reset" their drinking, and 49 percent said they were drinking too much during the COVID-19 pandemic. In 2022, 35% of adult drinkers decided to become abstinent at the start of the New Year. Some believed that they would go back to their old drinking habits right after Dry January, but studies have shown that the month of abstinence can have a lasting impact for months down the road.

Dry January USA was launched in January 2022, when James E.K. Hildreth, president and CEO of the college, signed a 5-year initial agreement with Alcohol Change UK. The program is based at Meharry Medical College in Nashville, Tennessee.

== Cautions ==
For participants with a dependency on alcohol, Dry January may lead to symptoms of alcohol withdrawal syndrome if they start out abstaining completely. For such people, experts advise consultation with a health professional before participating in this exercise.

== See also ==
- Dry July
- Ocsober
- Veganuary
