= Ocsober =

Taking a break from alcoholic beverages

Ocsober Logo

Ocsober is an Australian fundraising initiative that encourages people to give up alcohol for the month of October.

The money raised by voluntary participants goes to Life Education Australia, the organisation behind the educational mascot, Healthy Harold. For over 30 years, the well-known giraffe has been teaching Australian children how to enjoy a healthy lifestyle by resisting participation in drug and alcohol abuse. During 2014, Ocsober aimed to raise $1,000,000 to help Life Education Australia and Healthy Harold go into even more schools across Australia. Ocsober is also used as an opportunity to highlight the growing danger of binge drinking and alcohol abuse, particularly among young Australians.

The statistics provided by Life Education estimates that 3,200 Australians die as a result of excessive alcohol consumption each year, while 81,000 end up in hospitals for the same reason. The organisation behind this initiative is also hoping to promote more permanent changes to Australian drinking habits. Participants will not just help a good cause but also might enjoy other potential benefits from a month off alcohol including feeling healthier and fitter, weight loss and the chance to try new sober activities.

Outside of Australia, in countries such as the US and UK, Ocsober is celebrated as "Sober October".

== See also ==
- Alcohol in Australia
- Drinkwise
- Dry January
- Dry July
