= Brem =

Indonesian traditional fermented food

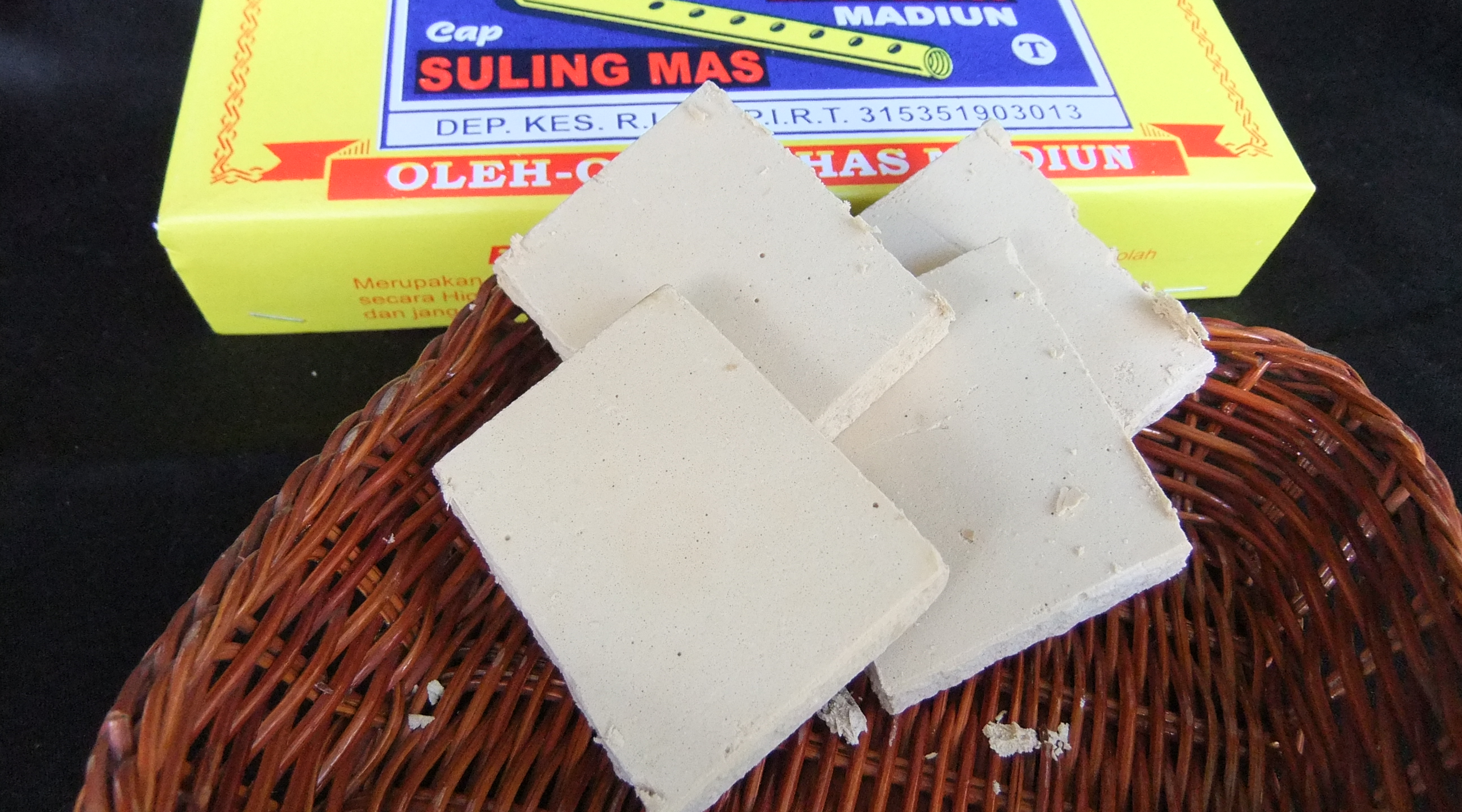
- Suling Mas brand Madiun brem
- Place of origin: Indonesia

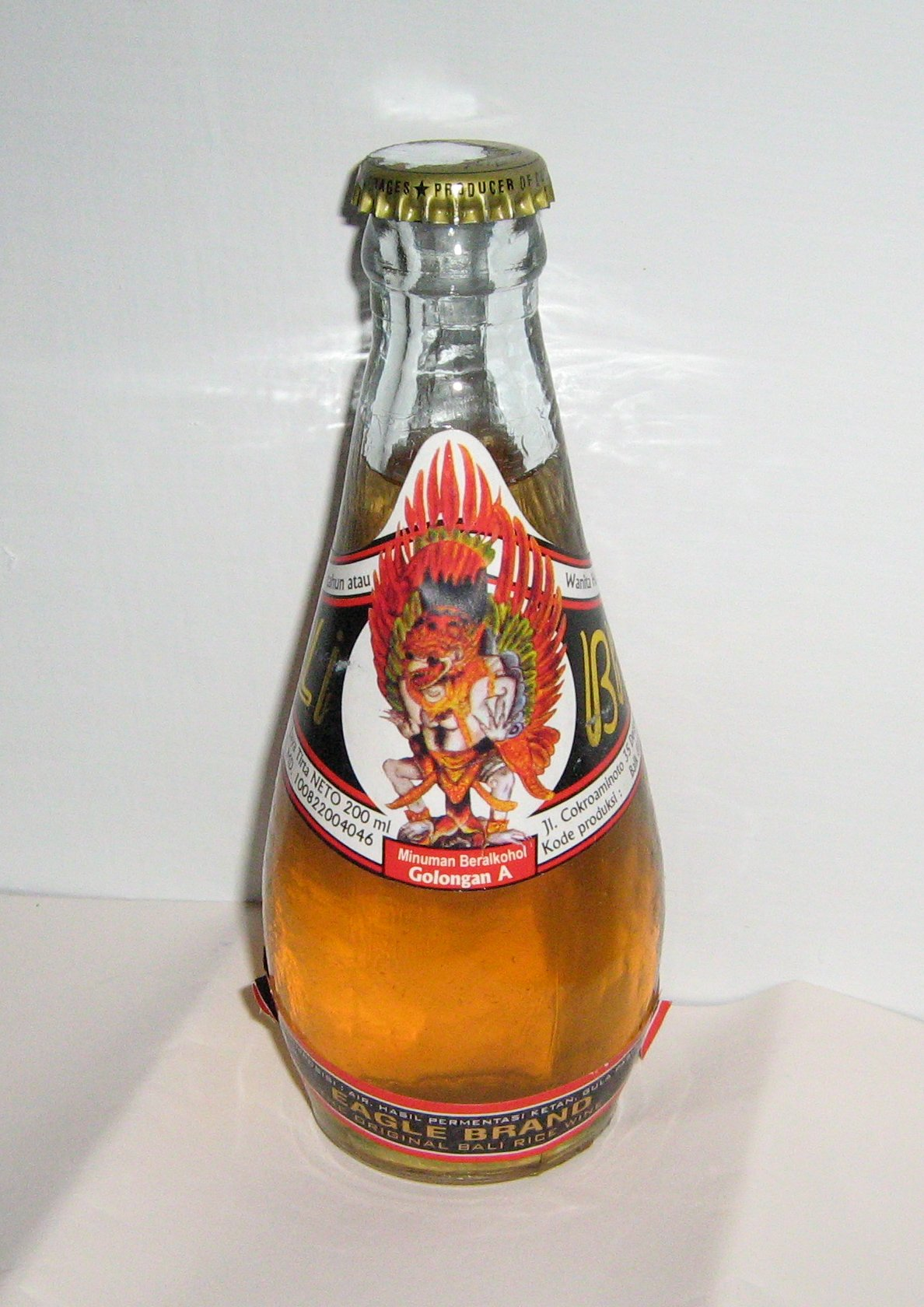
Eagle brand Balinese brem

Brem is a traditional fermented food or fermented beverage from Indonesia. There are two types of brem, brem cake (solid) that is usually eaten as a snack from Madiun and Wonogiri, and brem beverage (liquid) made of rice wine from Bali and Nusa Tenggara, but mostly known from Bali. Brem first appeared in Java around the year 1000, based on investigations regarding old Javanese inscriptions and literature.

Brem as a beverage is consumed and holds important use in certain temple ceremonies of Hinduism called Tetabuhan, as an offering beverage for Buto Kala (lit. Kala the Giant) in order to evoke harmony. Brem can be either white or red depending on the proportions of white and black glutinous rice used in production. As a liquid, brem's taste can range from very sweet to semi-sweet, yet acidic and contains alcohol with varying degrees, usually from 5% to 14%.

Brem cake is produced in two places, Wonogiri and Madiun. This kind of brem is believed by Indonesian consumers to be beneficial for stimulating the circulatory system. It is also reported to prevent dermatitis, most likely due to the presence of significant amounts of B vitamins produced by the microorganisms used in its fermentation. This product is consumed as a snack and is not part of the daily family diet.

== Production of brem ==
=== Fermented beverage ===
Liquid brem is made from a fermented mash of black/ white glutinous rice (known as Ketan) using a dry-starter called Ragi tape. Glutinous rice is soaked and drained, steamed for 1 hour, and then cooled down. The cooled rice is then inoculated with Ragi tape and amylolysis begins. A honey-like rice syrup settles in the bottom of the malting vessel. Following 3 days of conversion from rice starch to sugar, a yeast culture is added, and alcoholic fermentation begins. Alcoholic fermentation typically goes on for two weeks.

== See also ==
- Alcohol in Indonesia
- Sake
- Tapai
- List of fermented foods
- List of Indonesian beverages
