= Alcohol Beverages Australia =

Australian non-profit organisation

Alcohol Beverages Australia (ABA) is an Australian non-profit membership–based organisation that represents retailers, producers and manufacturers of alcohol in Australia. The current president is Greg Holland and its CEO is Andrew Wilsmore.

== Background ==
ABA was formed in 2015. ABA's members are producers and retailers of alcohol and the industry associations representing beer, wine, spirits and retail drinks.

The organization has been active in areas of alcohol regulation, including the NHMRC Drinking Guidelines, New South Wales lockouts, and pregnancy labelling.

== Membership ==
Current members are:

- Accolade Wines
- Australian Distillers Association
- Australian Grape and Wine Authority
- Australian Liquor Marketers
- Brewers Association of Australia
- Brown-Forman
- Campari Group
- Coca-Cola Amatil
- Coles Liquor
- Diageo
- Endeavour Group
- Lion
- Pernod Ricard Australia
- Retail Drinks Australia
- Spirits & Cocktail Australia
- Suntory Global Spirits
- Treasury Wine Estates

== Leadership ==
President

The following people have been president of ABA:

Name	Term start	Term end	Term of office
Giuseppe Minissale	2015	2017	3 years
Bryan Fry	2017	2021	4 years
Greg Holland	2021	Present	Current

Chief Executive Officer

The following people have been Chief Executive Officer of ABA:

Name	Term start	Term end	Term of office	Title of office
Joanne Scillance	2015	2015	1 year	Executive Officer
Fergus Taylor	2016	2019	3 years	Executive Officer
Andrew Wilsmore	2019	Present	Current	Chief Executive Officer
