= Bali Hai Beer =

Indonesian beer brand

Bali Hai
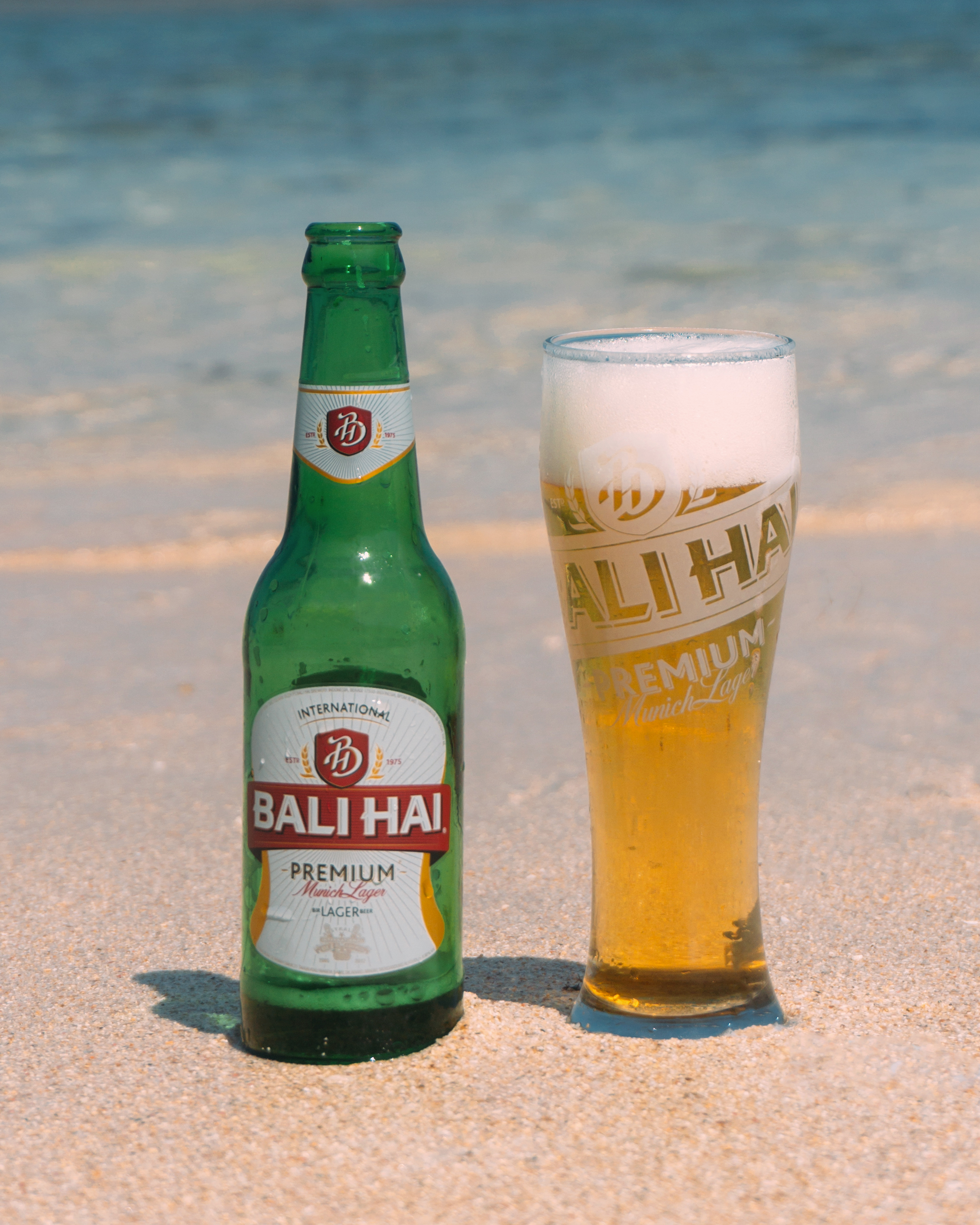
- Type: Indonesian lager beer
- Manufacturer: Bali Hai Brewery Indonesia
- Origin: Indonesia; International (export only)
- Introduced: 1975
- Alcohol by volume: 5%
- Colour: Pale
- Variants: Bali Hai Draft Beer
- Website: Bali Hai

Bali Hai is a brand of Indonesian lager beer produced by PT Bali Hai Brewery Indonesia since 1975. Currently the beer and its variants are sold in more than 20 countries, including Singapore, Myanmar, Korea, New Zealand, to Far East Russia. The Bali Hai brands and variants includes Bali Hai Premium, Draft Beer, El Diablo Original, Panther Black, El Diablo Strong Brew, Knox and Folsom. Bali Hai Brewery Indonesia's head office is located in Jalan Laksamana RE Martadinata, Ruko Permata Ancol Blok F No.6 North Jakarta 14420, Indonesia.

== See also ==
- Alcohol in Indonesia
- Bali Hai
