= Alcoholism in rural Australia =

Public health issue in rural Australia

Alcohol is the most frequently used drug by residents living in all isolated, remote and rural regions in Australia. Alcohol consumption is particularly misused by individuals in these areas due to numerous factors distinctive of rural Australia. These factors consist of the reduced access to education and health care professionals with alcohol treatment services, leading to higher rates of unemployment and economic disadvantage. These characteristics promote increased levels of disease, injury and death as a result of the high alcohol-related harms that are substantial in rural communities across Australia.

== Consumption ==
In 2014, the Australian Institute of Health and Welfare stated that 80% of Australians regularly consume alcohol. In Australia, a third of the population live in remote and rural areas, where a proportion of these adults engage in risk-taking behaviours such as excessive alcohol misuse which is significantly higher than in major cities of Australia. In 2010, the National Drug Strategy Household Survey (NDSHS) reported 78% of regional Australia is consuming alcoholic beverages at extremely high-risk levels in which are harmful for life. Unlike in major cities, only 19% of people are drinking alcohol at these life-harming levels.

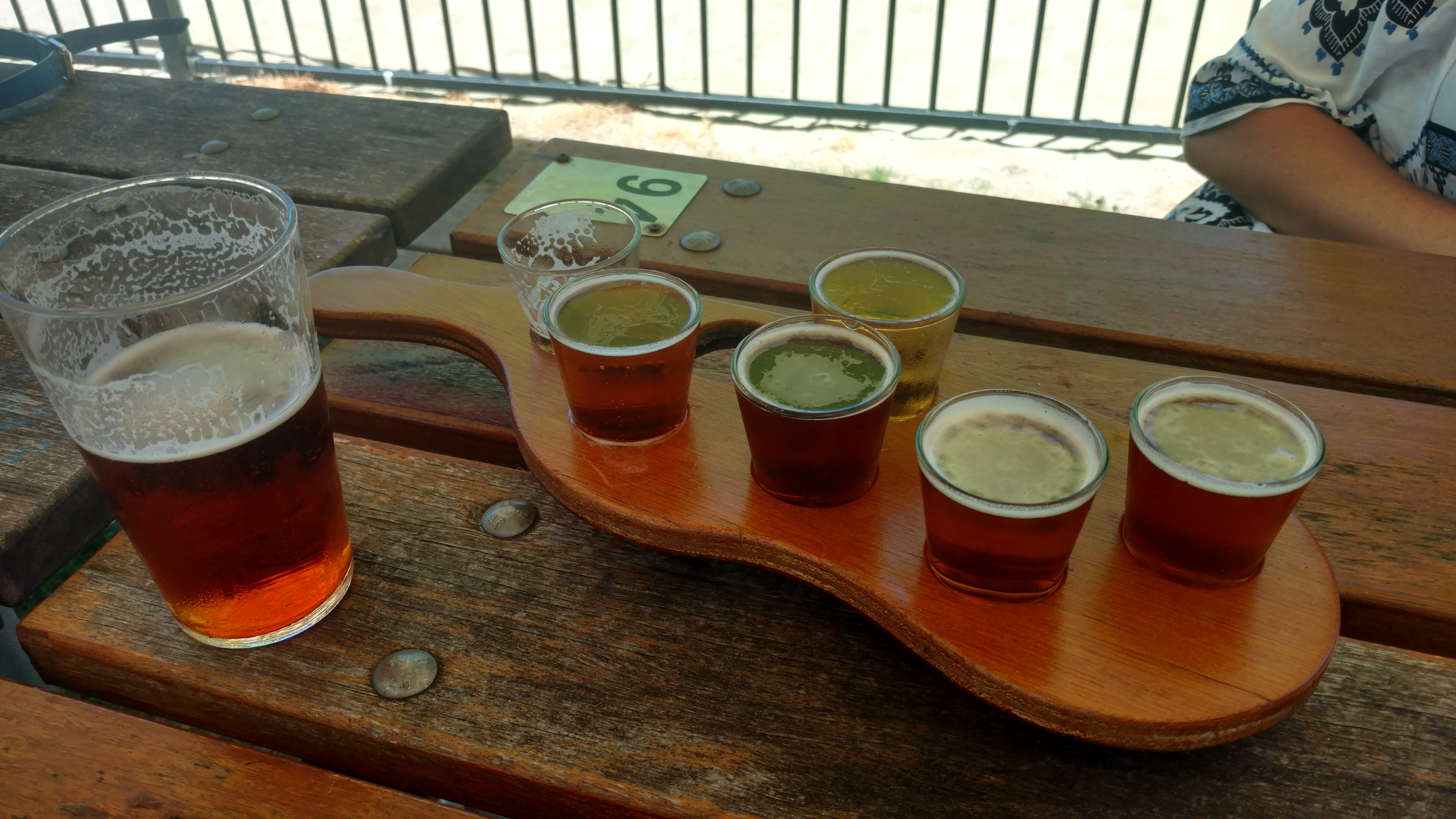
Beer testing at Cheeky Monkey Brewery, Margaret River, 2016

The 2011 Australian Burden of Disease Study noted adults in rural and isolated regions are 1.4 times more probable to surpass the recommended amount of consuming alcohol in Australia, contrasting to adults living in major Australian cities. The study found that alcohol use in rural Australia significantly contributes to the overall Australian disease burden by 5.1%.

This is because alcohol consumption in Australia is correlated with pleasure and celebration, but in remote regions, there's a limited variety of venues to socialise at, allowing residents to engage in excessive drinking. Men and young adults residing in rural communities are particularly liable to consume alcohol at high-risk levels due to them experiencing boredom at a higher rate, leading them to excessively drink.

The prevalence of drought in Australia and the pressure of rising farm debt drives many farmers to drink as a form of self-medication.

== Indigenous alcohol consumption ==
While Aboriginal and Torres Strait Islander peoples are less likely to drink alcohol than non-Indigenous Australians, Indigenous Australians in rural and isolated regions report higher levels of risky alcohol consumption than non-Indigenous Australians. Harmful alcohol consumption has been identified as one contributing factor to rates of domestic violence and youth crime in Indigenous communities, although this intersects with broader structural and historical factors. In 2022-23, First Nations people were 1.4 times as likely as non-Indigenous people to have consumed 11 or more standard drinks on a single occasion during the past year, and 1.8 times as likely to have done so in the past month.

This is as a result of numerous factors such as the “disconnection to culture, traditions and country, social exclusion, discrimination and isolation, trauma, poverty, and lack of adequate access to services”. These factors also contribute to education and employment outcomes, which in turn can increase vulnerability to harmful substance use and other risk-taking behaviours. However, in 2014 and 2015, the NATSISS discovered a decline by 4% in rural Indigenous people older than 15 years, exceeding the guidelines for risky consumption of alcohol since 2008.

However, the idea that Aboriginal and Torres Strait Islander People are genetically more susceptible to alcoholism compared to non-Indigenous Australians is a harmful myth rooted in pseudoscience; this notion parallels the Firewater Myth. Contrary to popular belief, in 2023 First Nations people were 1.2 times as likely as non-Indigenous people to abstain from alcohol entirely or to drink 4+ standard drinks per month, while non-Indigenous people were 1.1 times as likely to consume over 10 standard drinks weekly.

== Binge drinking ==
Binge drinking is five or more drinks in one sitting. In rural Australia, it is a severe problem as a result of the poor health determinants distinctive of these rural areas, including limited healthcare access, economic disadvantage, high unemployment levels and low levels of education. 54% of young and Indigenous people in isolated areas of Australia are acutely high-level binge drinkers. Binge drinking behaviour is “heavily shaped by prevailing cultural norms” such as the “acceptability of binge drinking”.

Binge drinking in rural areas of Australia has severe and problematic long-term impacts on individuals who perform these behaviours, not only to themselves but to the entire health outcome of rural Australia. In particular, as children and teenagers’ brains aren't properly developed yet, the immense level of binge drinking performed by these young individuals in rural Australia has a greater long-term impact on them both psychologically and physically, further adding to overall health disadvantage in rural communities.

=== Decline ===
In 2016, the Australian Institute of Health and Welfare reported that younger adults were drinking less compared to 2013. 42% of individuals aged between 18 and 24 binge drank a minimum of five alcoholic standard drinks per month. This statistic was a 5% decrease since 2013. Young adults in rural areas decreased their levels of binge drinking from 31% in 2010 to 18.5% in 2016. This kind of behaviour remains a prominent and destructive issue in rural Australian society.

== Alcohol abuse and mental health ==
The abuse and misuse of alcohol in rural Australia is a crucial aspect and result of the excessive alcohol consumption in rural and remote communities in Australia. This can lead to individuals experiencing severe mental health issues or pursuing violence. As rural communities have less access to healthcare and its professionals, and rehabilitation services, depression, anxiety and suicide are much more prominent due to rural dwellers' extreme levels of alcohol consumption.

Intentional and non-intentional deaths and injuries are considerably greater in remote regions than in major cities, as a consequence of rural Australians abusing alcohol and becoming violent, depressed and suicidal. In these isolated areas, a third of young people aged between 14 and 24 have been physically abused by people who were highly intoxicated. This severe misuse of alcohol inevitably contributes to the rapidly rising mortality rates in rural Australia, as well as the increased levels of disability amongst rural people who are victims of such abuse.

The Australian Rural Mental Health Study examined the way in which unnecessary alcohol use can determine someone's psychological symptoms and damage their mental health in rural communities. As evident in the graph, the study demonstrated that at least one individual in each age group consumed alcohol at a life-damaging level. The youngest age group drinks alcohol in the most harmful category, substantially contributing to the high levels of psychological distress that 18-34 year olds experience in rural areas.

== Preventative strategies ==
Whilst excessive alcohol consumption is evidently a severe problem in rural communities, there are a number of strategies the Australian government has implemented to reduce these poor health behaviours:

=== The Ministerial Drug and Alcohol Forum ===
In 2015, the Council of Australian Governments decided it was vital to implement a new and innovative Ministerial Forum to endorse drug and alcohol preventative strategies in Australia. The Forum created a new policy, namely the National Drug Strategy, which aims to prevent and decrease harm facilitated by the excessive use of alcohol and drugs in Australia in 2017–2026. The strategy is divided into more specific categories, whereby in 2018 the "National Alcohol and other Drug Workforce Development Strategy" illustrates the need for effective alcohol reduction strategies and specialised health services in rural, isolated and remote areas.

=== The National Preventative Health Taskforce ===
This preventative strategy aims for Australia to be the "Healthiest Country by 2020" and recognises the inequities of health and alcohol misuse between rural and urban civilians in Australia. The preventative health framework has numerous main aims to reduce the misuse of alcohol in rural regions of Australia. Some of these include:

- Modifying consumer supply and demand of alcohol to promote safer alcohol consumption.
- Creating more primary health care facilities in rural Australia to assist residents in making better choices for their health.
- Utilise the Australian "Close the Gap" government strategy to reduce the serious health disadvantage amongst Indigenous Australians.

=== The National Alliance for Action on Alcohol ===
This national organisation was formed to raise awareness of healthy practice in Australia, particularly in rural regions, and simultaneously improve its policies to reduce alcohol harm and consumption in these areas. The strategy has implemented an "Alcohol Policy Scorecard" across Australia, which tracks and benchmarks all state governments' movement of attempting to prevent and reduce harm that has been facilitated by significant alcohol consumption. In 2018, the alliance stated that the Northwest Territory government's drug and alcohol strategy has still not been finalised, unlike in the Northern Territory, which had made significant progress of reducing alcohol-facilitated harm by 68% since implementing the "Alcohol Harm Minimisation Action Plan".

== Effective interventions ==
Apart from the many preventative strategies that the Australian government has implemented to reduce alcohol misuse in rural Australia, there are also a number of programs that can assist with this reduction. Such interventions include "partial or complete bans on promotion of alcohol, measures to reduce drink driving, and targeted advice in the primary care setting".
