= 1925 Western Australian prohibition referendum =

Referendum held in Western Australia in 1925

4 April 1925

Results
Choice	Votes	%
Yes	41,254	34.88%
No	77,030	65.12%
Valid votes	118,284	99.33%
Invalid or blank votes	795	0.67%
Total votes	119,079	100.00%

A referendum was held on 4 April 1925 in the Australian state of Western Australia on the topic of prohibition.

== History ==
The Licensing Act Amendment Act 1922 (No.39 of 1922) was assented to by the Governor of Western Australia on 22 December 1922. Section 60 of the Act (which became Section 87(e) of the Licensing Act 1911) stipulated that "in 1925, and in every fifth year thereafter... there shall be taken a poll of the electors in every electoral district on the proposal that prohibition shall come into force in Western Australia". It also provided that if prohibition was passed, then in subsequent polls "the proposal shall be that licenses for the sale of intoxicating liquor shall be restored". The franchise was to be the same as that for the Western Australian Legislative Assembly, and a proposal could only be carried if 60% of all votes were in favour.

Prior to the enactment of this provision, two referendums, one in 1911 and another in 1921, had rejected prohibition.

== Referendum results ==
Question: Do you favour Prohibition coming into force in Western Australia?

Valid votes	Informal votes	For		Against	
119,079	795	41,254	34.88%	77,030	65.12%

The proposal was rejected.

== Aftermath ==
Despite the legislation calling for five-yearly referendums, only one more was held in 1950. Section 87 of the Licensing Act was repealed in 1959.
