= Bintang Beer =

Indonesian beer brand

Bintang
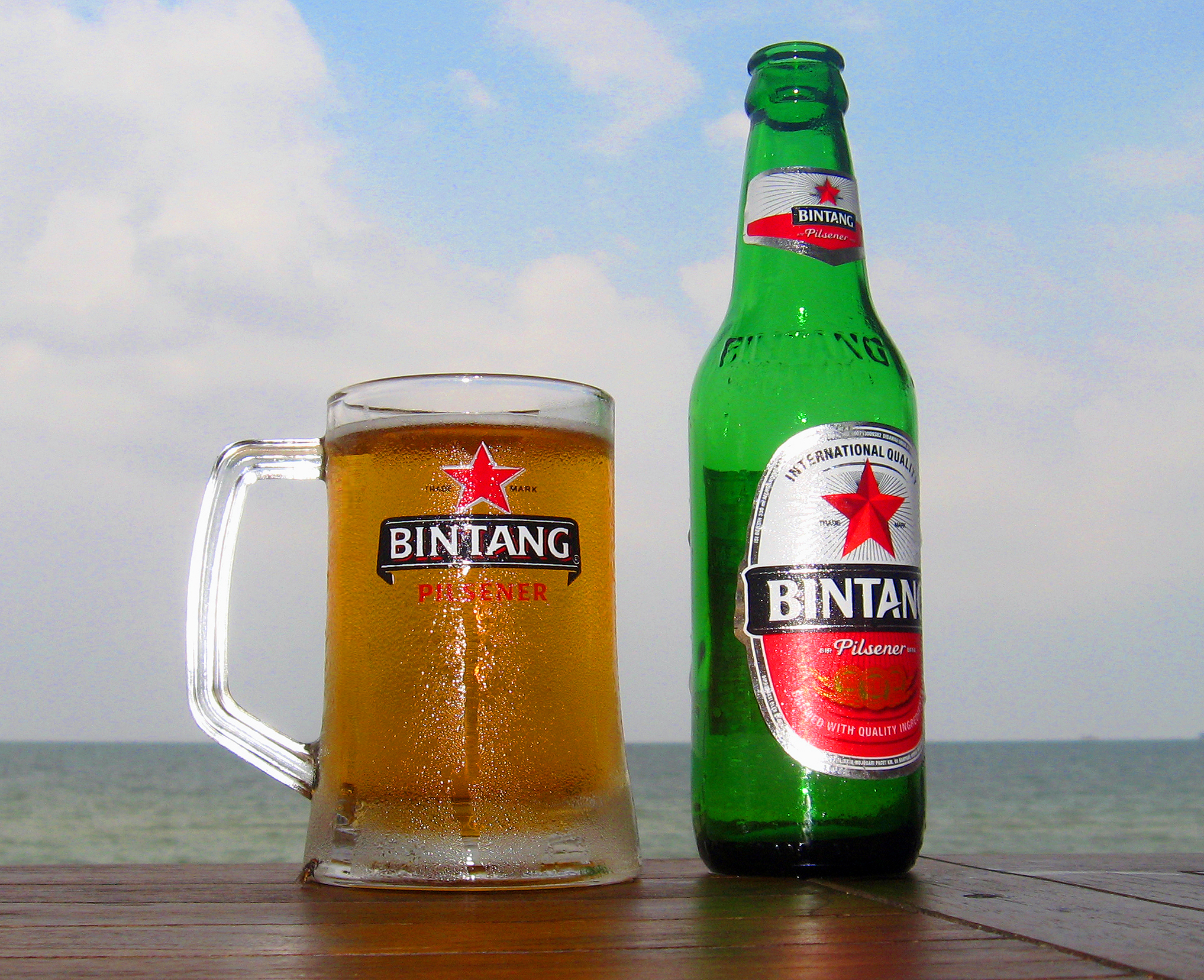
- Bintang beer and mug
- Manufacturer: PT Multi Bintang Indonesia Tbk, part of Heineken
- Origin: Surabaya, Soerabaja Residency, Dutch East Indies (now East Java, Indonesia)
- Introduced: 1929; 97 years ago
- Alcohol by volume: 4.7% pilsner
- Style: Lager
- Website: www.multibintang.co.id

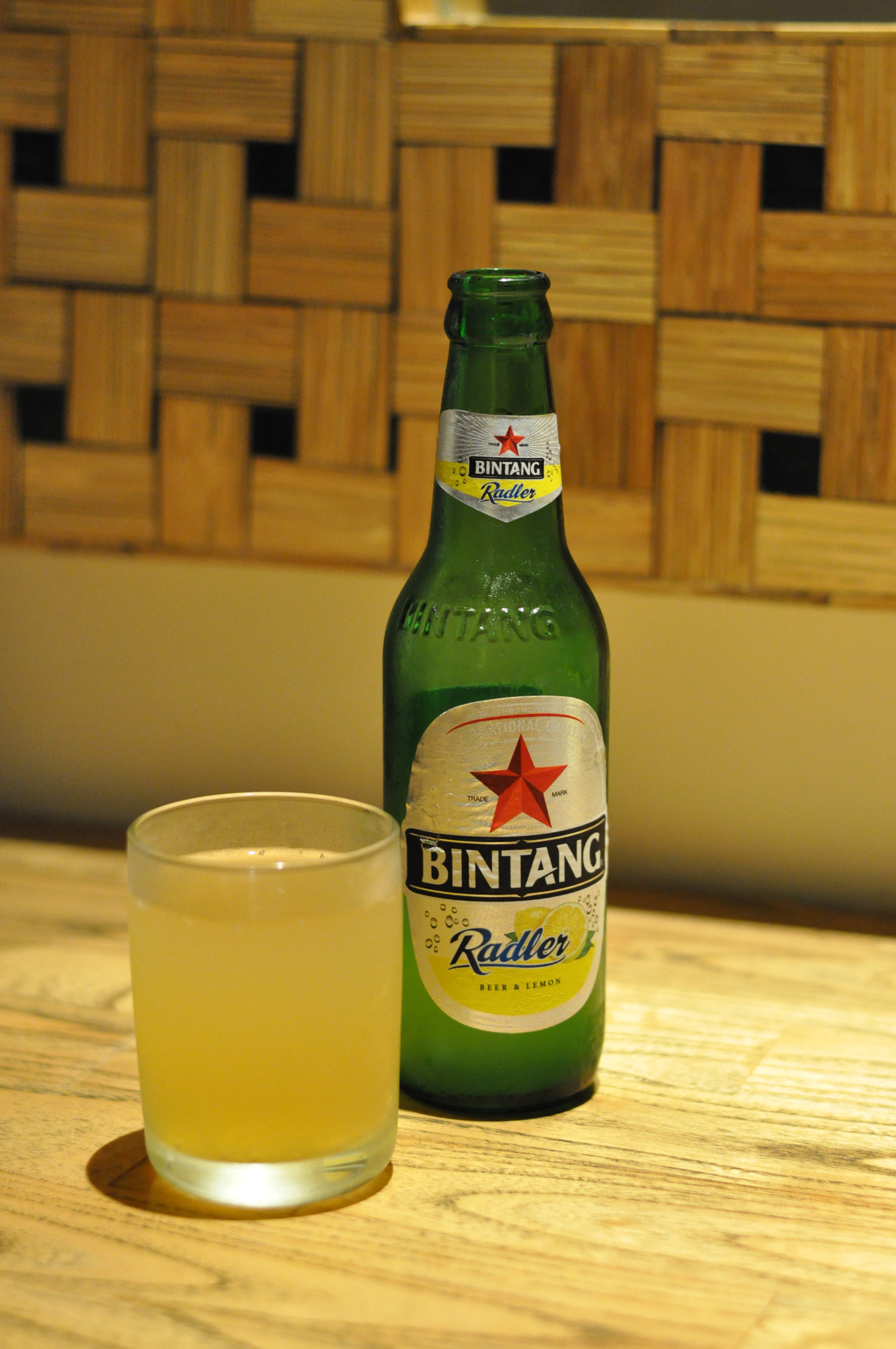
Radler edition of Bintang

Bintang Beer (Indonesian: Bir Bintang, lit. 'Star Beer') is an Indonesian beer brand and is produced by PT Multi Bintang Indonesia Tbk, a subsidiary of Heineken Asia Pacific part of Heineken.

The beer is styled as a pale lager, gold in colour with an ideal serving temperature of 7 °C. The 4.7% ABV Pilsner has a malt and hop flavour. Because it is a localized version of Heineken, its taste is similar and comparable to Heineken, and the Bintang bottle is reminiscent of a Heineken bottle; the red star on the bottle is similar to the one on a bottle of Heineken. Bintang makes a malt based beverage called Bintang Zero 0.0%, a low alcohol Radler called Bintang Radler (in both lemon and grapefruit flavours) 2.0%, a soft drink product called Green Sands.

Construction of the brewery began in Surabaya in 1929 during Dutch colonial rule of Indonesia. In 1949, following Indonesian independence, the brewery was renamed 'Heineken's Indonesian Brewery Company'. In 1957 the Indonesian Government appropriated the brewery, and retained control for the next ten years. In 1967 Heineken resumed operations of the brewery, which was later renamed "Multi Bintang Indonesia".

In 2011, Bintang Beer won a gold medal for Lager (Class 2) and Champion Beer for the lager category at the Brewing Industry International Awards (BIIA 2011) in London.

Bir Bintang brand was awarded as Top 50 Most Valuable Indonesian Brand 2013 by Brand Finance.

== See also ==
- Alcohol in Indonesia
- List of Indonesian beverages
