= 1950 Western Australian prohibition referendum =

A referendum was held on 9 December 1950 in the Australian state of Western Australia on the topic of prohibition. It was the state's fourth referendum on the topic of liquor licensing, and the second put to voters with the same wording. The proposal to prohibit alcohol was rejected by 73% of voters.

== Overview ==
The referendum was conducted pursuant to the Licensing Act 1911, specifically Section 87(e) which had been added by an amending act in 1922, and which mandated a referendum on the topic of liquor licensing every five years. However, none had been conducted since the one in 1925.

== Referendum results ==
Question: Do you agree with the proposal that prohibition shall come into force in Western Australia?

YES	NO
27.0% (60,001 votes)	73.0% (162,231 votes)

== Aftermath ==
No further polls were held on the topic of liquor licensing, and Section 87 of the Licensing Act was repealed in 1959.
