= William Wongso =

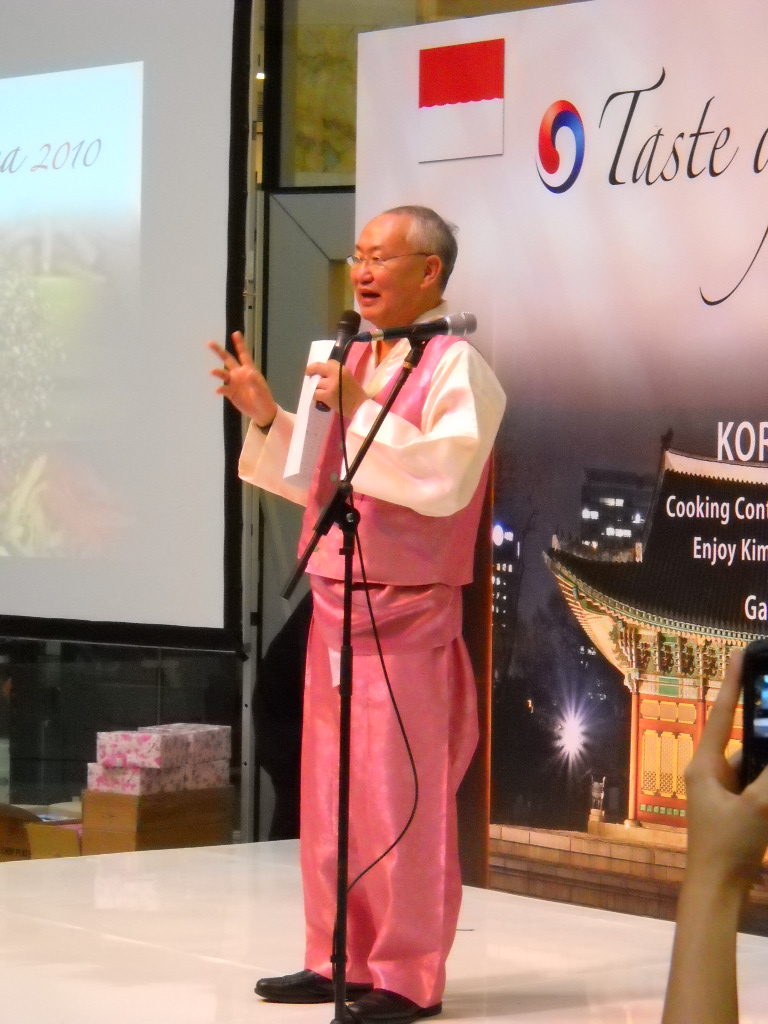
- William Wongso in 2010
- Born: William Wirjaatmadja Wongso; 12 April 1947 (age 78); Malang, East Java, Indonesia
- Spouse: Lusianawati Rahardjo
- Children: 2

William Wirjaatmadja Wongso (born 12 April 1947) is a culinary expert from Indonesia, specializing in Asian and European cuisine. He is the son of Soewadi Wongso (Wong See Hwa).

Wongso initially did not receive formal culinary training, but learned from sidewalk food vendors and eventually trained in pastry and baking with chefs at hotels in Indonesia.

In 1978, Wongso attended East Sydney Technical College for its baking program. In 1982, he attended Swiss Masters Bakers and Confectionery program in Lucerne, Switzerland, and then spent the following years of training in pastry, baking, chocolate, and ice cream in the Netherlands, Germany, France, and Italy until 1987.

Wongso intended originally to follow the in footsteps of his father and pursue a career in film and photography, but his father's hobby of cooking inspired his passion for the culinary arts.

In 2001, France's Ministry of Agriculture awarded Wongso the Chevalier dans l'Ordre National du Merite for his role in promoting French cuisine and gastronomy.

In 2008, Indonesian Vice-President Jusuf Kalla awarded Wongso the Professional Certification Authority (BNSP) for his dedication to culinary vocational education.

In 2009, the Korean Tourism Board named Wongso the Goodwill Ambassador for South Korea.
