= Peter Hurley =

Australian businessman

Peter Hurley AO
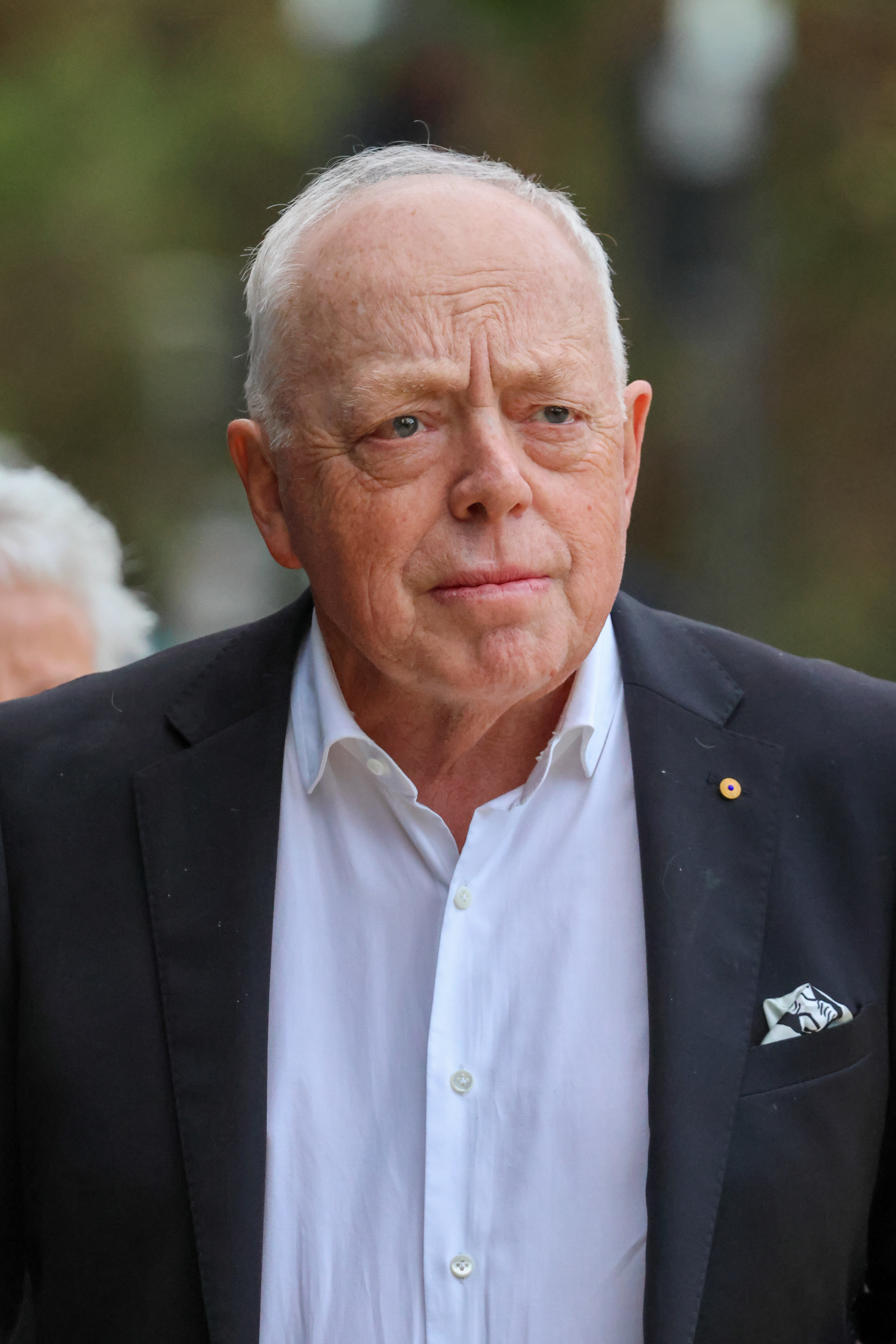
- Hurley in 2026
- Occupations: Businessman; hotelier
- Years active: 1975–present
- Organisation: Hurley Hotel Group
- Spouse: Jenny Pengelly (m. 1979)
- Children: 3
- Website: hurleyhotelgroup.com.au

Peter Hurley is the President of the South Australian branch of the Australian Hotels Association and on the board of the Australian Broadcasting Corporation.
