= Delta Djakarta =

Company of Indonesia

PT Delta Djakarta Tbk
- Company type: Public
- Traded as: IDX: DLTA
- Industry: Beverage
- Founded: 1932
- Headquarters: Bekasi, Indonesia
- Key people: Jose Daniel A. Javier (President Director)
- Products: Beers
- Net income: 142,367,000,000 rupiah (2024)
- Total assets: 1,118,177,000,000 rupiah (2024)
- Owners: San Miguel Malaysia (58,33%); DKI Jakarta Provincial Government (26,25%)
- Website: www.deltajkt.co.id

PT Delta Djakarta is a brewing company founded in 1932 and headquartered in Bekasi, Indonesia. The main brand is Anker, a 4.5% abv pale lager. Delta Djakarta is partially owned by San Miguel Malaysia (L) Private Limited, a subsidiary of Filipino brewery San Miguel Corporation, which owns 58,33% stake; while the government of Jakarta owns remaining 26,25% stake.

== Brands ==
- Anker Beer
- Carlsberg
- San Miguel Beer
