= Staatslabor =

Swiss-based think tank

The Staatslabor (state laboratory) is a 2016 founded think tank that supports Swiss authorities with administrative solutions.

== History and objectives ==
In 2016, Alenka Bonnard, Danny Bürkli, Nicola Forster, and Maximilian Stern founded the Staatslabor with the support of the Migros Pionierfonds, the Impact Hub Bern and the British Foundation Centre for Public Impact. The association sees itself as a think tank and networking platform that supports the Swiss administration at the federal, cantonal, and municipal levels with innovative solutions. The Staatslabor creates a range of governance services without competition, wrote digital journalist Adrienne Fichter. Administrations are confronted with increasingly complex problems and technological change, says co-director Alenka Bonnard, which is why the Staatslabor wants to make it easier for them to access innovations.

== Activities ==
=== Covid-19 crisis ===
During the covid-19 crisis, the Federal Department of Home Affairs (FDHA) appointed managing directors Bonnard and Bürkli to the Soundingboard of the crisis management team, which advises the Federal Council, with Staatslabor representing civil society as the third pillar alongside business and research. At a live press conference held by the FDHA, Bonnard presented a website that civil society groups and initiatives can use to submit concerns to the crisis management team via Staatslabor and forward them to the relevant administrative bodies. Staatslabor was one of the initiators of "Versus Virus", a series of hackathons under the auspices of the FDHA and the EAER, which sought to develop innovative ideas for the covid19 crisis.

=== Cooperation with administrations ===
The Federal Department of Foreign Affairs (FDFA) appointed Staatslabor to a working group to draft the report "Switzerland in the World 2028". The working group drew criticism because two of the three outside experts – besides Bonnard – were business representatives. On behalf of the Federal Office of Communications, Staatslabor worked on formulating a digital strategy for Switzerland. Staatslabor also works for municipalities and cities for example to involve the population in problem-solving for Disposal and Recycling of the City of Bern (ERB) or for the Office for Gender Equality of the City of Zurich.

=== Think tank & innovation promotion ===
Staatslabor adapted Kickbox, a tool developed by Adobe, to Staatsbox in order to initiate innovation processes in public authorities. Staatslabor communicates with a network of experts who – along with administrative representatives – share their views in interviews on a blog. Once every first Thursday of the month, experts from a wide range of fields present their findings to administrative employees in the Staatskantine (state canteen). Presentations may be on topics such as application trials and problems with digital identity cards or blockchain technology for the digitisation of public services.

== Organisation and management ==
Staatslabor is organised as a non-profit association. Alenka Bonnard and Dario Meloni are co-directors.

== Literature ==
- Alenka Bonnard & Nicola Forster: Soziale Innovation in der Schweiz: Nachdenken über die Zukunft. In: Perspektiven Sozialer Innovation. Lynn Blattmann (ed.), Arcas Foundation, 2016 Zurich. ISBN 978-3-033-06009-8.
- Danny Bürkli & Nicola Forster: Die Welt der sozialen Innovation: Inspiration aus dem Ausland. In: Perspektiven Sozialer Innovation. Lynn Blattmann (ed.), Arcas Foundation, 2016 Zurich, ISBN 978-3-033-06009-8.
- Nicola Forster: Künstliche Intelligenz: Die Zukunft der Verwaltung. In: Switzerland 2030. Swiss Federal Chancellery (ed.), Bern & NZZ Libro, Zurich, 2018, ISBN 978-3-03810-360-8.
