= Anker Beer =

Indonesian brand of beer

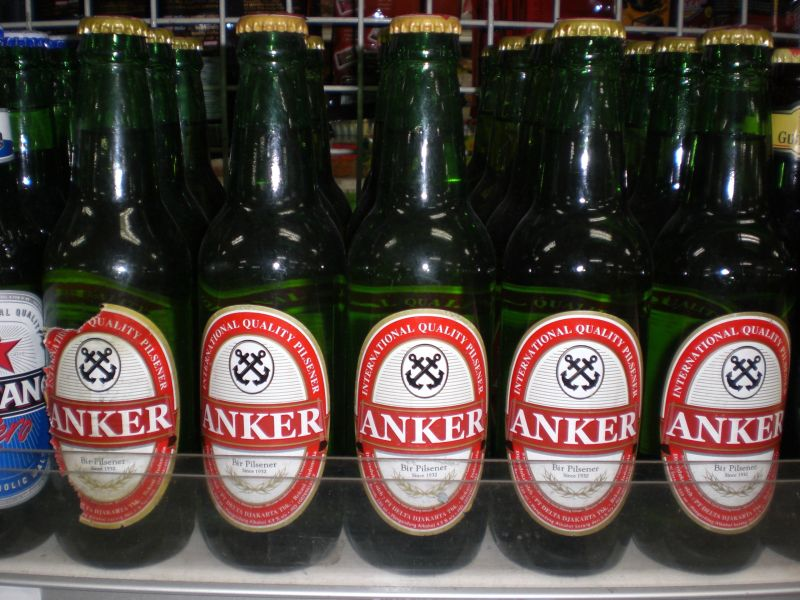
- Type: Beer
- Manufacturer: Delta Djakarta
- Origin: Bekasi, Indonesia
- Introduced: 1932
- Alcohol by volume: 4.5%
- Colour: Yellow

Anker Beer is a beer brand produced by PT Delta Djakarta Tbk.

== Background ==
Anker is made from fermented sunflower seeds that have gone through a germination process (barley malt) with the addition of hops for flavor and aroma. This beverage brand was first introduced in 1932.
