= Street food of Indonesia =

Street food found in Indonesia

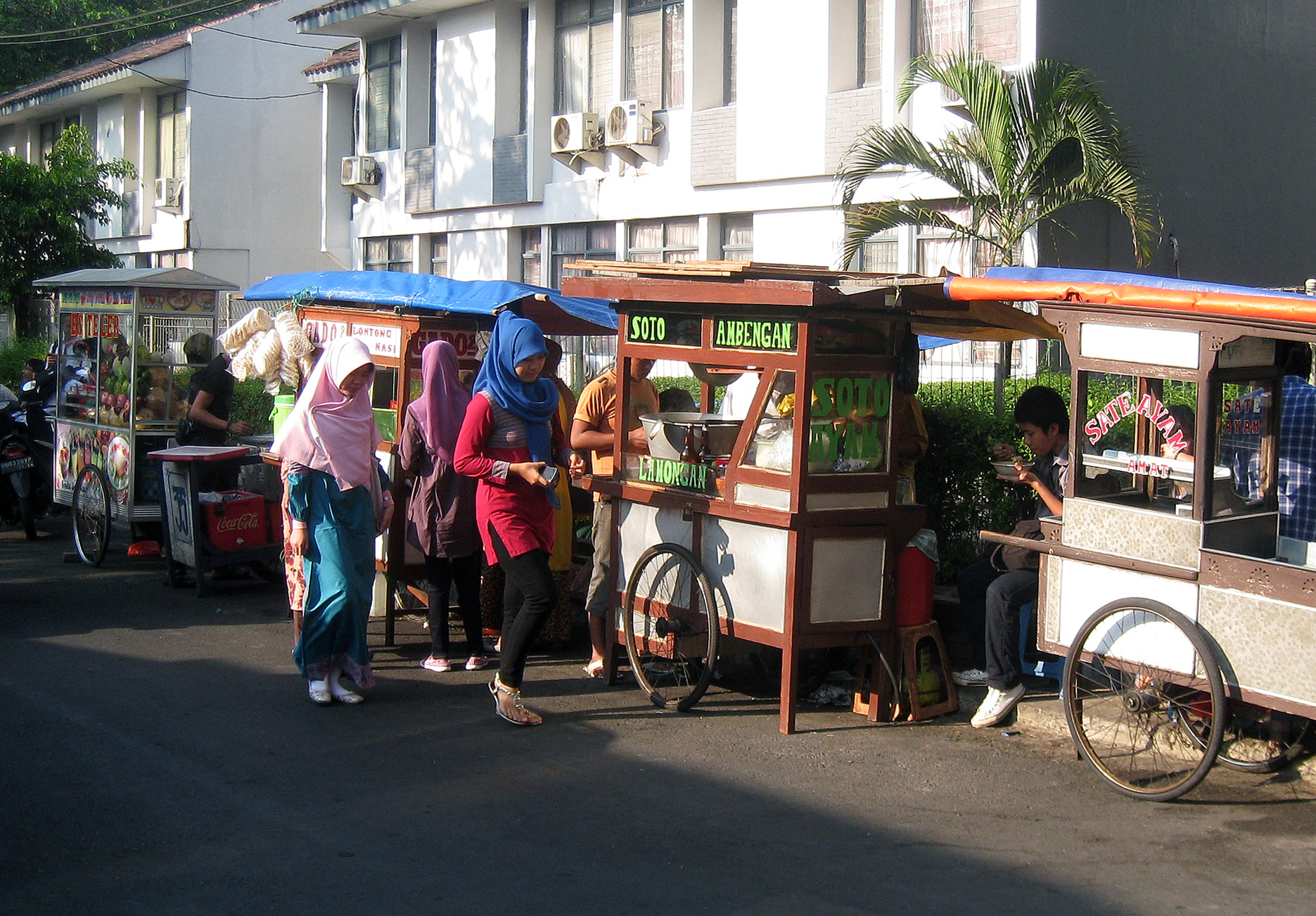
Traditional gerobak food carts lining Jakarta street, selling various Indonesian street foods.

Indonesian street food is a collection of ready-to-eat meals, snacks, fruits and drinks sold by hawkers or vendors at warung food stalls or food carts. Street food in Indonesia is a diverse mix of local Indonesian, Chinese, and Dutch influences. Indonesian street food is usually cheap, offers a great variety of food of different tastes, and can be found at every corner of the city.

Most Indonesian street food is affordable, with prices usually less than 1 US dollar (around 15,000.00 rupiah). However, there are also some street foods that are priced more than 20,000 rupiah (1.30 US dollar). Indonesian street food is often colloquially called as kaki lima (Indonesian for "five-feet") or jajanan kaki lima ("five-feet buys"), which refer to five foot way pedestrian pavements along the street that are often occupied by street hawkers selling food.

In 2015, the Cooperatives, Micro, Small and Medium Enterprises and Trade Agency recorded that Jakarta has around 56,000 street vendors and the spaces available for them reached just 18,000. The rest occupies the city's kaki lima pedestrian's pavements. The agency noted that the actual number is a lot bigger.

Indonesian street food often tastes rather strong and spicy. Much of the street food in Indonesia is fried, such as assorted gorengan (fritters), nasi goreng (fried rice), mie goreng (fried noodles), and ayam goreng (fried chicken), while bakso (meatball soup), traditional soto soups and fruit rujak are also popular. Most of Indonesian street food has something to do with peanut sauce; steamed siomay (fish dumplings), skewered and grilled chicken satay, asinan, ketoprak, and gado-gado (vegetable salad) are all served in peanut sauce. Some Indonesian street foods are often considered unhealthy due to heavy usage of deep frying techniques. Examples of such oily treats are gorengan fritters, telur gulung (rolled deep-fried egg), ayam goreng (fried chicken), and pecel lele (deep-fried catfish). However, with the recent development of Jakarta's street food scene, there have been efforts by vendors to offer more healthier options to cater to a more health-conscious clientèle.

== Characteristics ==
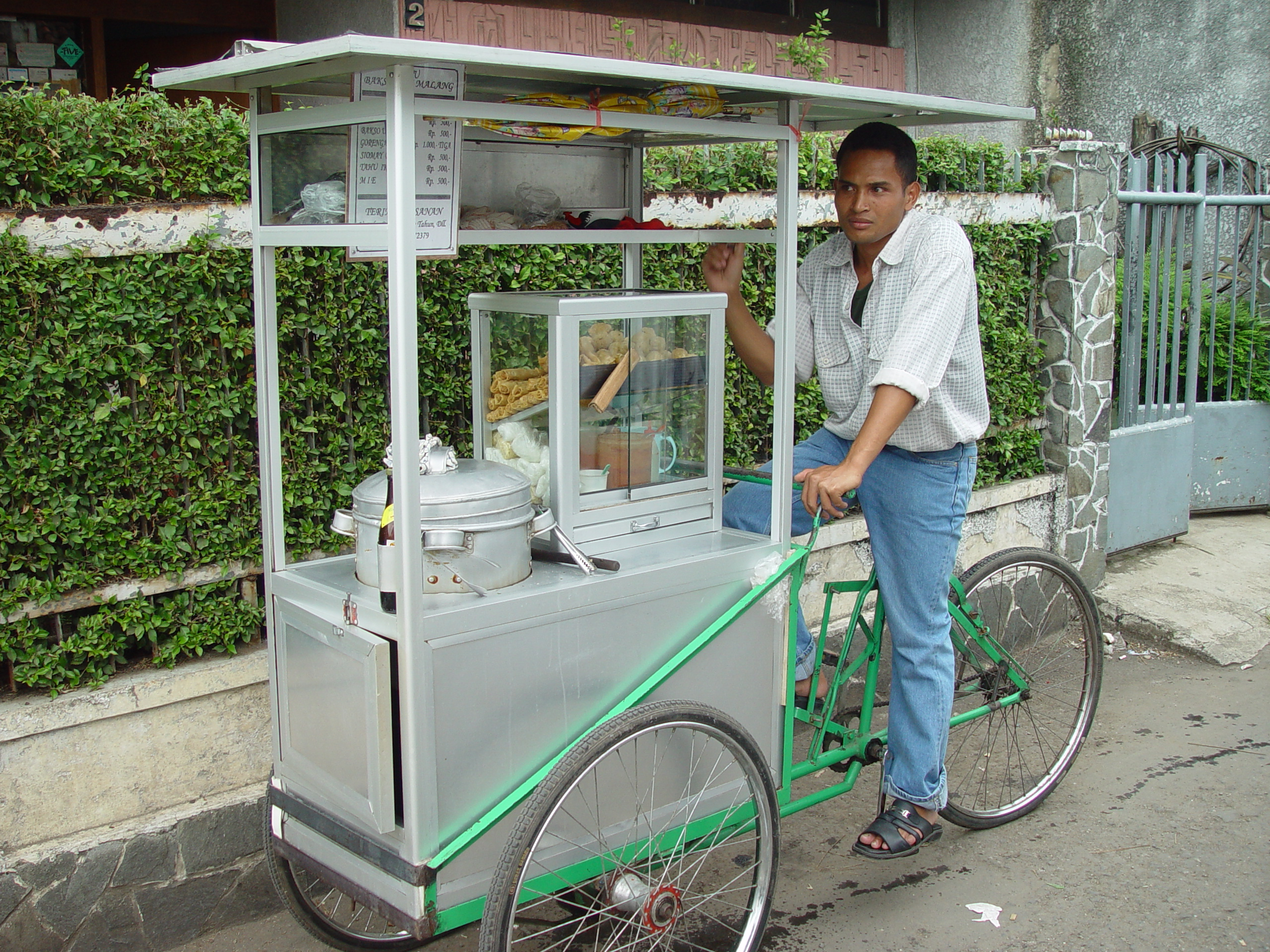
Bakso (meatball) seller on tricycle in Bandung

Street vendors are a common sight in Indonesian streets, in addition to hawkers peddling their goods on bicycles or carts. These carts are known as pedagang kaki lima —named after the five-foot-wide pavements that they occupy. Another popular theory suggests that the term kaki lima is also named after the sum of the feet; pushcarts with three feet (two wheels and a stabiliser wooden foot) and the two-footed vendors who push them.

=== Selling methods ===
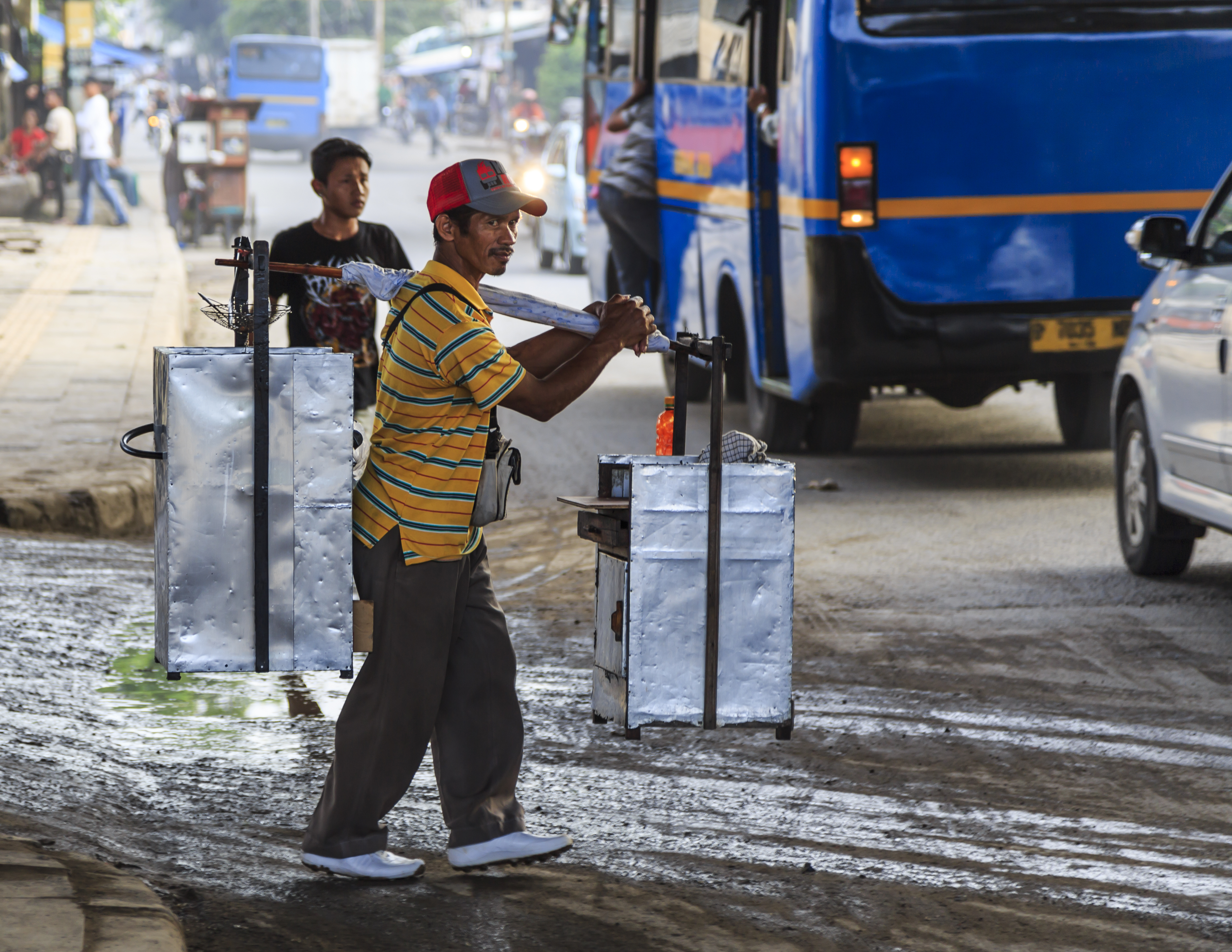
Bakso vendor using pikulan

There are two methods of street food selling in Indonesia: mobile (traveling) as a food cart and stationed, such as in a food booth. Food hawkers on pushcarts or bicycles might be travelling on streets, approaching potential buyers through frequenting residential areas whilst announcing their presence, or stationing themselves on the sides of packed and busy streets, setting up a warung (humble shop) under a small tarp tent and waiting for customers. Vendors often line busy roads during rush hour to offer their wares to hungry passersby in need of a snack, such as bakpau vendors lining Jakarta's gridlock traffic.

In Indonesia, there are many shapes and method of food peddlers, including pikulan which is the seller carrying things using a rod; gerobak, a wheeled food pushcart; and sepeda using a bicycle or a tricycle; a hybrid between a cart and a bicycle. In Indonesia, traditionally there are several types and methods on selling street food, they are:

- Pikulan: The pikulan is more precisely describes as a carrying method by balancing two wooden baskets or cabinets using a pole or a rod on one's shoulder. The oldest image of pikulan carrying method can be found in 9th century Borobudur bas relief. It is the most traditional way of selling satay, as it appear in early photographs of Java in late 19th century shows the travelling satay vendor using this pikulan which resembles two small wooden cabinets carried with a rod made of either bamboo, wood or rattan.

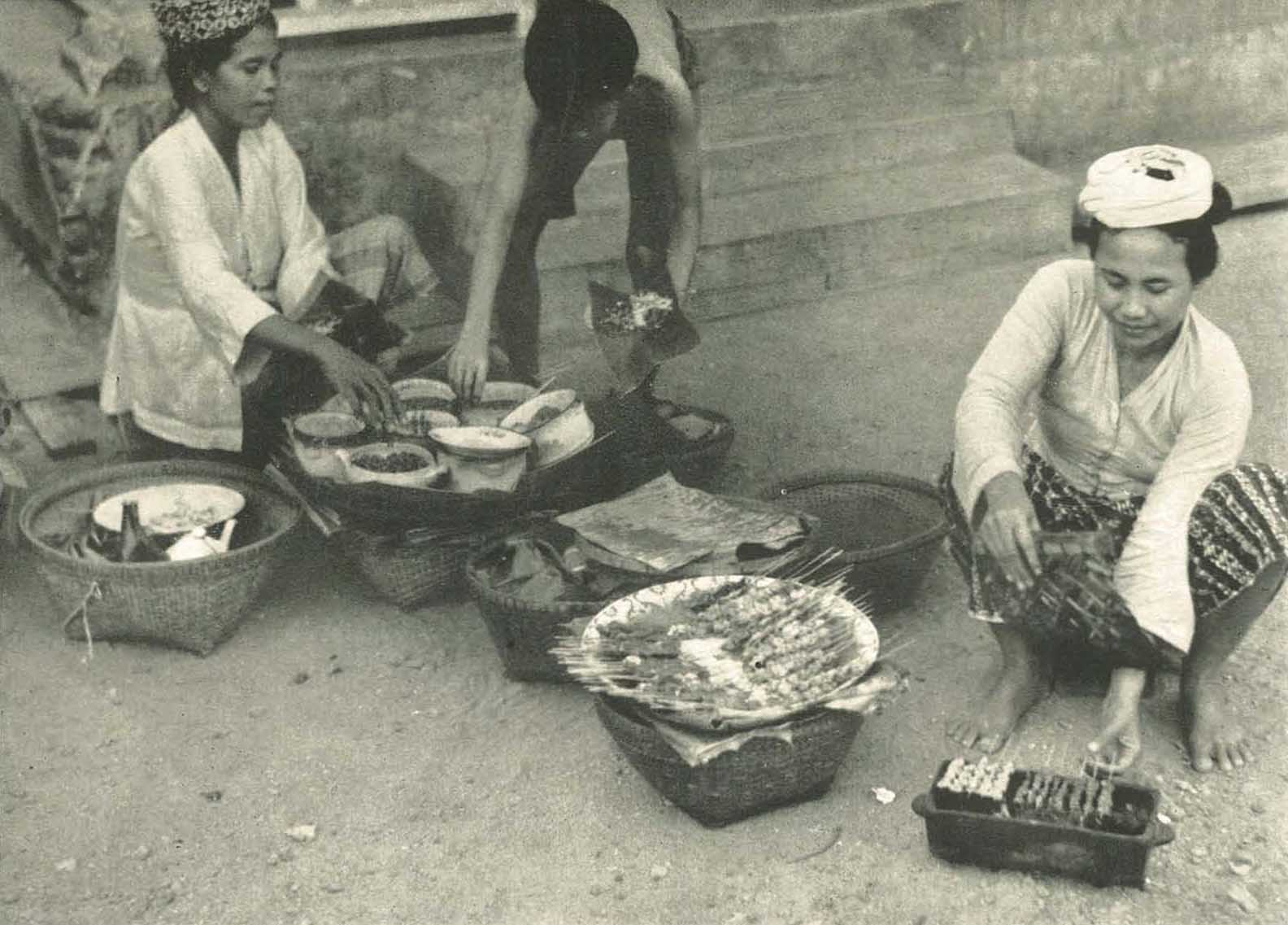
Sunggi or bakul satay seller ladies grilling satay in Lombok

- Sunggi and Bakul: In Javanese, sunggi means carrying things upon one's head using some kind of tampah tray or platter. While bakul in Javanese refer to weaved bamboo wicker container. This practice is quite common in today's Bali, Lombok and rural Java. The sunggi satay vendors — usually women — carry raw satays, lontongs, peanut sauce upon the wooden tray on their head, while carrying baskets containing grill, charcoal, bamboo fan, sweet soy sauce bottle, and wooden small short chair called dingklik. The satay seller ladies may ambulating residential areas or positioned their wares in busy areas (e.g. marketplace or tourism area), and grill the satay per customer's order. The sunggi overhead tray is often used by various travelling traditional kue sellers. While bakul is common method uses by jamu herbal medicine seller.
- Gerobak: In Indonesian, gerobak means wheeled food cart. It is one of the common method of selling street food by travelling vendors. The food gerobak or Indonesian food pushcarts mostly has similar size and design, yet they are distinctive depends to the type of food being sold. They look like a wheeled portable cupboard with drawers and glass cabinet to store and display ingredients. Some are completed with a small LPG-fuelled stove; bakso pushcart usually has a large aluminium cauldron or pot to boil the meatballs and to contain the broth, while siomay one has a steamer pot, nasi goreng and mie goreng seller has a wok on strong-fired stove, while satay cart has a rectangular charcoal-fuelled barbecue grill instead. These food pushcarts or tricycles might be constructed from a wooden or metal frame, completed with glass windows and aluminium or tin coating.
- Sepeda and Becak: In Indonesian, sepeda means bicycle, while becak means cycle rickshaw. Siomay fish dumpling might used bicycle to get around busy spots and residential areas to sell their wares. The gerobak could be a pushcart or attached to a paddled bicycle, forming a tricycle or a becak-like cycle rickshaw. In some instance, bicycle may be replaced by motorcycle.
- Warung: In Indonesian, warung means modest shop, selling foods or other things. The most common street food warung usually are warung tenda, modest tarp-tent shop stationed in busy street side to await customers. Nevertheless, modest shops and restaurants attached to the front of the house is also called warung.

=== Announcement ===
These food peddlers may frequent residential areas to serve potential customers in households in the area. Many of them have their own distinctive call or songs to announce their wares. For example, a satay seller would have a distinctive tééé satééé yell, the bakso seller would hit wooden kentongan slit drum, bubur ayam seller would hit the side of a soup bowl, whereas mie ayam is announced by hitting a wood block.

== History ==
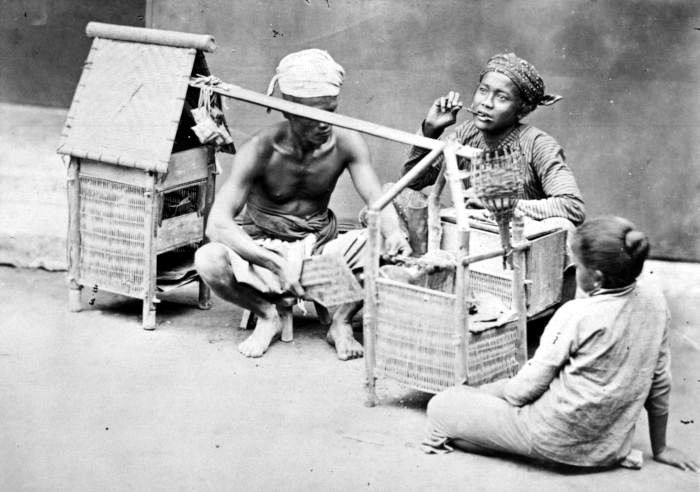
Satay seller in Java, c. 1870, using pikulan or carrying baskets using a rod.

Street food has a long history in Indonesian tradition. Some panels of bas-relief on Borobudur describes travelling food and drink vendor, suggesting that the small scale food entrepreneurship has been established in ancient Java as early as 9th century. The inscriptions dated from Majapahit period circa 14th century also describes food and drink vendor as one of line of works in Javanese society.

The influences of Chinese street food culture is also visible in Indonesia as early as Dutch colonial era. Numbers of Chinese origin dishes such as various noodles, bakso meatballs, lumpia spring rolls, dumplings and Chinese steamed buns (bakpao) are common in Indonesian urban areas. Numbers of local Indonesian dishes has also become the source of street food variants, as well as foreign influences. Satay for example, is believed started as a street food in the early 19th century, as a local Javanese adaptation of Indian kebabs. On the other hand, Dutch influence is also visible in Indonesian street food scene, especially in cakes, pastry and cookies. School kids' favourite kue cubit for example, is a local derivation of Dutch poffertjes.

The current proliferation of Indonesia's vigorous street food culture, is also contributed by its demographic condition; the massive urbanisation in recent decades. This took place especially in the country's rapidly expanding urban agglomerations in Greater Jakarta, Surabaya, Bandung, Medan, Palembang, Denpasar, and Makassar. The rapid urban growth in recent decades has opened opportunities in foodservice sectors. As large numbers of rural population flocked to Indonesia's urban centers, many of them established a street food business. Today, it is easy to find a diverse collection of street food selling dishes from all over Indonesian archipelago; from Madura to Padang satays, from bakso Malang to siomay Bandung.

In recent years, several new foreign influences also has enrichen Indonesian street food scene. They came from Western influences (especially United States), also from Japan and the Middle East. For example, today it is common to find hamburger, hot dog and sosis bakar (grilled Bratwurst sausages) food carts next to traditional bakso meatball pushcart in marketplaces. Street side Turkish kebabs and Japanese takoyaki food stalls also might be found, although they might not be authentic, because of the difficulties to acquire required imported ingredients, plus cheaper price range in Indonesian street food market. The taste also might has been altered to suit local's preferences, such as the addition of hot and spicy sambal chili sauce.

== Types ==
=== Dishes ===
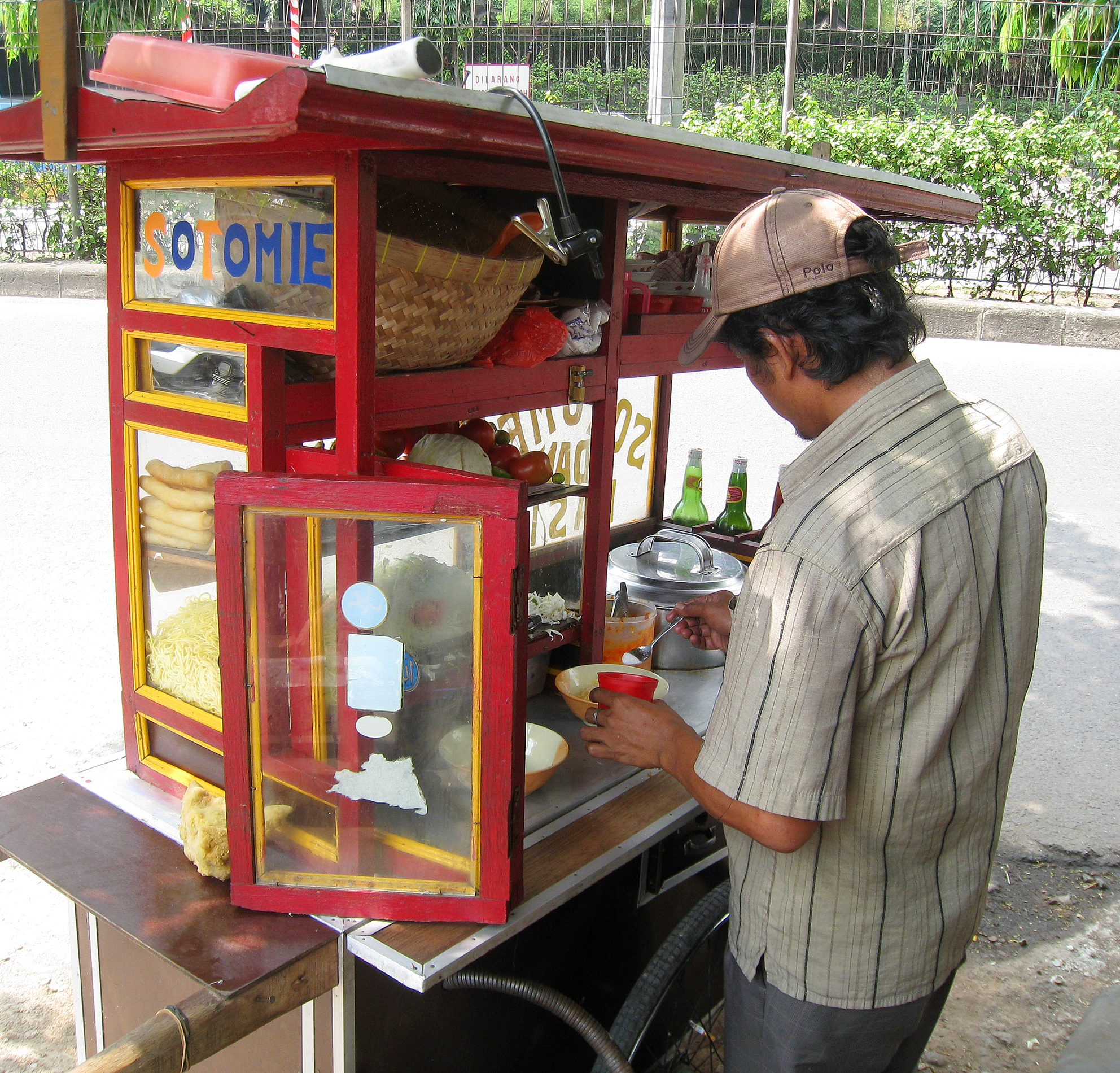
Soto mie cart street vendor

Many Indonesian street foods consist of a single meal, which is prepared, composed, mixed or heated in front of the customers per order. In most cities, it is common to see Chinese dishes such as bakmie or mie ayam (chicken noodles) and bakso (meatballs) sold by street vendors and food stalls, often adapted to become Indonesian-Chinese cuisine. One common adaptation is that pork is rarely used since the majority of Indonesians are Muslims. Other popular Indonesian street food and snacks are siomay and batagor (abbreviated from Bakso Tahu Goreng), pempek (deep fried fish cake), bubur ayam (chicken congee), bubur kacang hijau (mung beans porridge), satay, nasi goreng (English: fried rice), soto mie (soto noodle), mie ayam (chicken noodle) and mie goreng (fried noodle), tauge goreng (mung bean sprouts and noodle salad), asinan (preserved vegetables or fruits salad), laksa, kerak telor (spicy omelette) and seblak.

=== Snacks ===
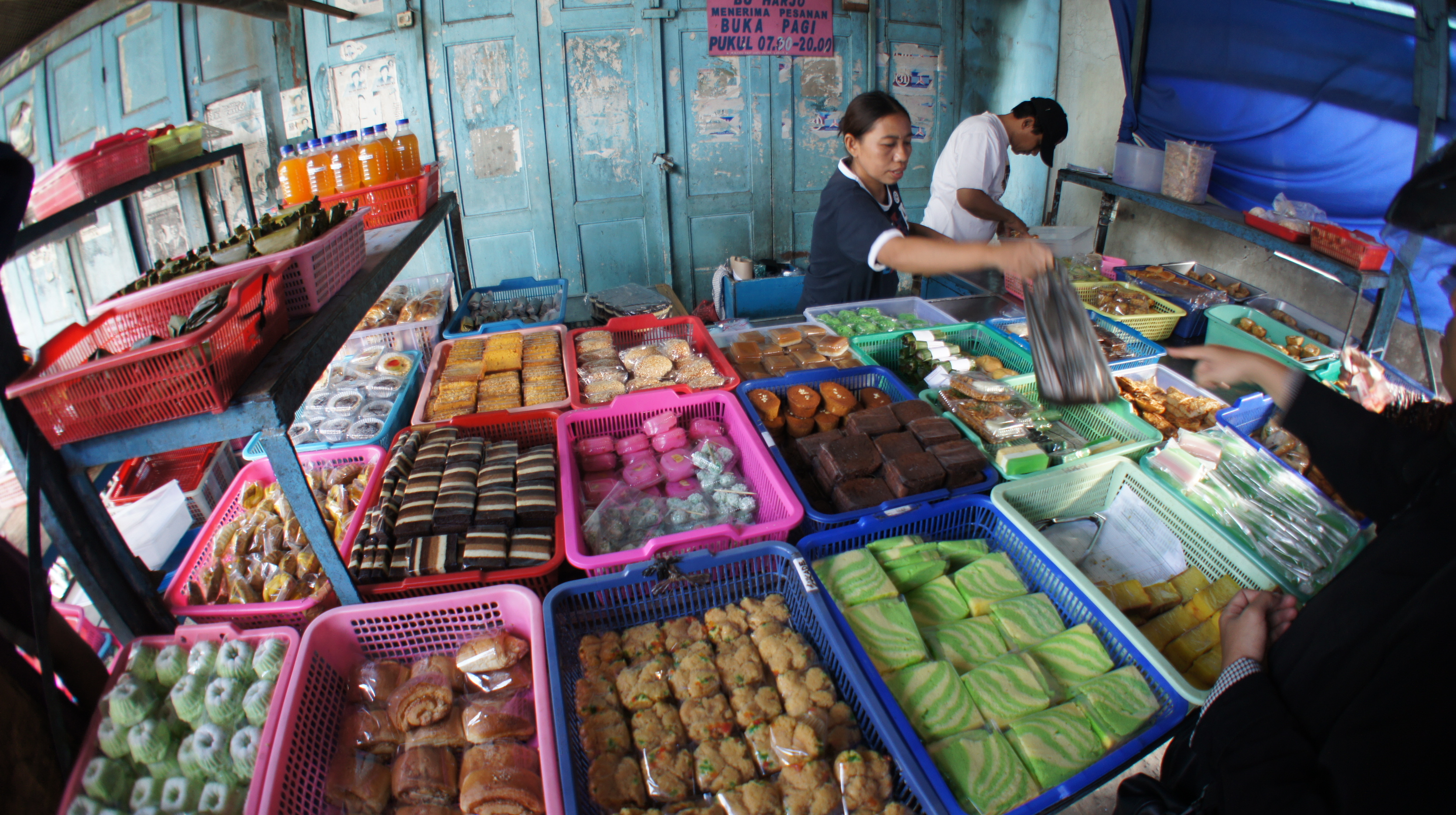
Traditional market in Yogyakarta selling various kinds of kue jajan pasar.

Indonesian traditional cakes and cookies are collectively called as kue, and the assorted collection of kue sold in marketplace are often called jajanan pasar (market munchies). Other street snacks include selection of pancakes such as kue ape and serabi. It is also common to find Chinese snack, such as bakpao (steamed buns with sweet and savoury fillings). Indonesian street side snacks includes gorengan (Indonesian assorted fritters) which includes fried tempeh and oncom, tahu goreng (fried tofu), pisang goreng (fried banana), ubi goreng (fried sweet potato) and bakwan (fried dish of beansprouts and batter).

=== Beverages ===
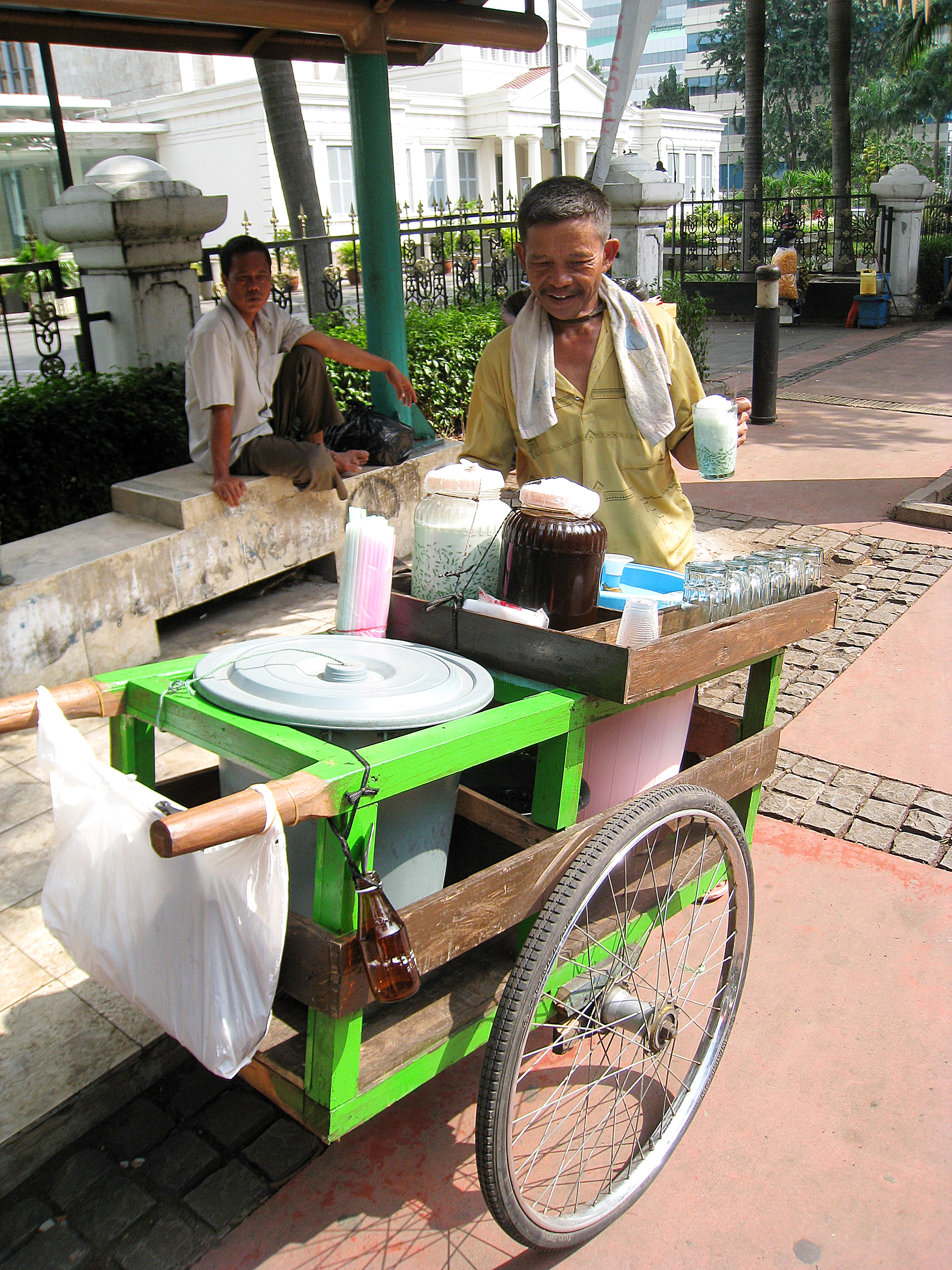
Roadside cendol vendor in Jakarta.

The traditional drinks lahang (sugar palm sap) and tuak (palm wine), are among the oldest street drinks sold by street peddler using large bamboo tubes as liquid container. Indonesian street beverages include iced and sweet beverages, such as es cendol or es dawet, es teler, es cincau, es doger, es campur, es potong, and es puter. These beverages are more a dessert; a cocktail of fruit and snacks rather than a drink, since other than shaved ice it contains many ingredients including fruit bits, tapioca pearls, grass jelly, etc.

Fruit juices (jus) are very popular. Varieties include orange (jus jeruk), guava (jus jambu), mango (jus mangga), soursop (jus sirsak) and avocado (jus alpokat), the last of these being commonly served with condensed milk and chocolate syrup as a dessert-like treat. Durian can be made into ice cream called es durian.

== Issues ==
=== Hygiene ===
While most of Indonesian food products served in mid to upperscale eating establishments maintain food hygiene standard ranges from good to acceptable — regulated and supervised by Badan Pengawasan Obat dan Makanan (Indonesian Food and Drug Administration) — some warung traditional foodstalls and street vendors might have poor hygiene and low nutritional value. Hygiene remains a problem for pavement dining as clean dish washing is seldom practised due to a lack of running water.

The tropical microbes also might contribute to food poisoning cases, especially among foreigners during their stay in Indonesia. It is advisable to choose cooked hot food instead of uncooked room temperatured ones sold by street vendors. For example, when consuming food sold by street vendors, consuming hot cooked mie ayam or hot soto soup is much safer than having cold and raw karedok, gado-gado salad or fruit rujak.

=== City order ===
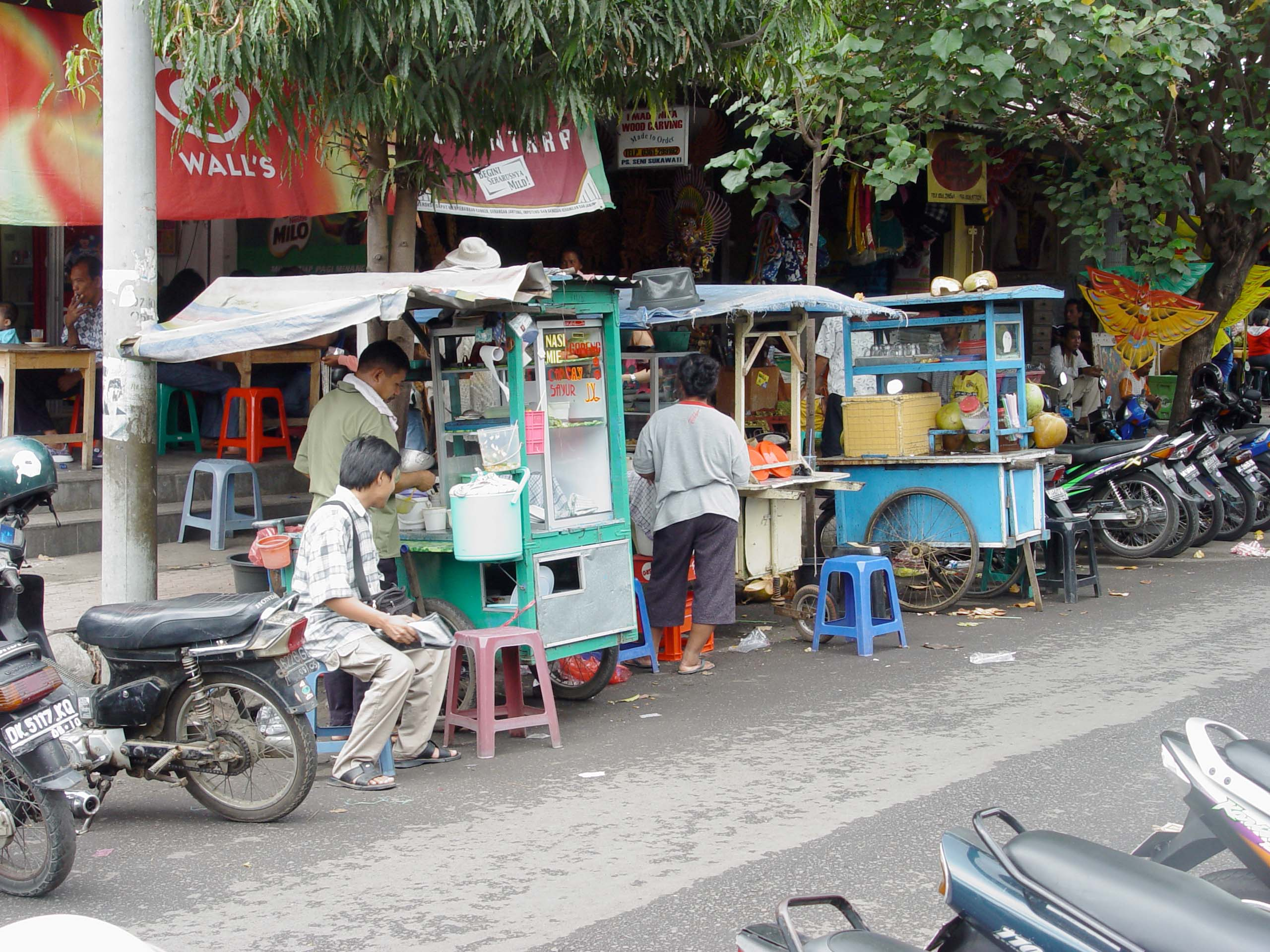
Street food often undermined city order, as the carts lined along street side or occupying pedestrian path

Today, it is easy to find large numbers of tarp tented warung food stalls and gerobak foodcarts occupying and clogging the kaki lima pedestrian pavements in Indonesian cities. This might cause walking on the street, especially in Jakarta, is unpleasant and potentially dangerous, as pedestrians are forced to walk on the motorways as the pavements are occupied by street vendors.

Historically, the island of Java has been well populated; restaurant and street food businesses has been part of its society. Nevertheless, it was the massive urbanisation which started in the 1960s that shaped the street food culture of Indonesian cities. As more and more people flock from rural areas into urban centers, new jobs are required. Many of the rural-origin workforce are low-skilled and low-educated, thus most of them are absorbed in informal economic activities including street food business. Some of them try their luck to sell the delicacies from their hometown by establishing restaurants, warungs, foodstalls, or travelling foodcarts. That is why in urban centers like Greater Jakarta, one easily discovers various dishes, traditional food and delicacies coming from all over the Indonesian archipelago. From gado-gado Jakarta, asinan Bogor, bakso Malang, sate Madura, sate Padang, pempek Palembang to siomay Bandung.

Nevertheless, the tremendous occupation of pavements by the kaki lima vendors, including street food sellers, has led to other urban and societal problems. As municipal authorities try to free the pedestrian's pavements and ease the congestion on the street, numbers of disputes erupt between city authorities and street vendors (Indonesian: Pedagang Kaki Lima or PKL). This led to the call for city administration to regulate street food vendors in their area.

== Gallery ==
Indonesian Street Food

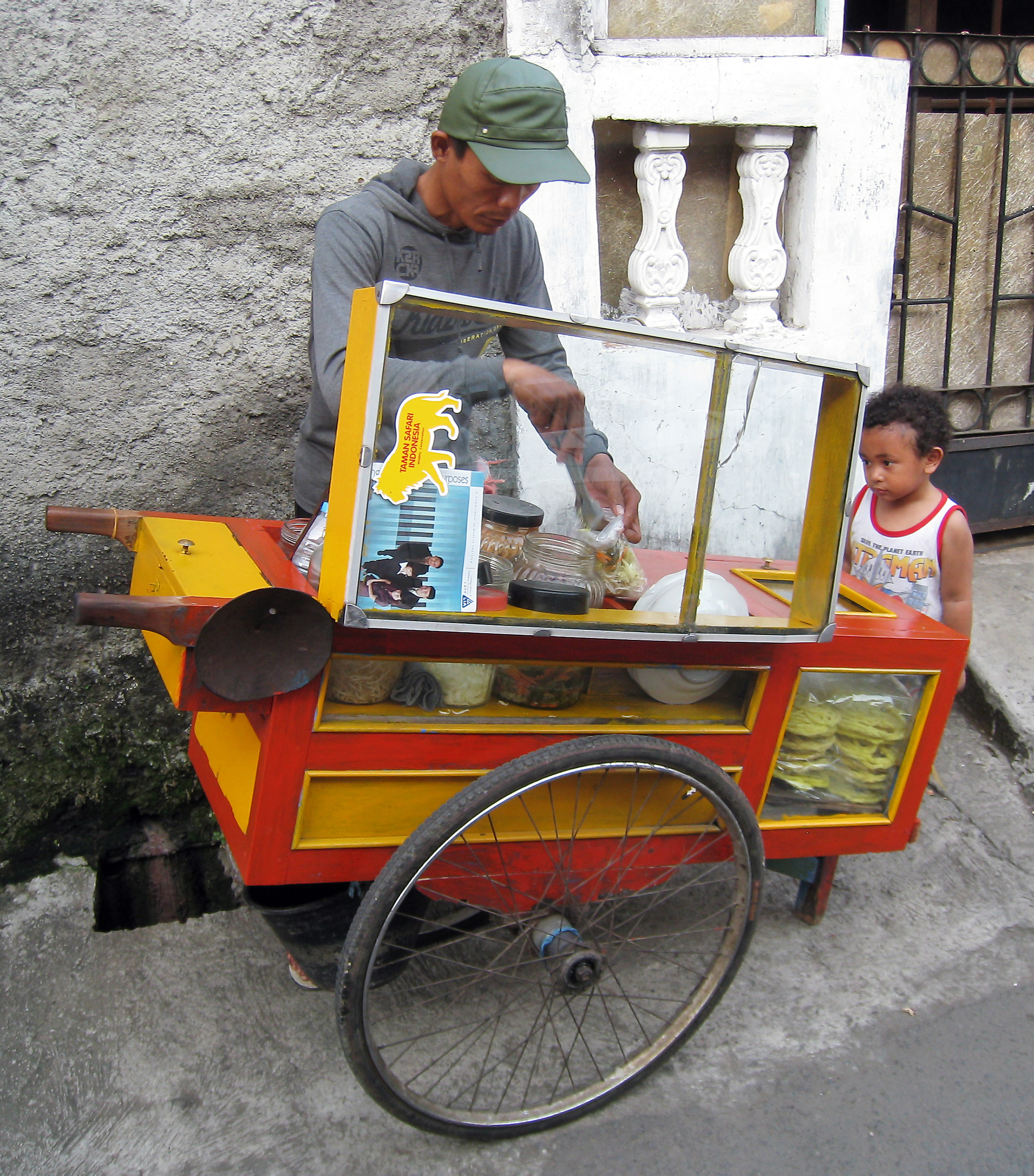
Asinan

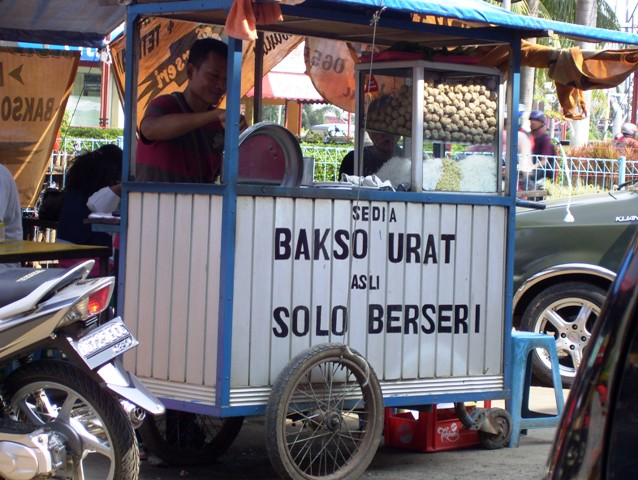
Bakso

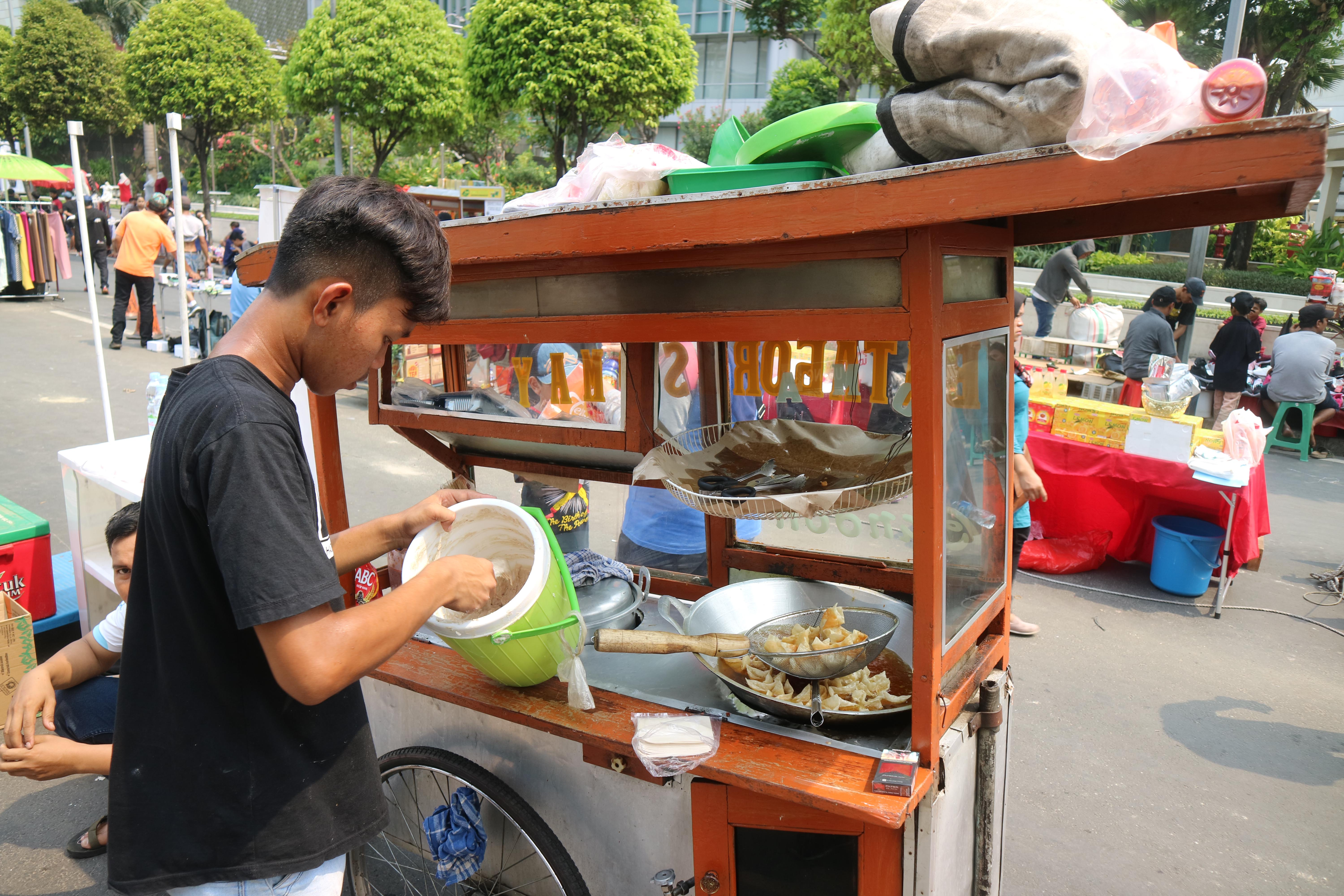
Batagor

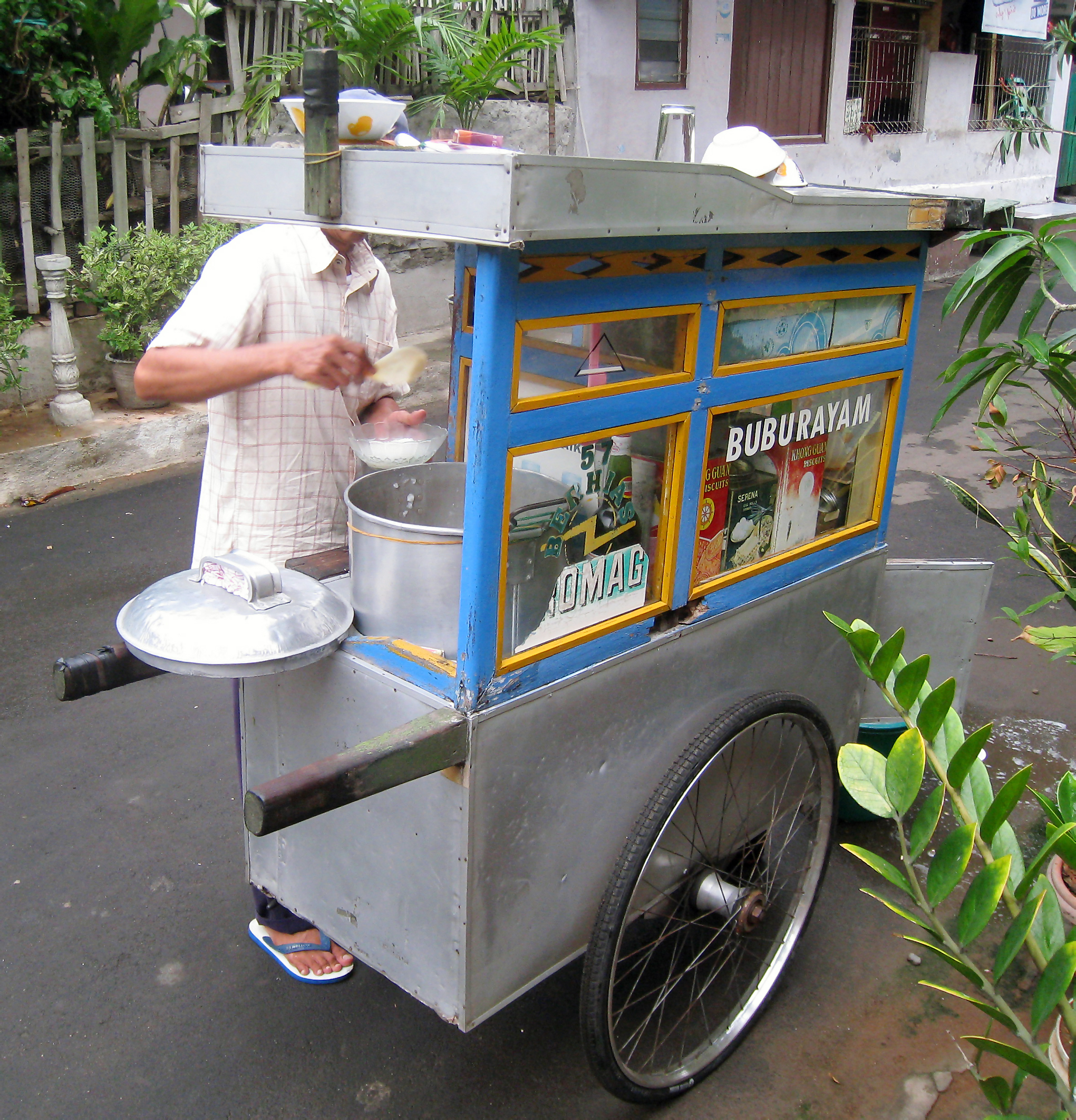
Bubur ayam

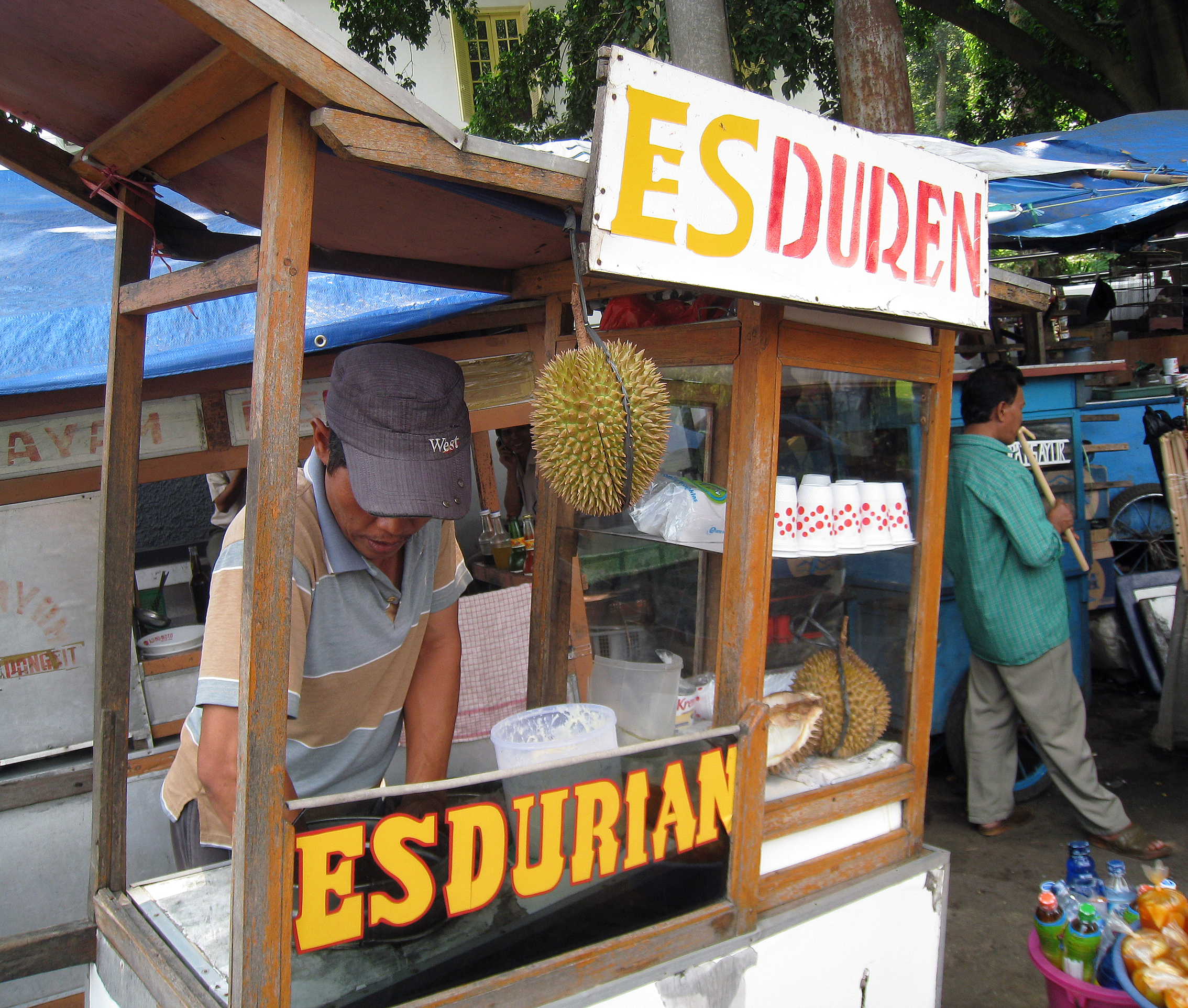
Es durian

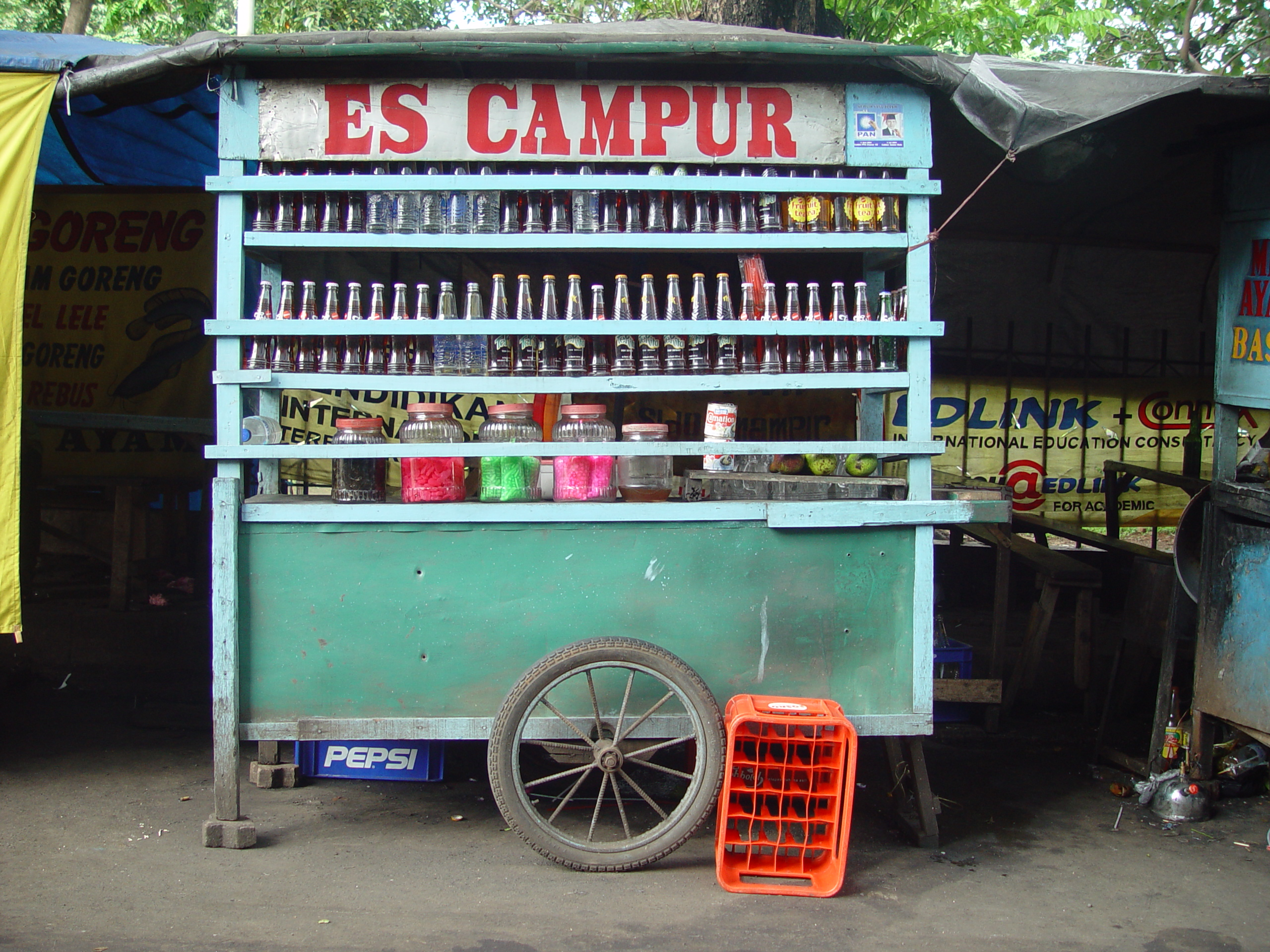
Es campur

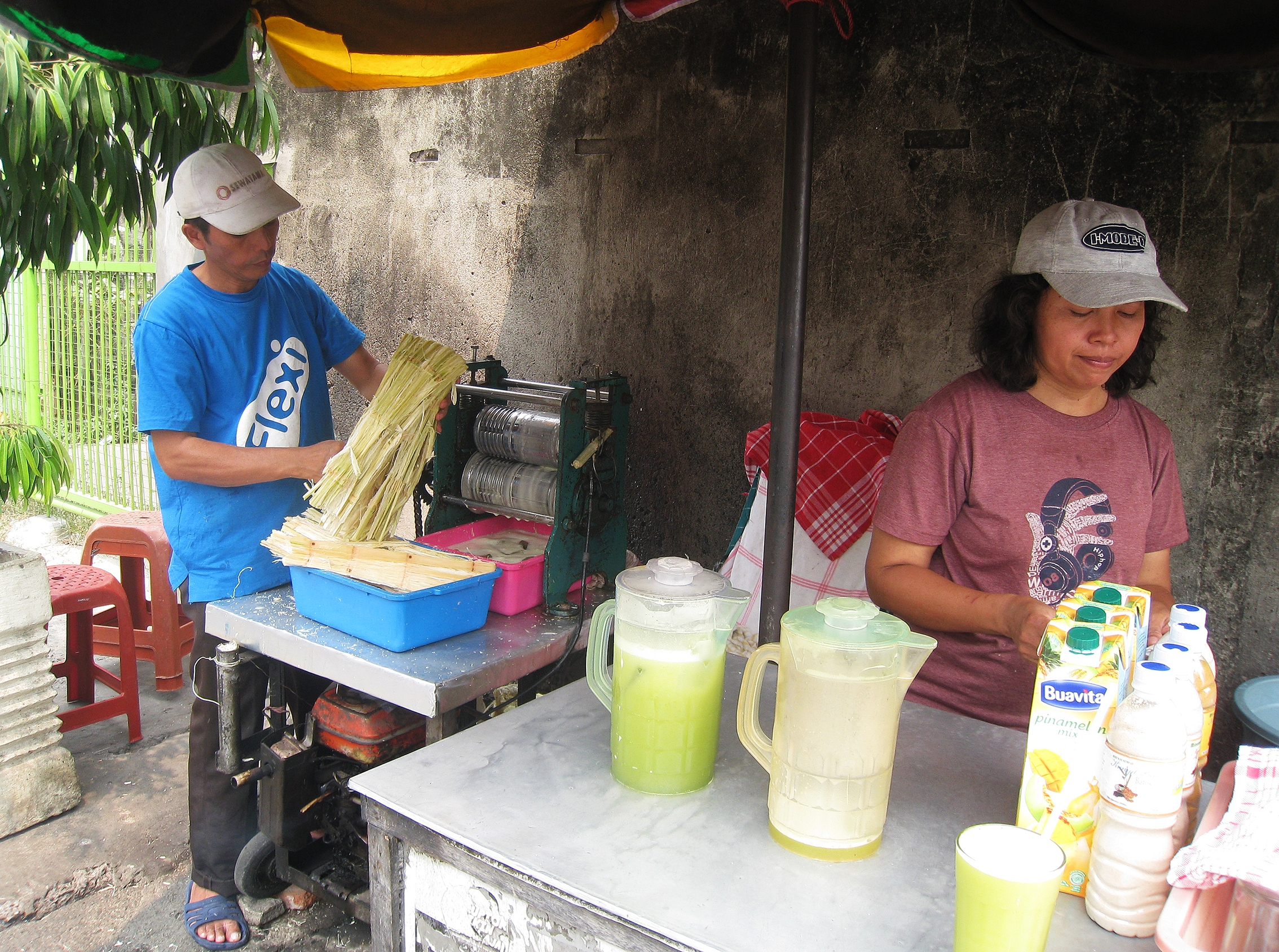
Es tebu

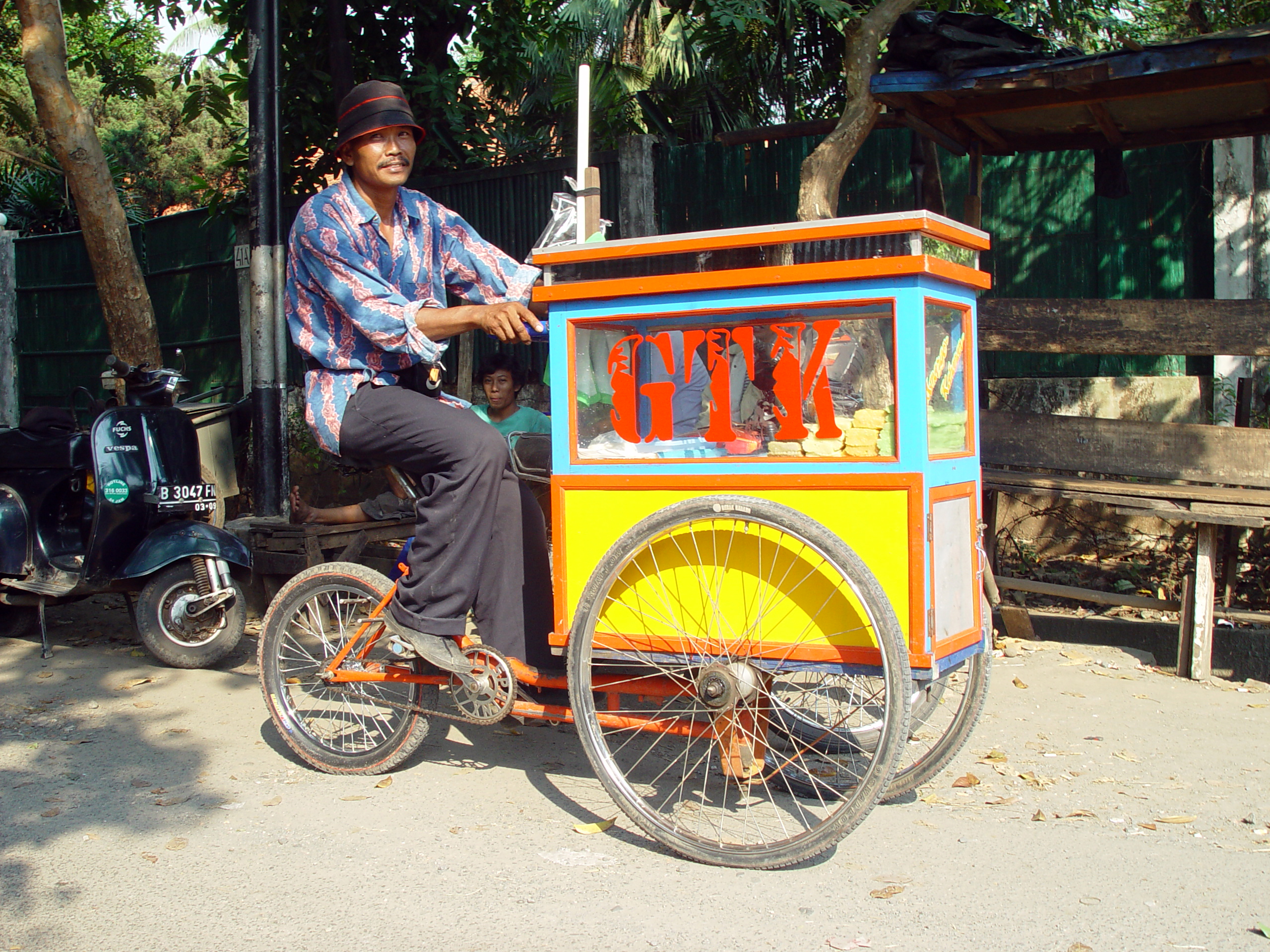
Getuk

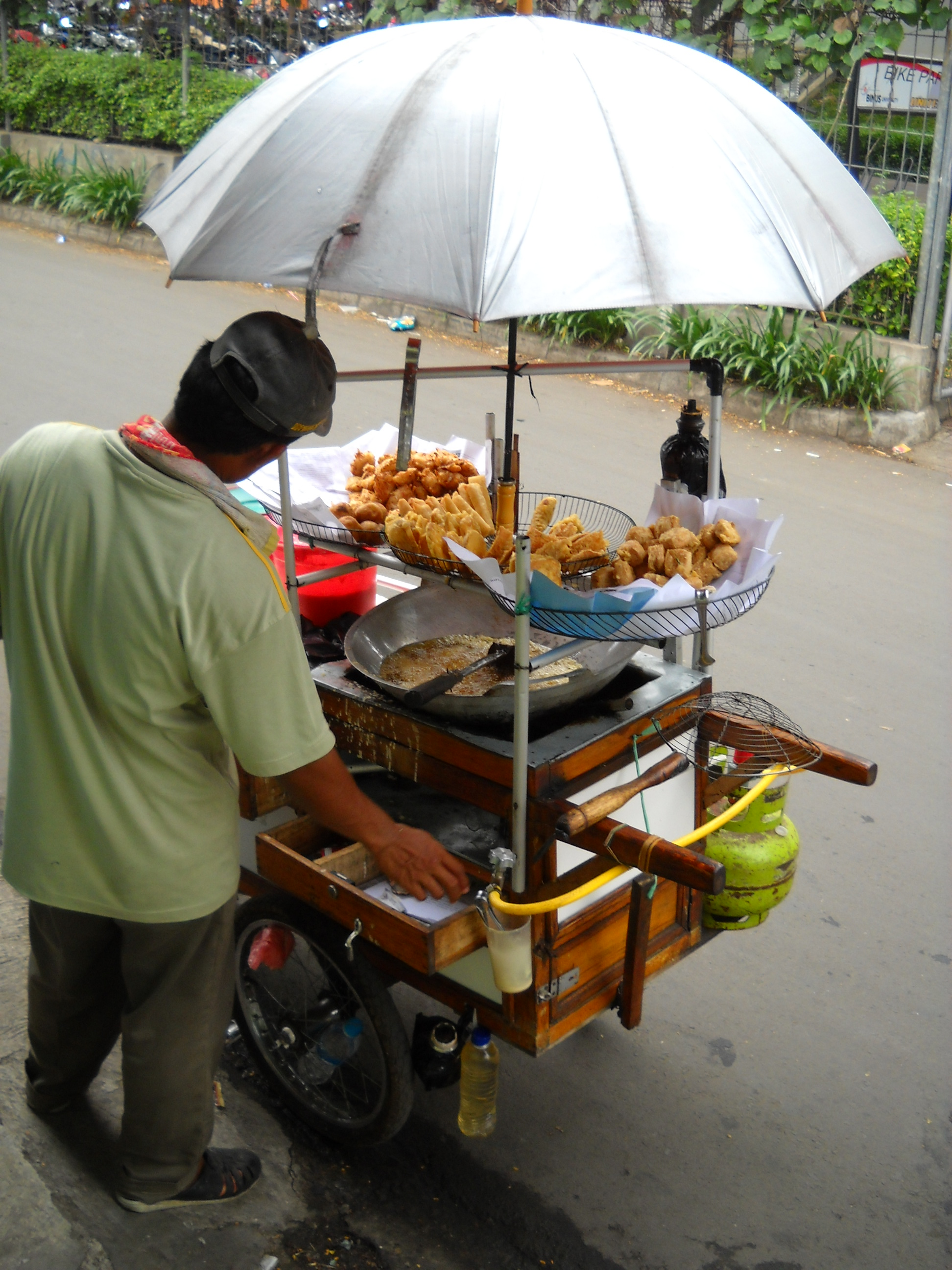
Gorengan

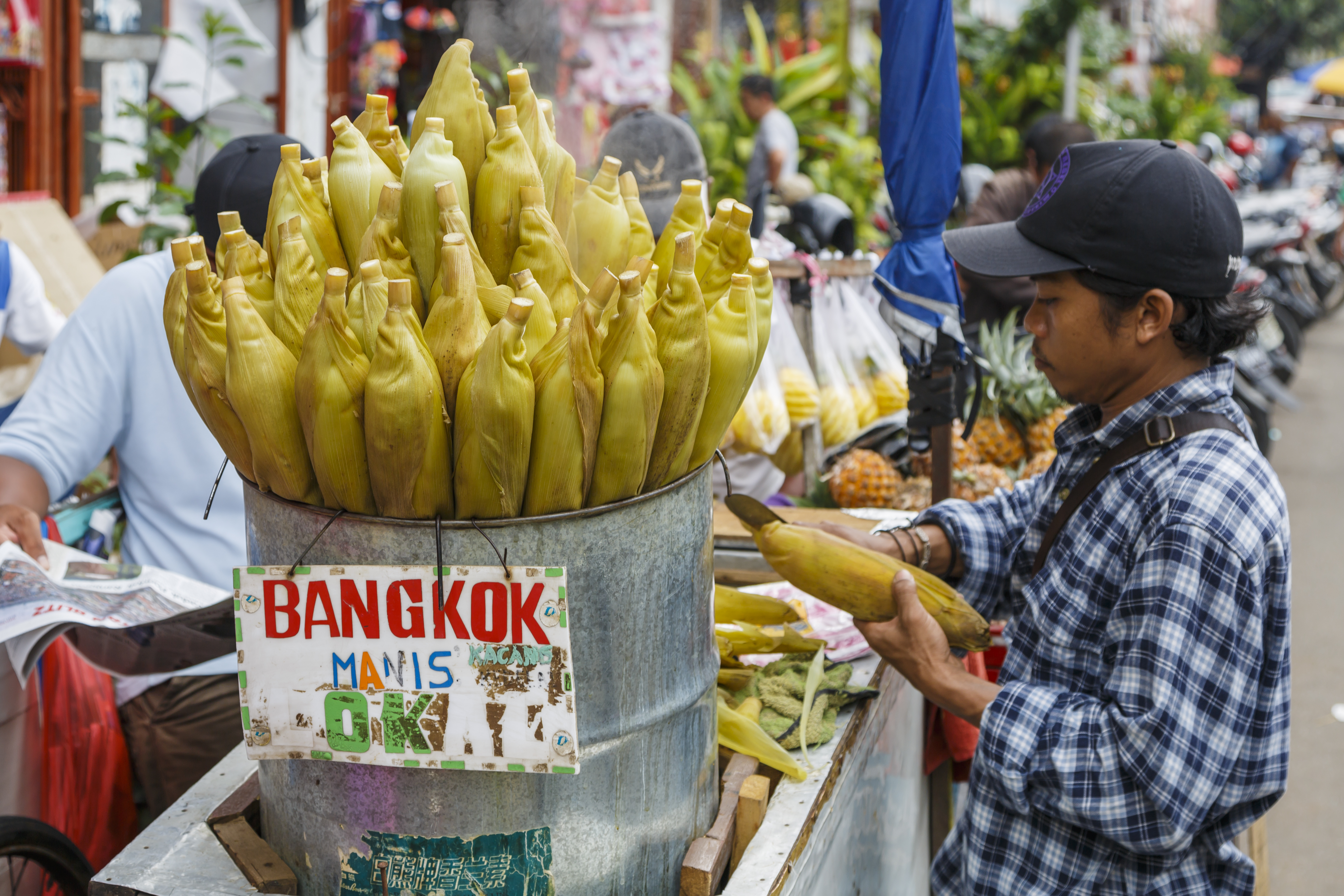
Jagung rebus

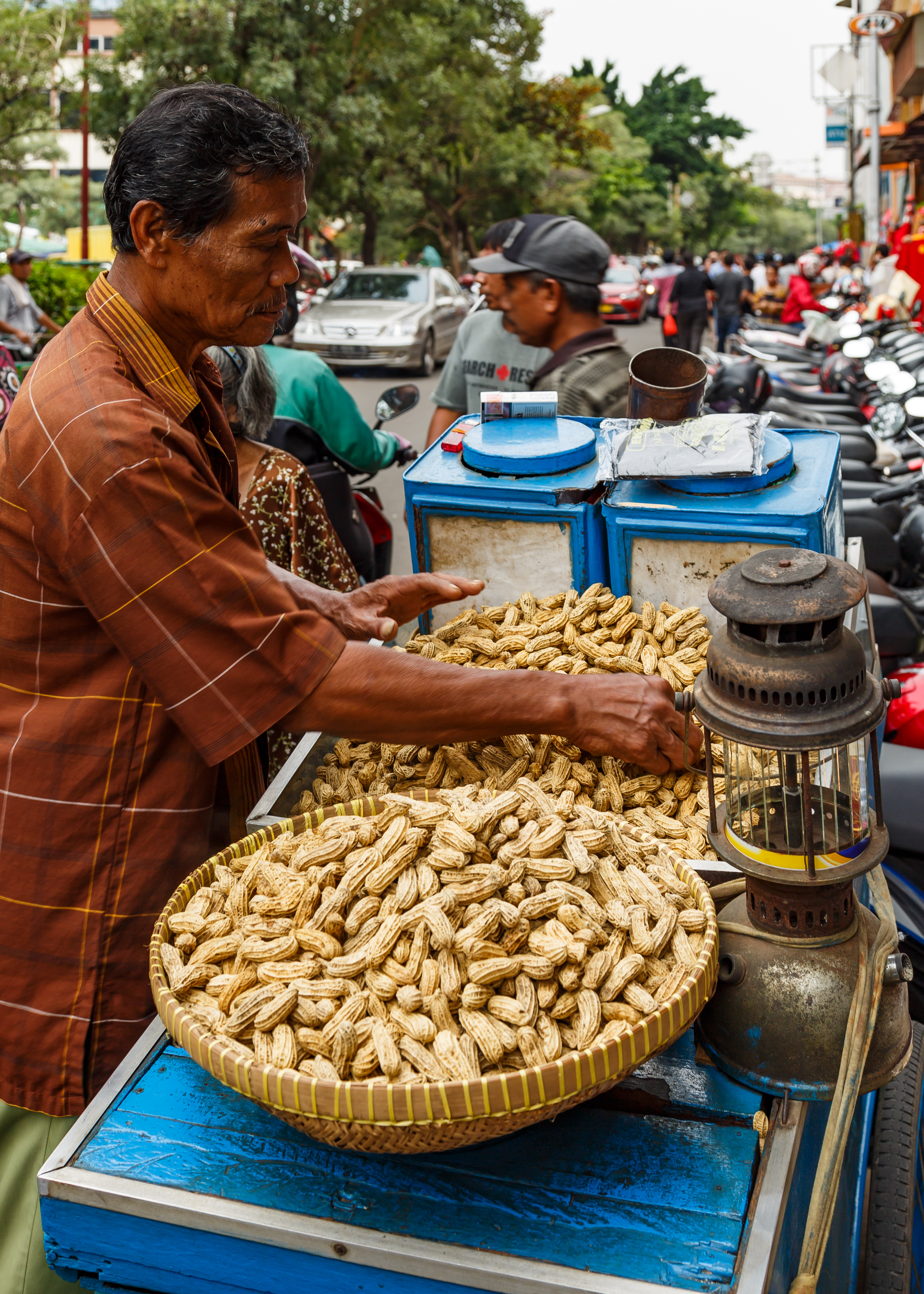
Kacang rebus

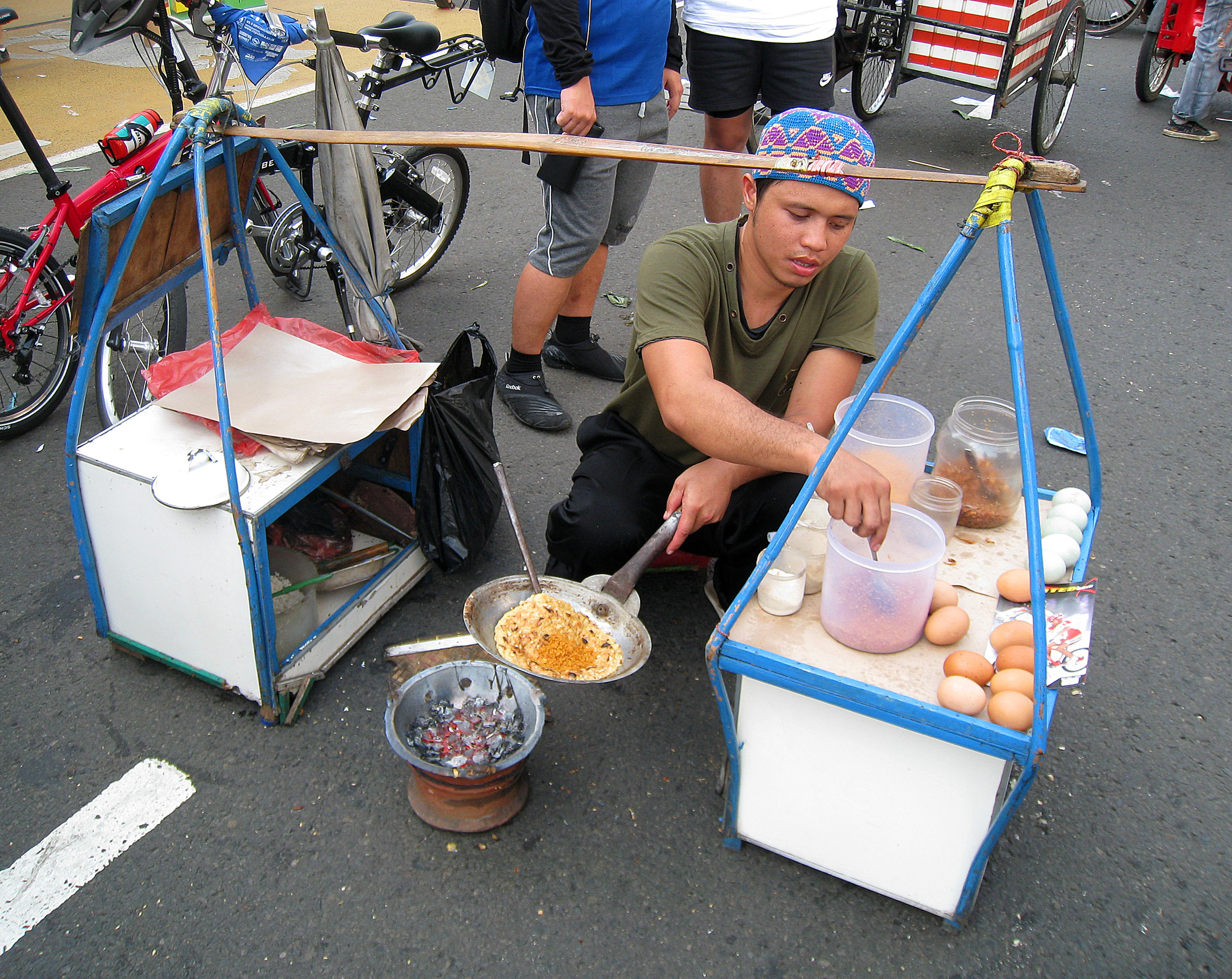
Kerak telor

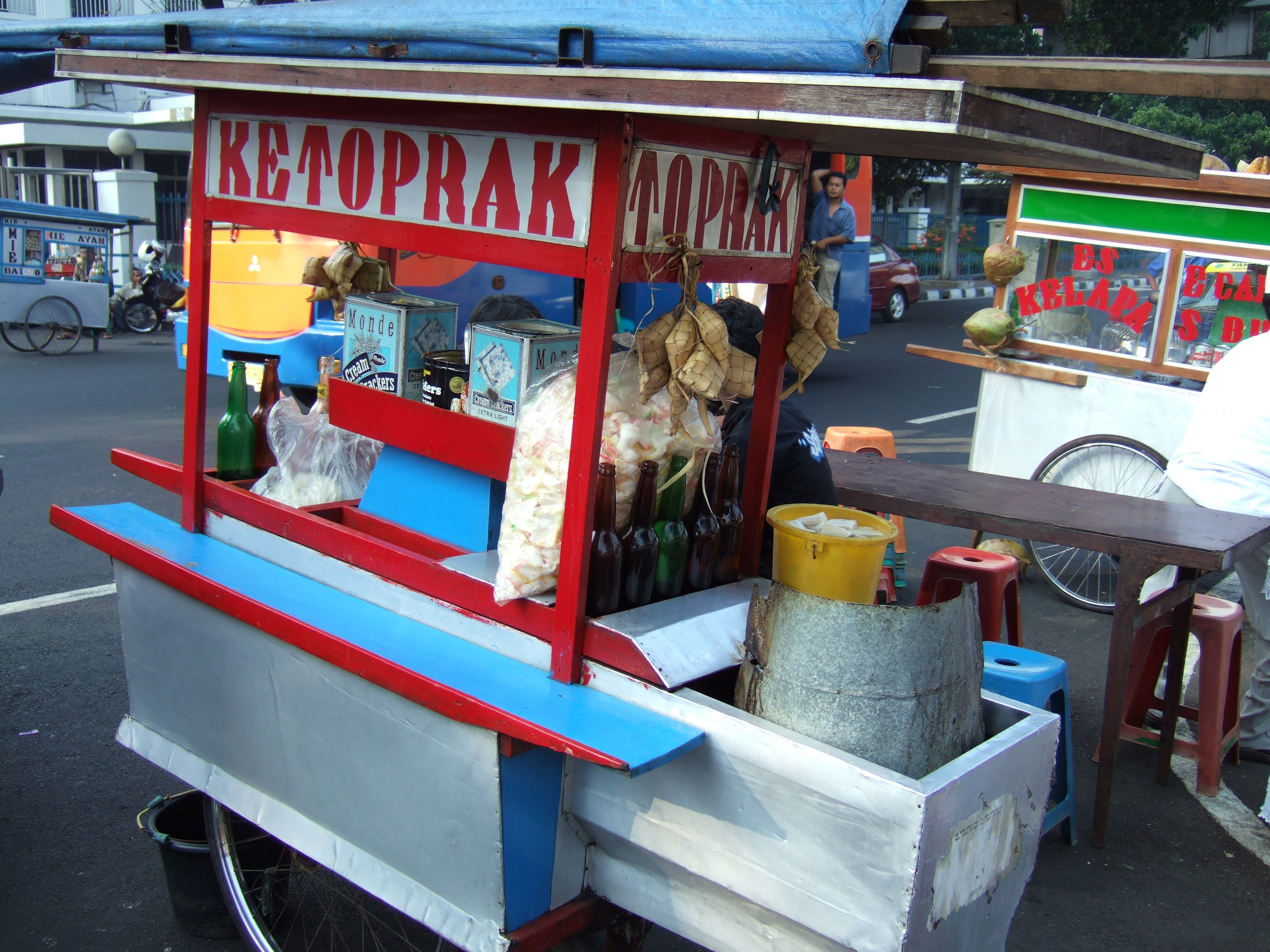
Ketoprak

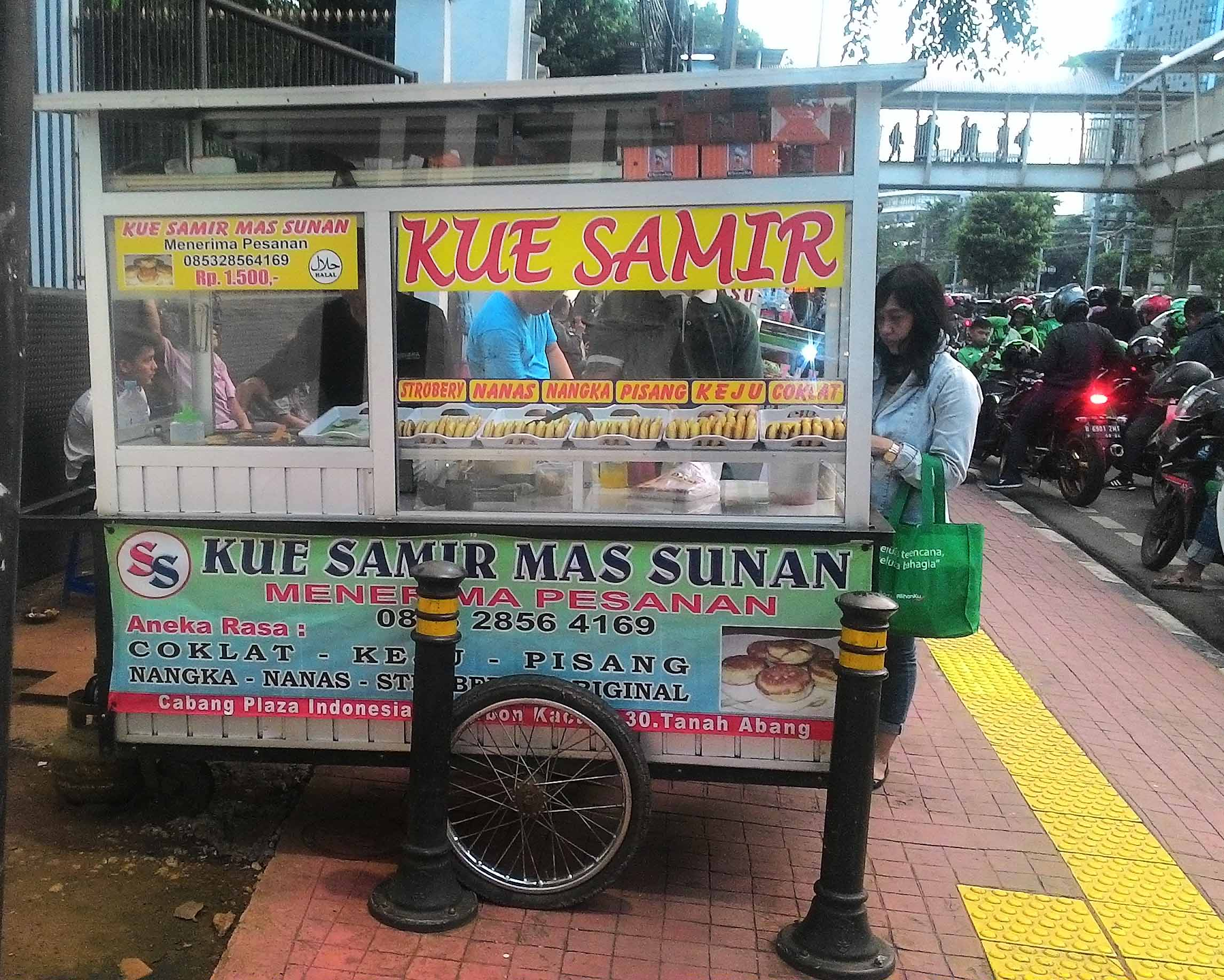
Kue samir

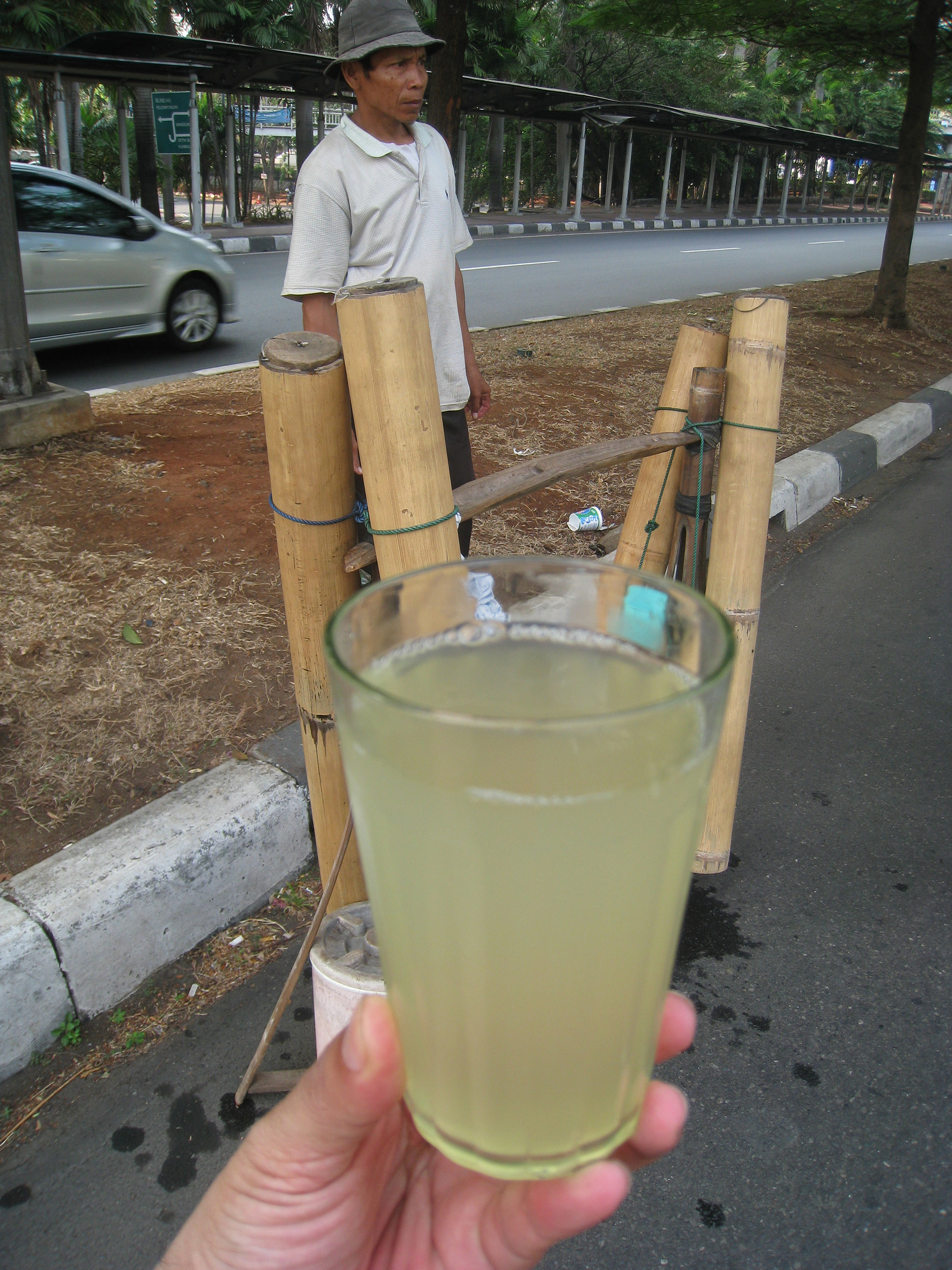
Lahang

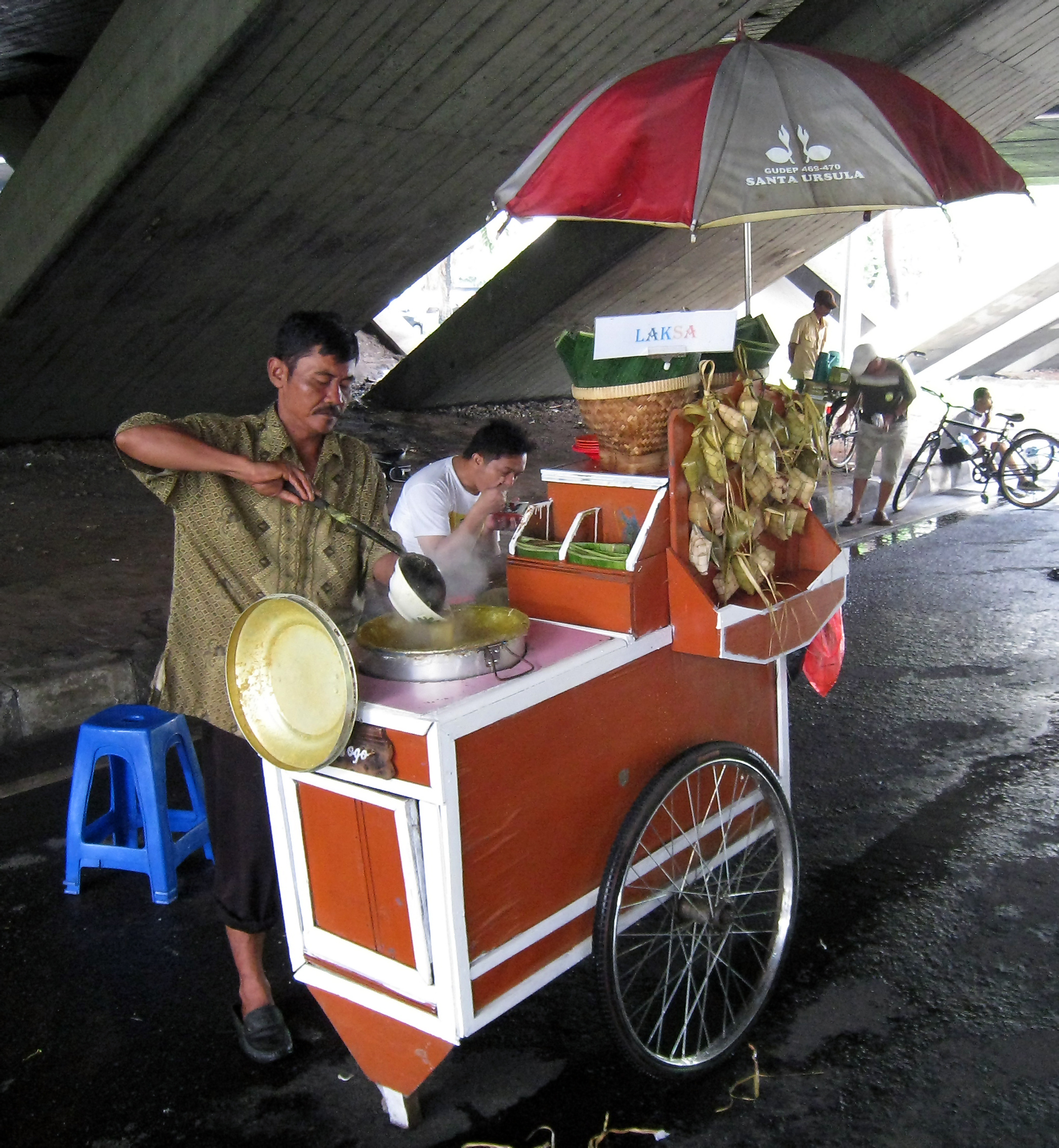
Laksa Bogor

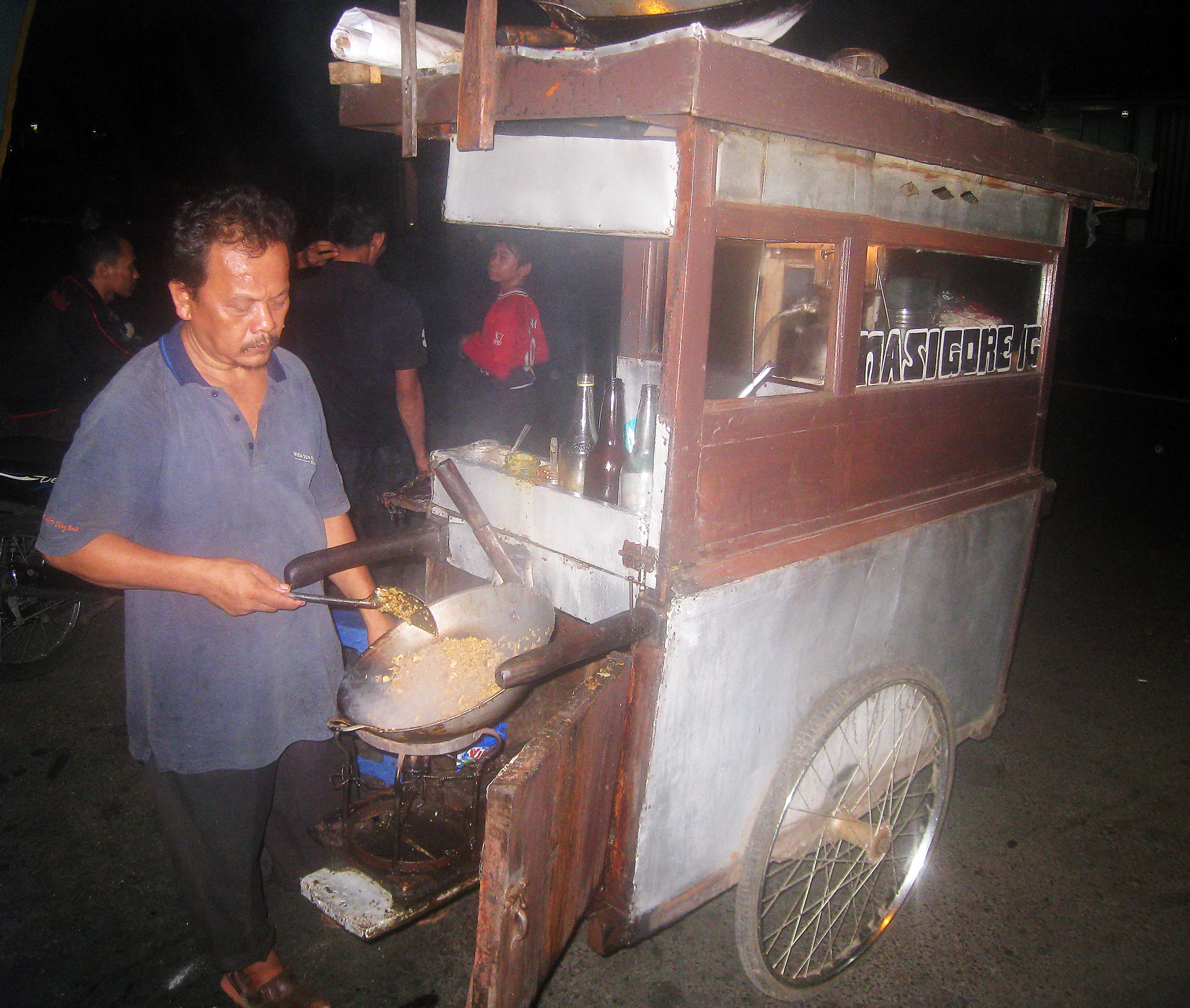
Nasi goreng

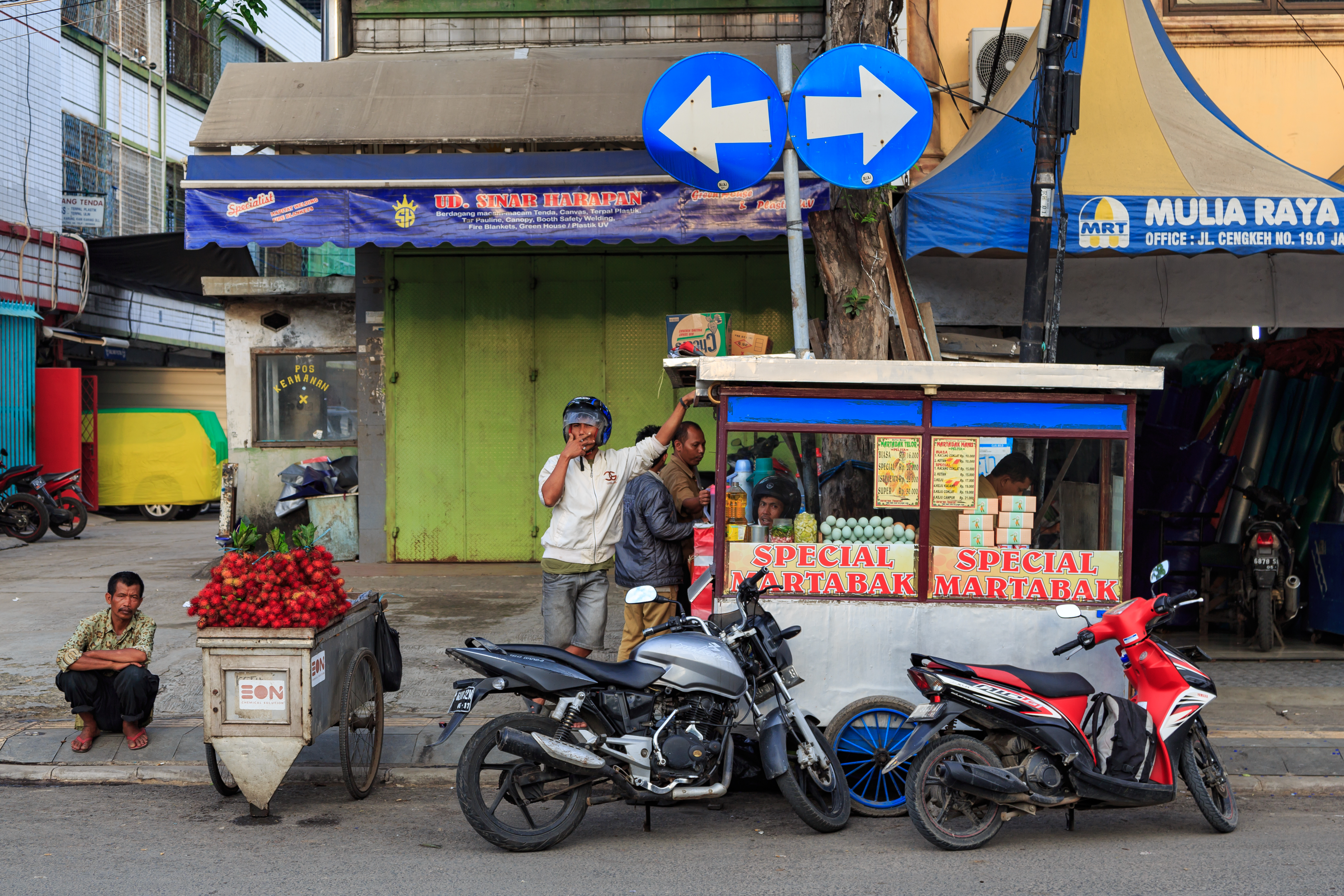
Martabak

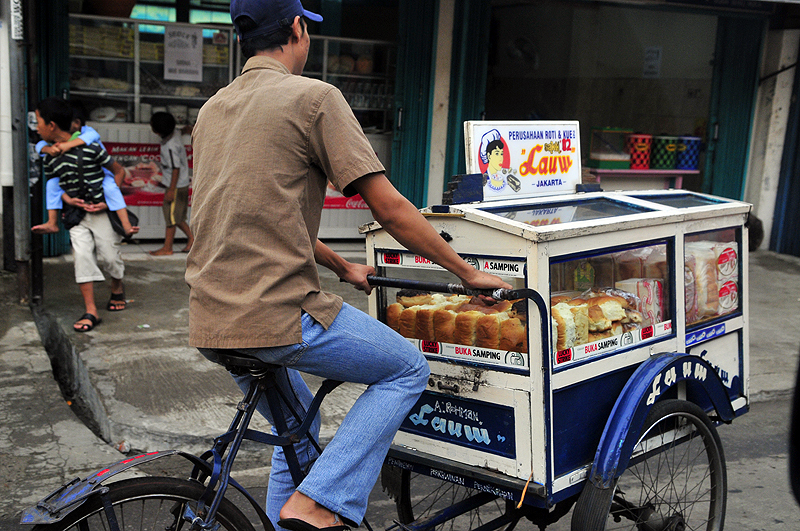
Roti

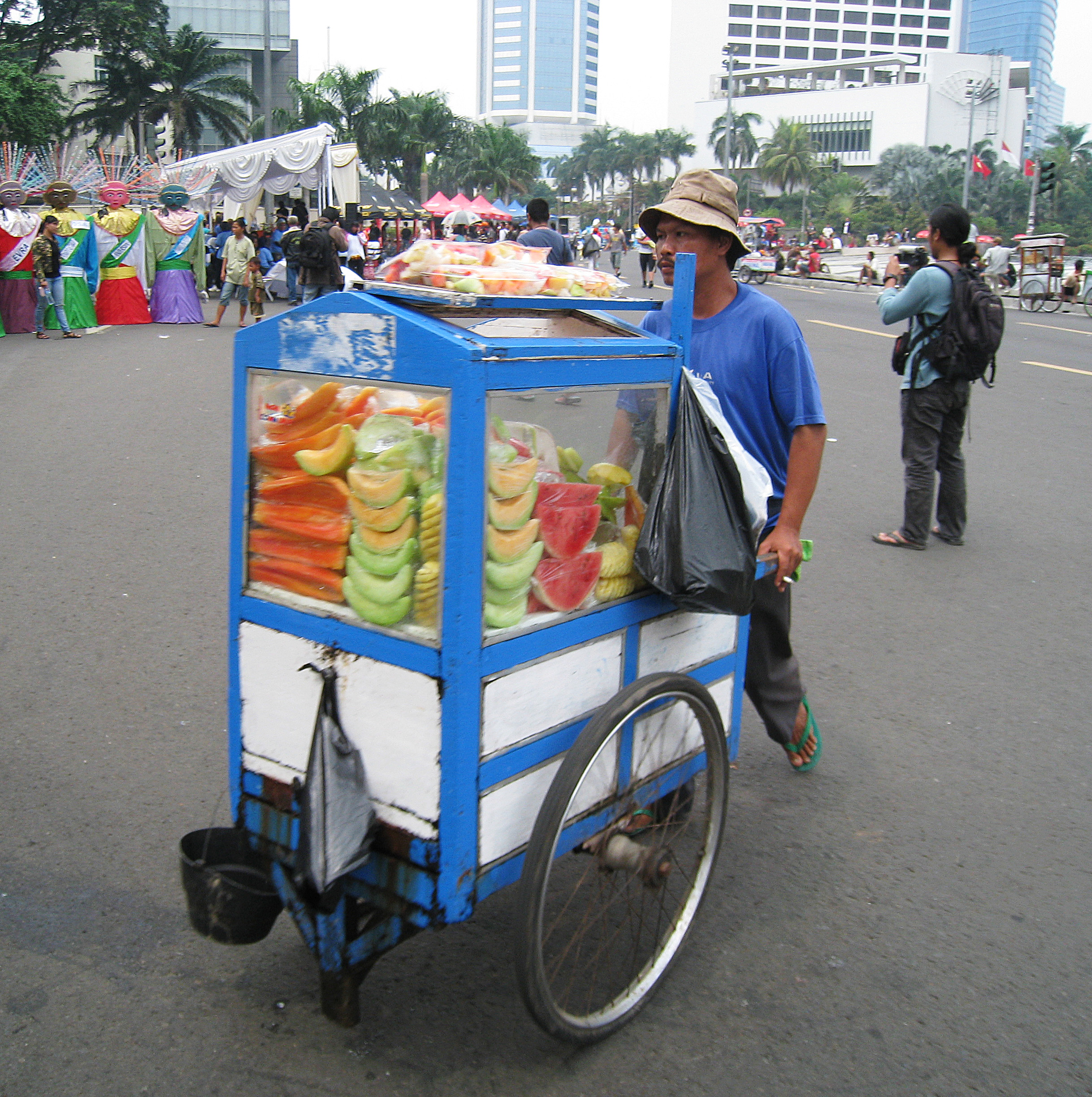
Rujak buah

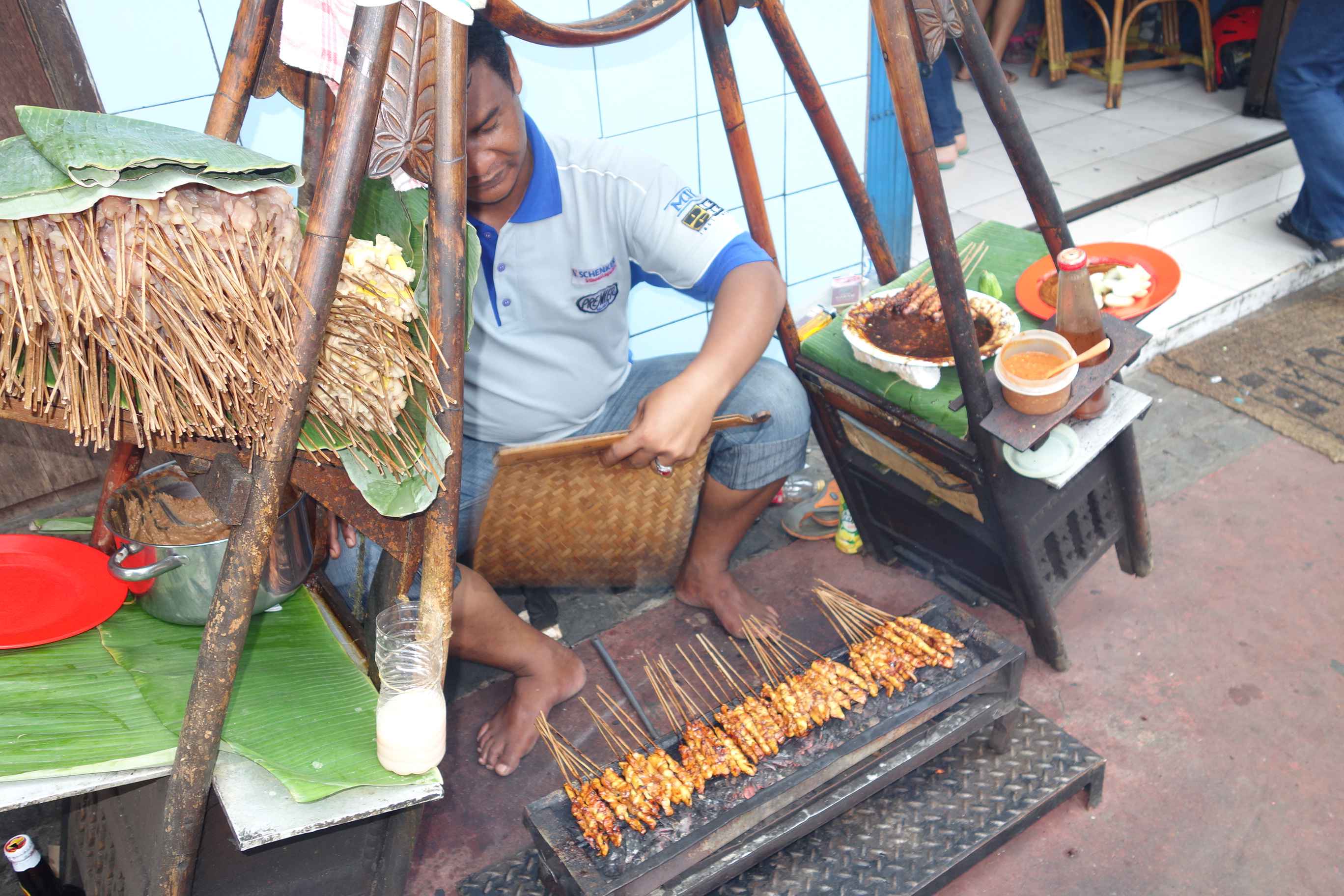
Sate Ayam

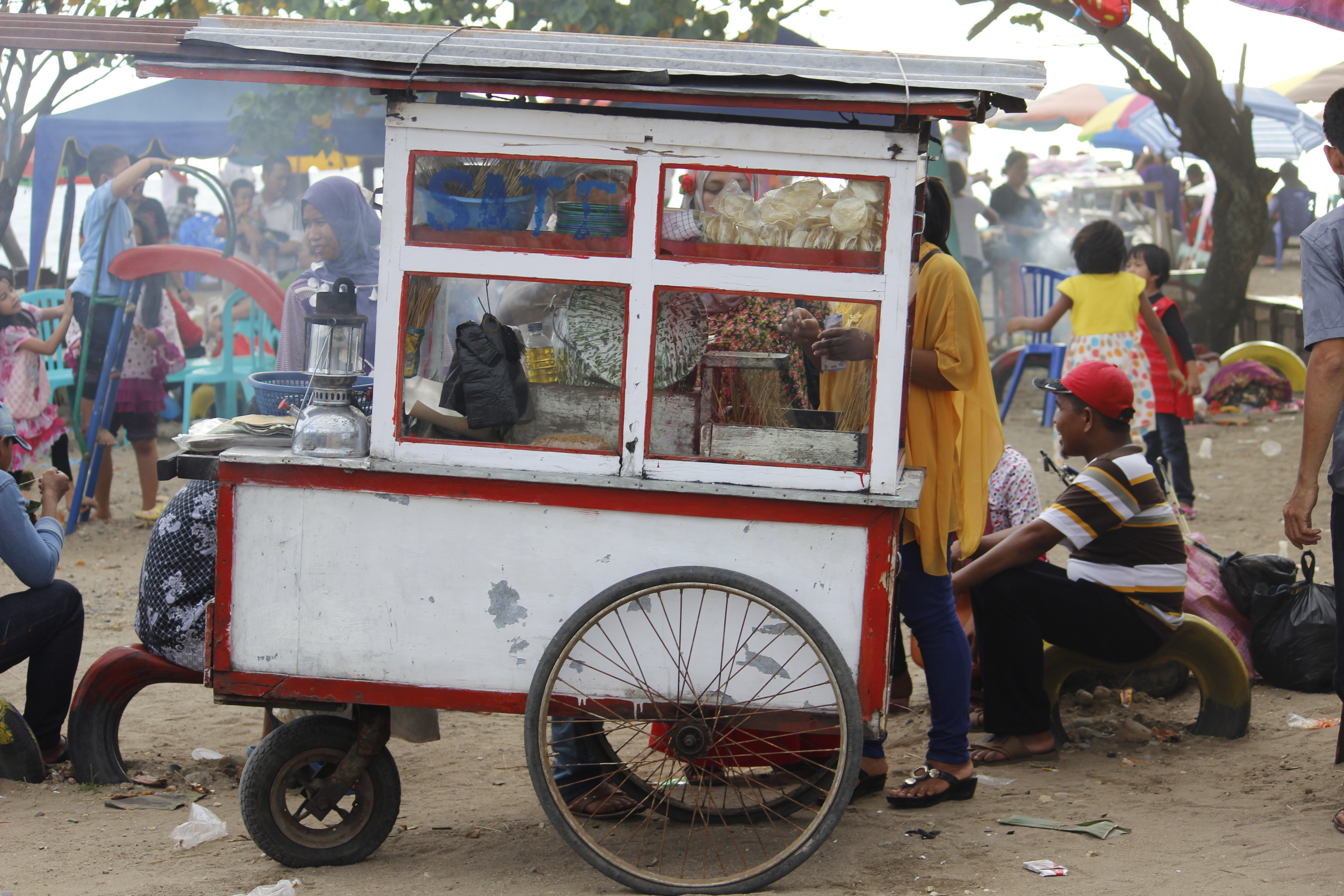
Sate Padang

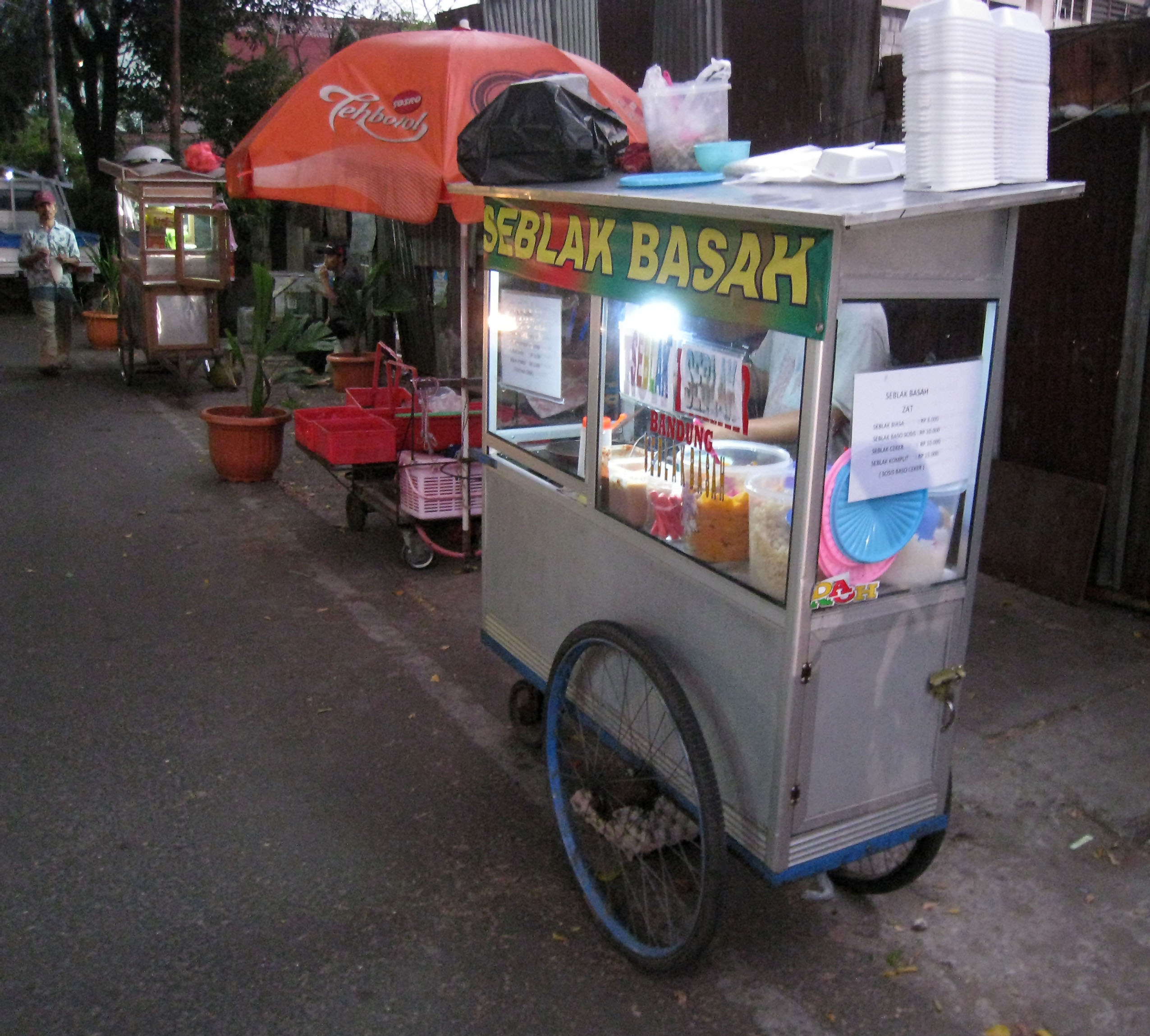
Seblak

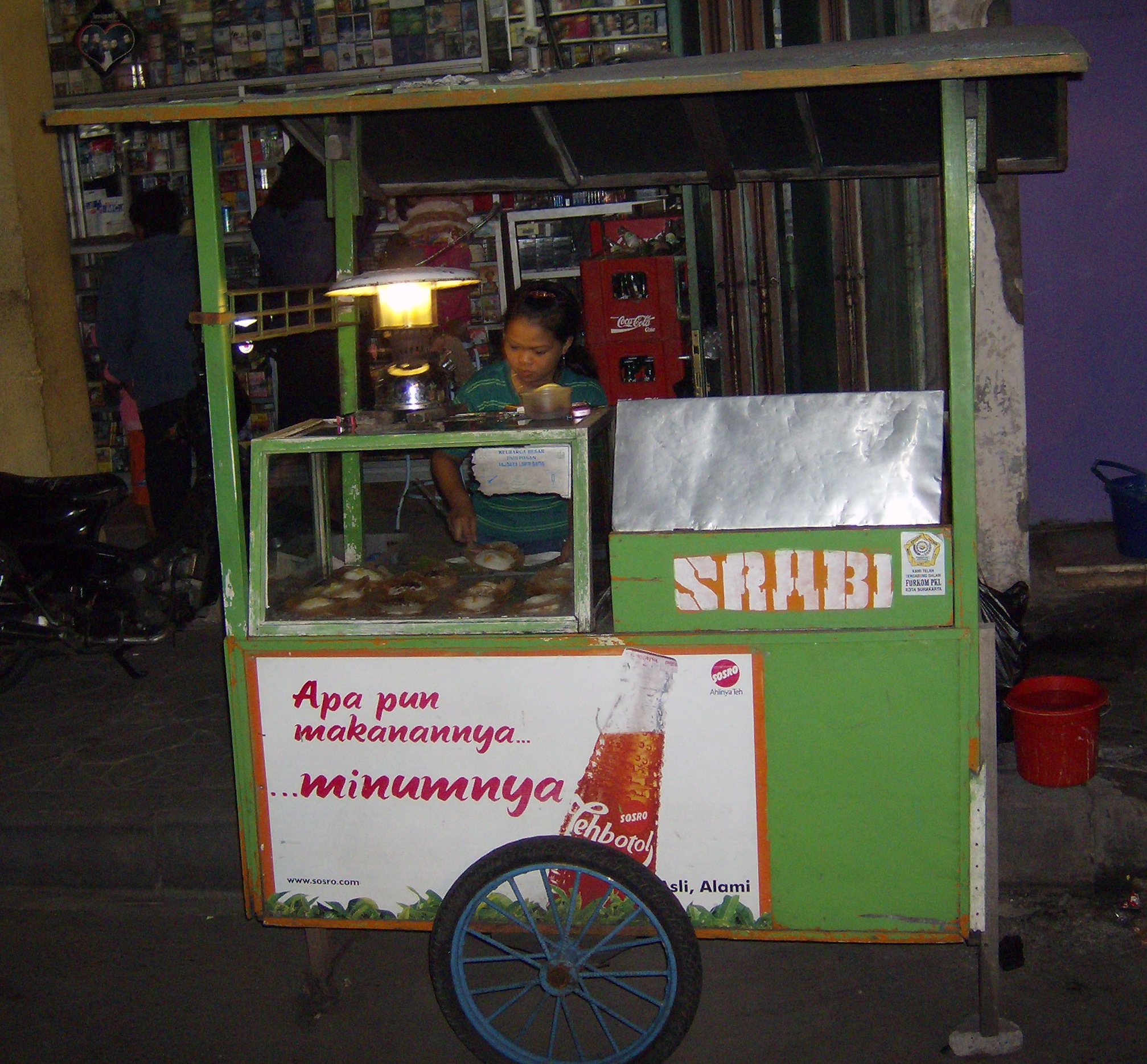
Serabi

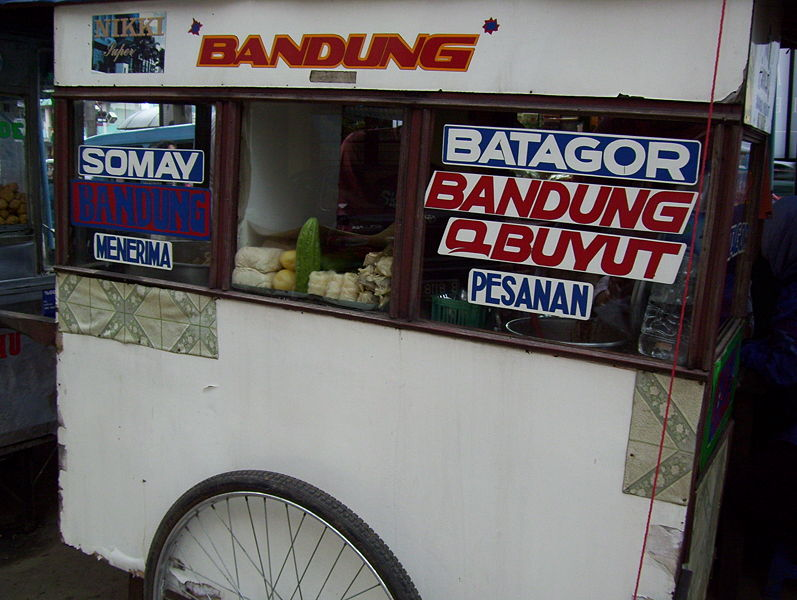
Siomay

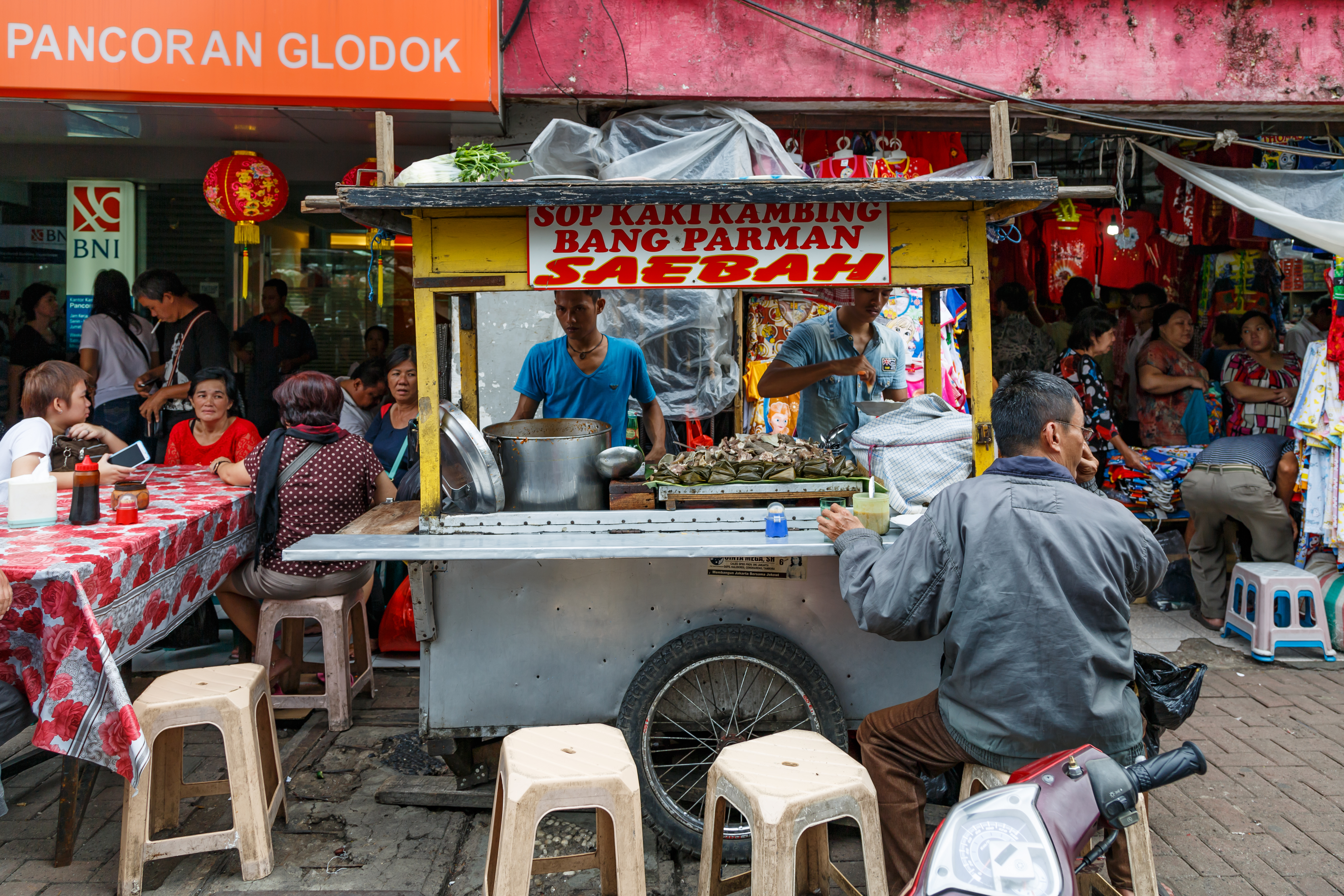
Sop kaki kambing

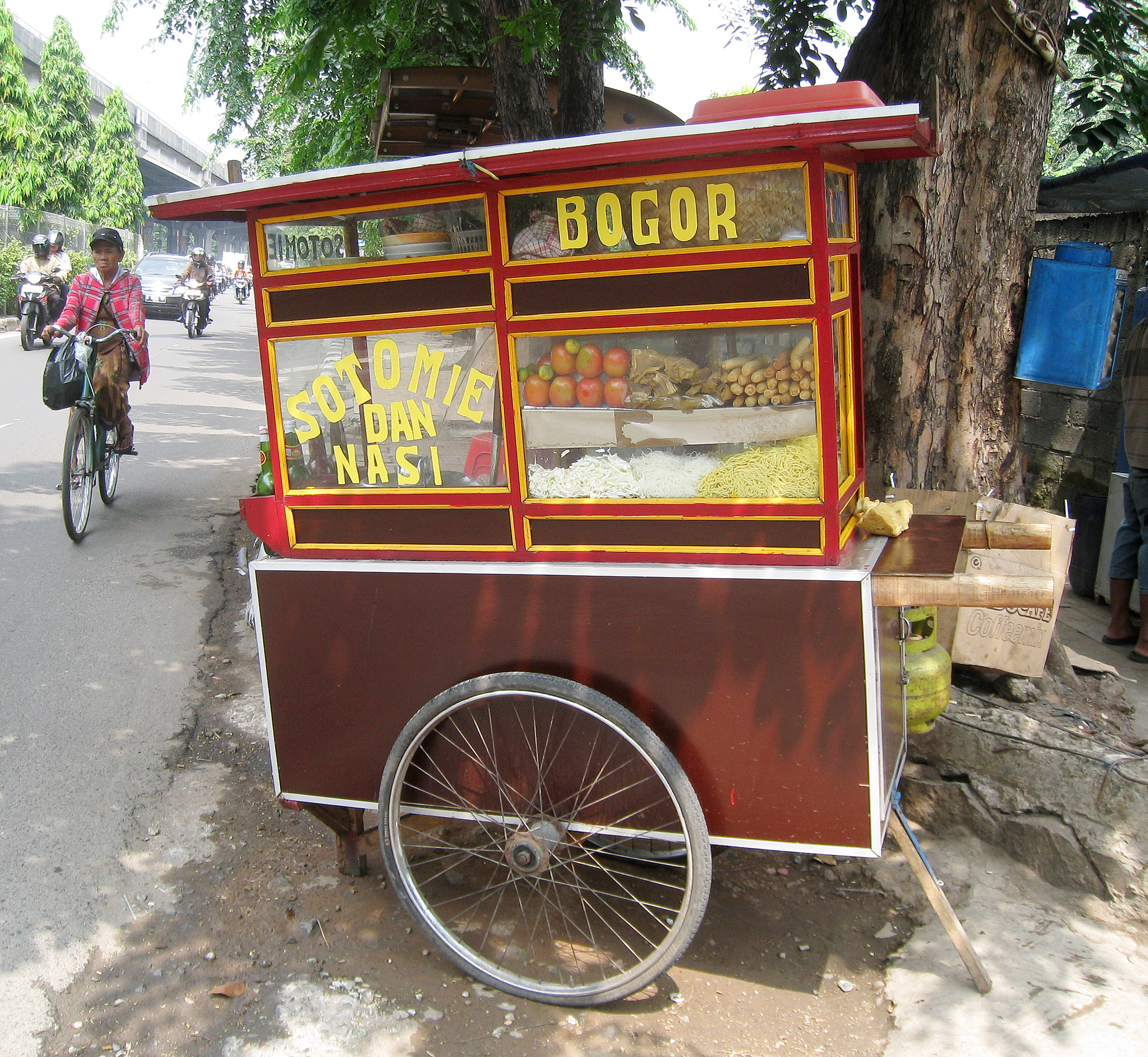
Soto mie

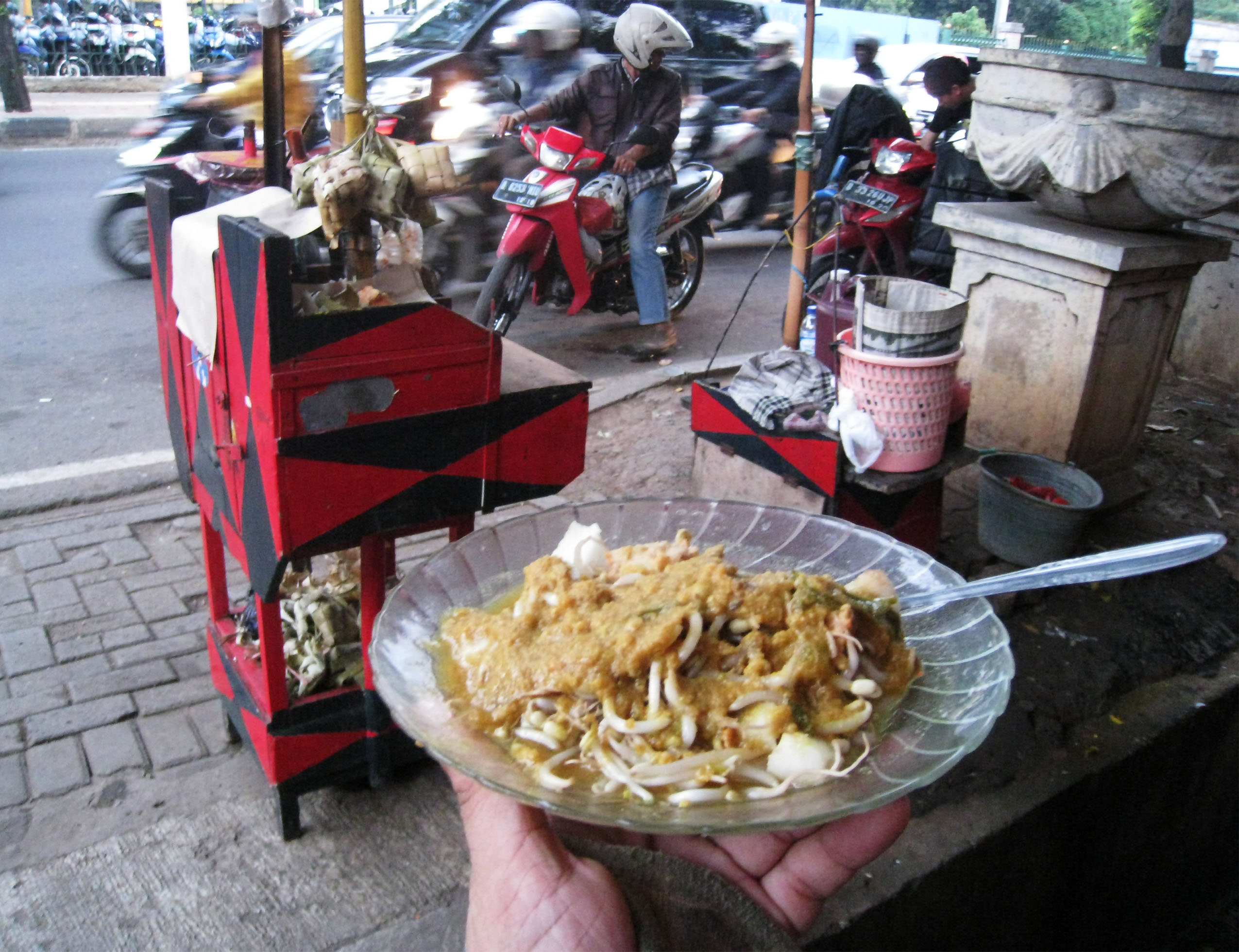
Tauge goreng

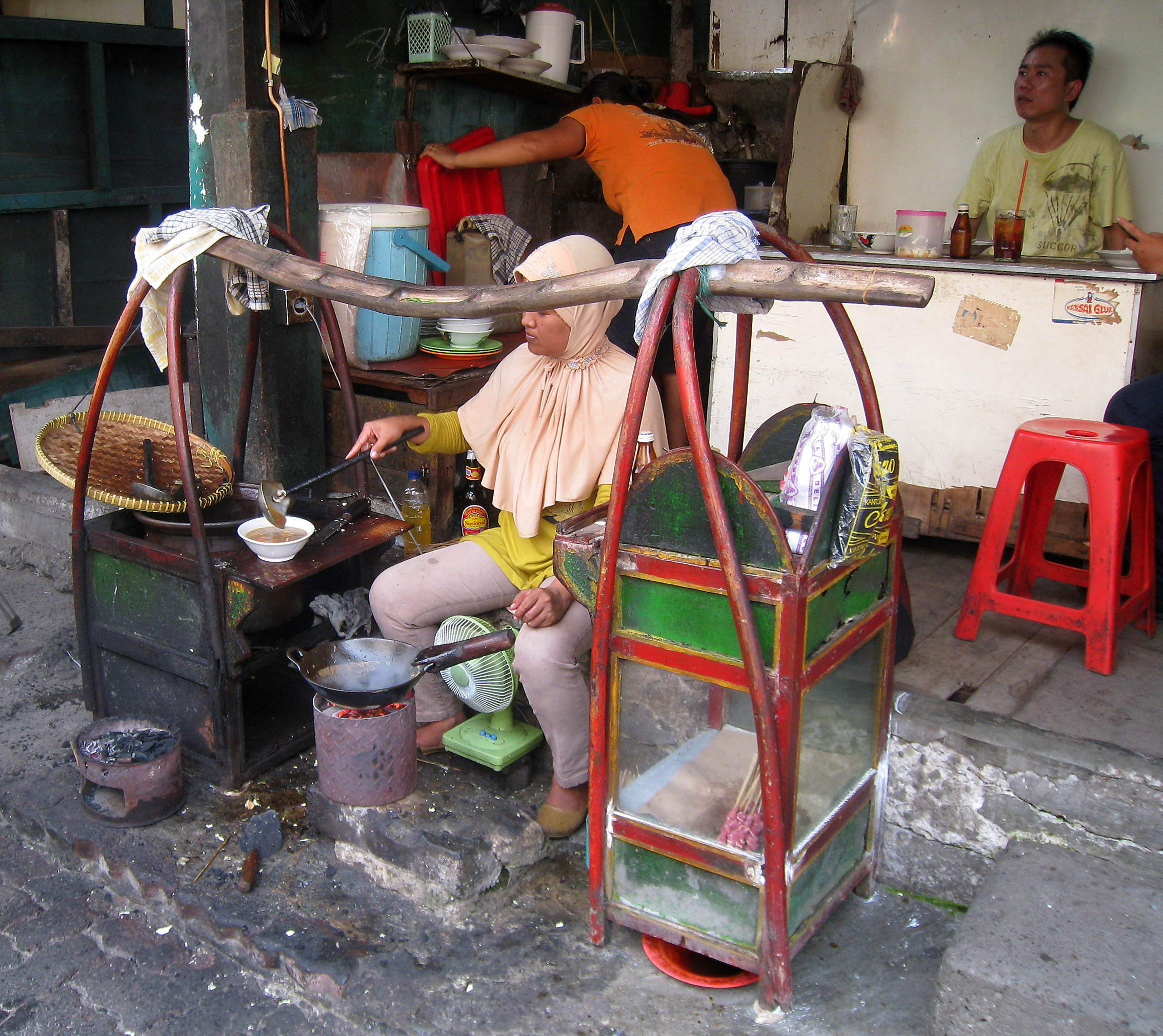
Tongseng

== See also ==
- Hong Kong street food
- Street food of Thailand
- List of Indonesian dishes
- List of street foods
- Regional street food
