= Indonesian cuisine =

Culinary traditions of Indonesia

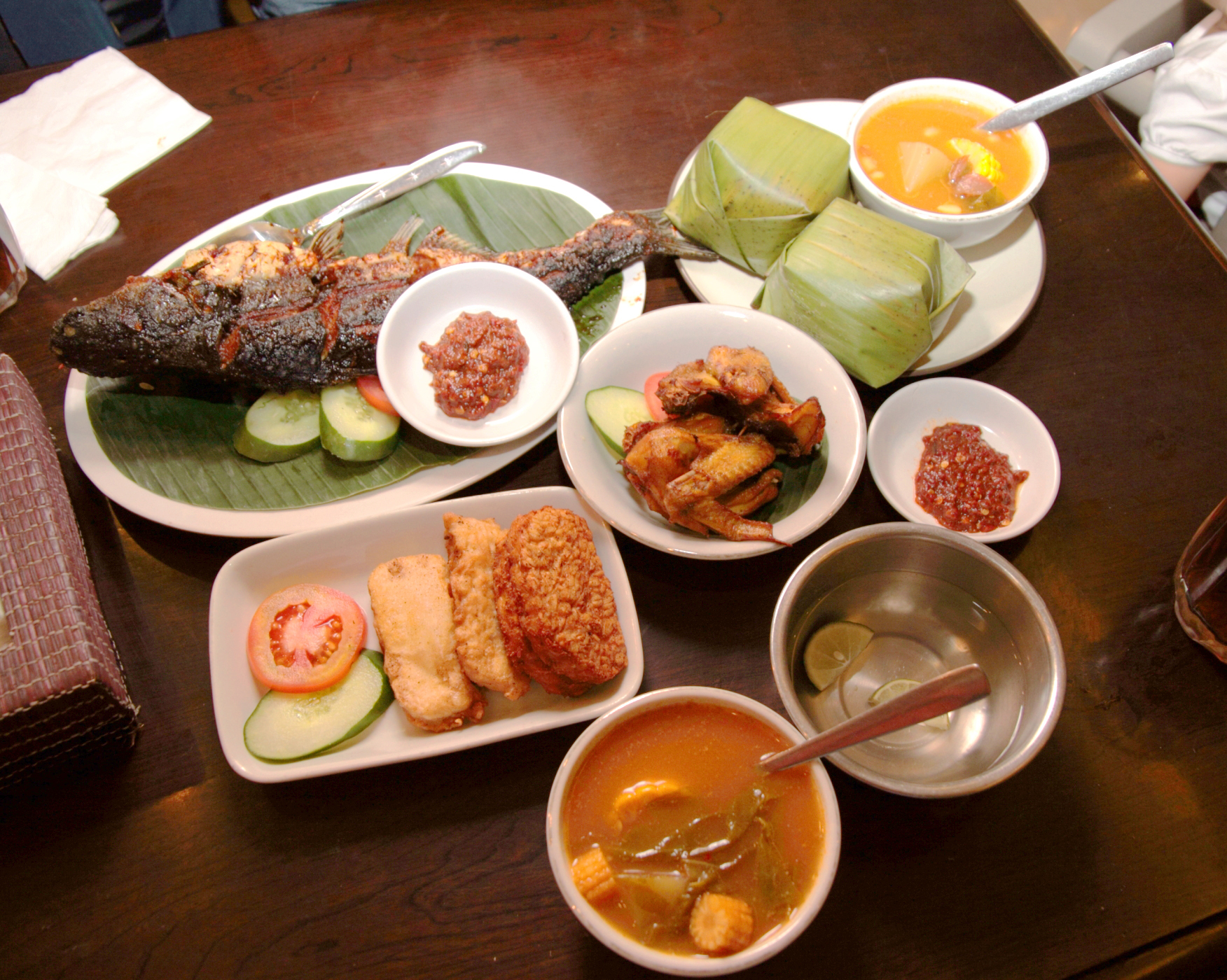
Example of an Indonesian Sundanese meal: ikan bakar (grilled fish), nasi timbel (rice wrapped in banana leaf), ayam goreng (fried chicken), sambal, fried tempeh and tofu, and sayur asem; the bowl of water with lime is kobokan.

Indonesian cuisine is a collection of regional culinary traditions of the various ethnic groups that form the archipelagic nation of Indonesia. There are a wide variety of recipes and cuisines in part because Indonesia is composed of approximately 6,000 populated islands of the total 17,508 in the world's largest archipelago, with more than 600 ethnic groups.

There are many regional cuisines, often based upon indigenous cultures, with some foreign influences.

== Tradition and characteristics ==
Indonesia has around 5,350 traditional recipes, with 30 of them considered the most important. Indonesia's cuisine ranges from rice, noodle and soup dishes in modest local eateries to street-side snacks to elaborate dishes in expensive restaurants.

Indonesian cuisine varies greatly by region and has many different influences. Sumatran cuisine, for example, has Middle Eastern and Indian influences, featuring curried meat and vegetables such as gulai and curry, while Javanese cuisine is mostly indigenous, with some hints of Chinese influence.

The cuisines of Eastern Indonesia are similar to Polynesian and Melanesian cuisine. Elements of Chinese cuisine can be seen throughout Indonesian cuisine: foods such as noodles, meat balls, spring rolls, and wontons have been completely assimilated.

Throughout its history, Indonesia has been involved in trade due to its location and natural resources. The country's indigenous techniques and ingredients were influenced by India, the Middle East, China, and Europe. Spanish and Portuguese traders brought New World produce even before the Dutch came to colonize most of the archipelago. Indonesia's Moluccas Islands (Maluku), which are famed as "the Spice Islands", contributed to the introduction of spices such as cloves and nutmeg to Indonesian and global cuisine.

Indonesian cuisine often has complex flavours, acquired from certain ingredients and bumbu spice mixtures. Indonesian dishes have rich flavours; usually described as savory, hot and spicy, and also combination of basic tastes such as sweet, salty, sour and bitter. Most Indonesians favour hot and spicy food, thus sambal, Indonesian spicy chili sauce with various optional ingredients, notably shrimp paste, shallots, and others, is a staple condiment at all Indonesian tables. The seven main Indonesian cooking methods are frying, grilling, roasting, dry roasting, sautéing, boiling and steaming.

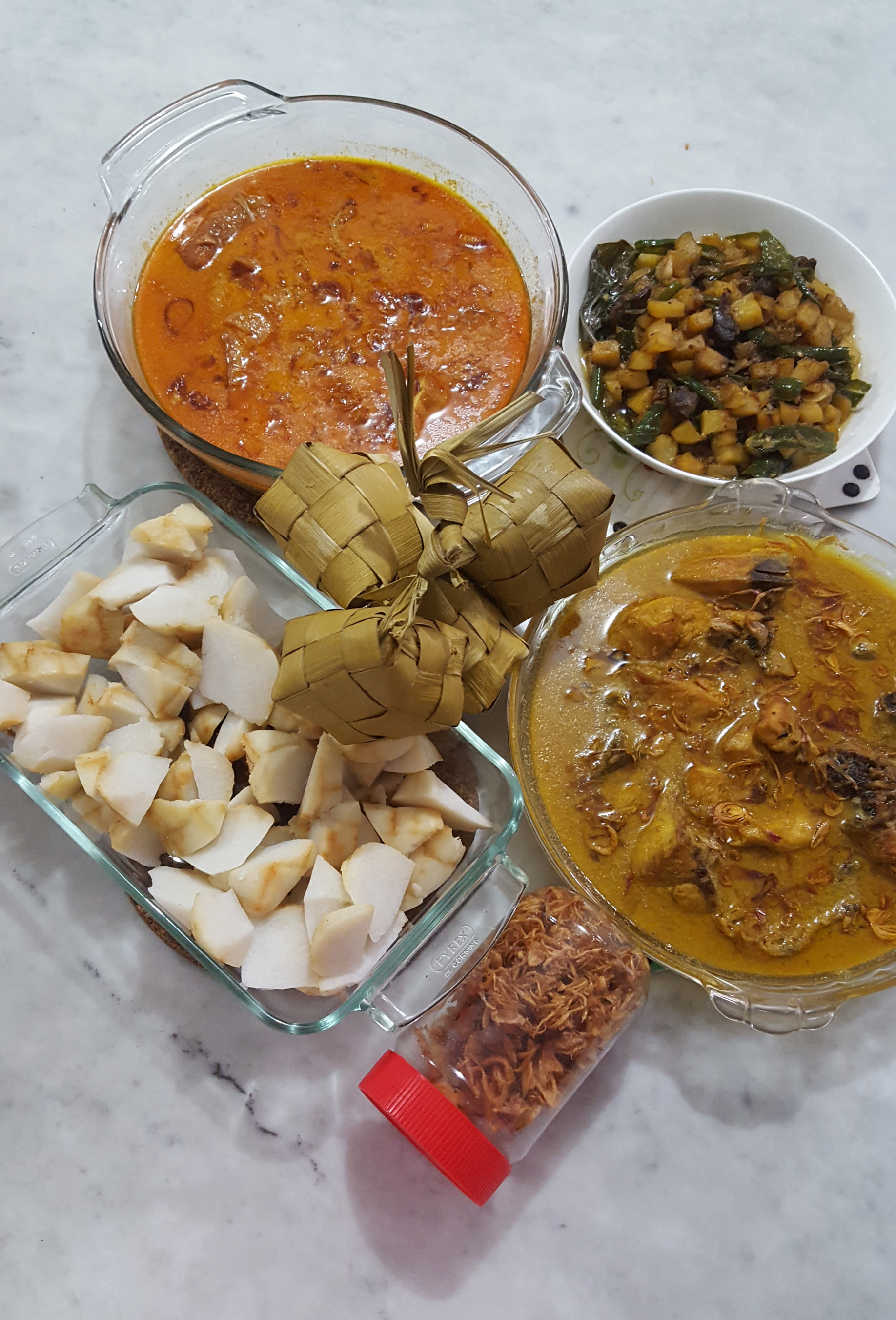
Opor ayam (curry style), gulai, ketupat, diced potatoes with spices, and bawang goreng served during Lebaran (Eid al-Fitr) in Indonesia

Some popular Indonesian dishes such as nasi goreng, gado-gado, satay, and soto are ubiquitous in the country and are considered national dishes. The official national dish of Indonesia is tumpeng, chosen in 2014 by Indonesian Ministry of Tourism and Creative Economy as the dish that binds the diversity of Indonesia's various culinary traditions. Later in 2018, the same ministry has chosen 5 national dishes of Indonesia; they are soto, rendang, satay, nasi goreng, and gado-gado.

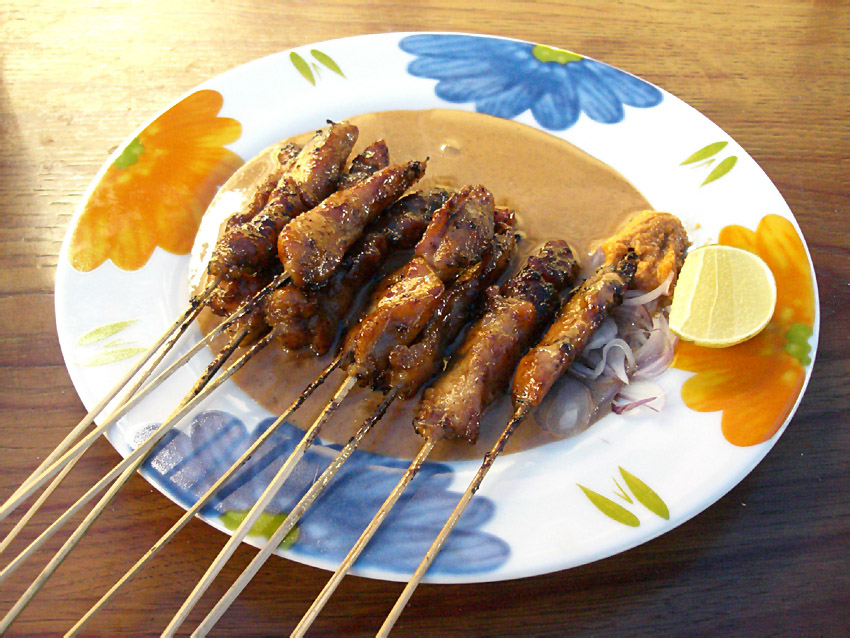
Indonesia is the home of sate; one of the country's national dishes, there are many variants across Indonesia.

Today, some popular dishes that originated in Indonesia are now common to neighbouring countries, Malaysia and Singapore. Indonesian dishes such as satay, beef rendang, and sambal are popular in Malaysia and Singapore. Soy-based dishes, such as variations of tofu and tempeh, are also very popular. Tempeh is regarded as a Javanese invention, a local adaptation of soy-based food fermentation and production. Another fermented food is oncom, similar in some ways to tempeh but using a variety of bases (not only soy), created by different fungi, and particularly popular in West Java.

== History ==
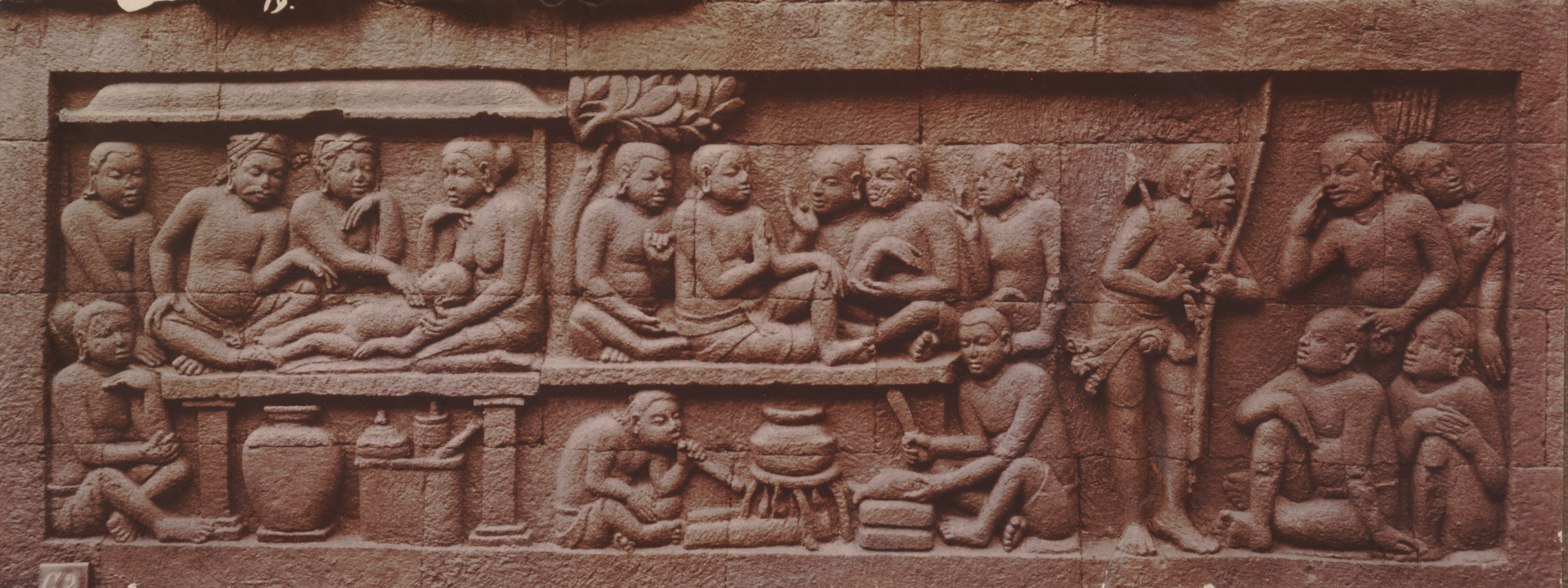
Bas-relief of Borobudur depicting cooking and cleaning the fish scales

Indonesian cuisine has a long history—although most of it is not well-documented, and relied heavily on local practice and oral traditions. An exception is Javanese cuisine, which has quite a well-documented culinary tradition.

The diversity ranges from ancient bakar batu or stone-grilled yams and boar practiced by Papuan tribes of eastern Indonesia, to sophisticated contemporary Indonesian fusion cuisine. The ethnic diversity of Indonesian archipelago provides an eclectic combination — mixing local Javanese, Sundanese, Balinese, Minang, Malay and other native cuisine traditions, with centuries worth of foreign contacts with Indian traders, Chinese migrants and Dutch colonials.

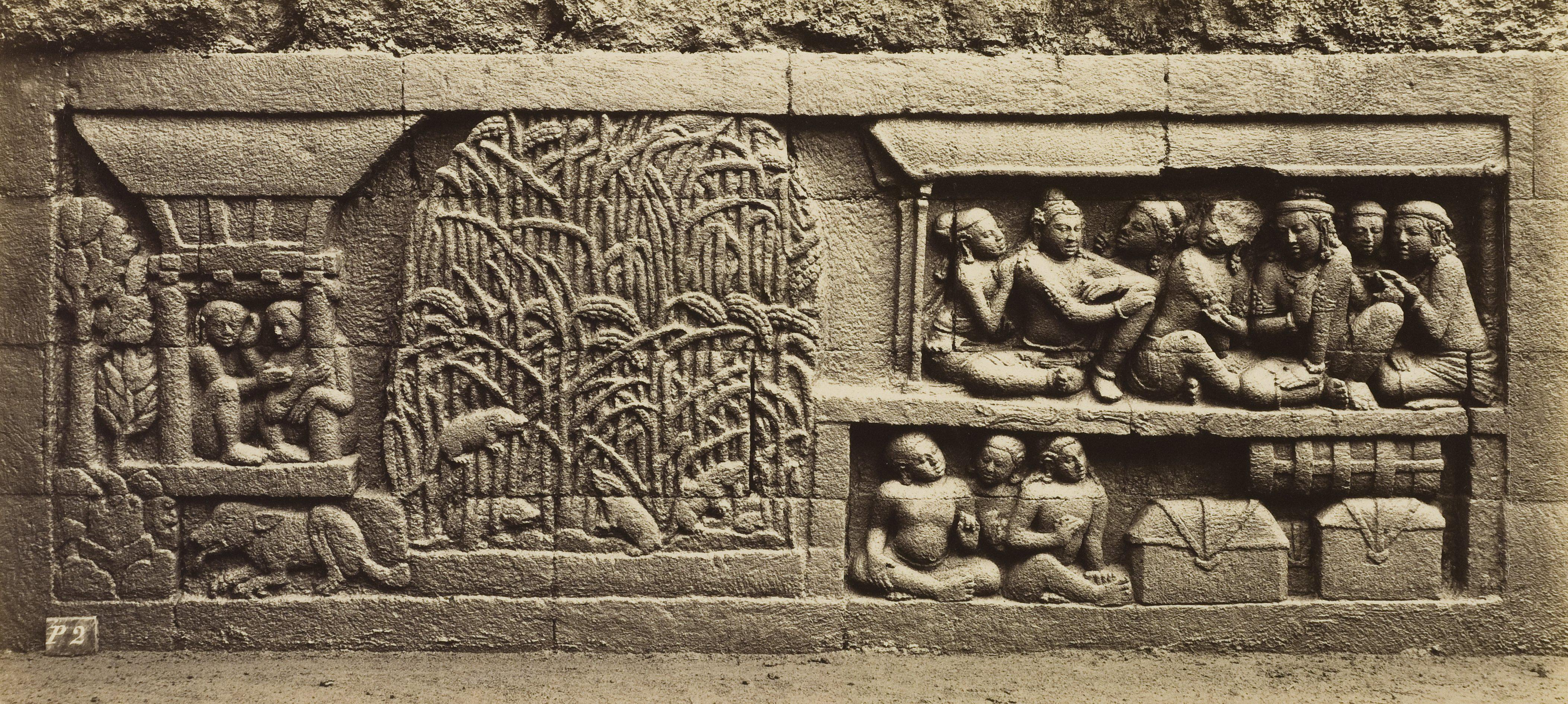
Bas-relief of Karmawibhanga of 9th century Borobudur depicts a rice barn and rice plants being infested by mouse pestilence. Rice farming has a long history in Indonesia.

Rice has been an essential staple for Indonesian society, as bas-reliefs of 9th century Borobudur and Prambanan describes rice farming in ancient Java. Ancient dishes were mentioned in many Javanese inscriptions and historians have succeeded in deciphering some of them. Inscriptions from the 8th to 10th century Kingdom of Mataram era mention several ancient dishes, among others are hadaŋan haraŋ (minced water buffalo meat satay, similar to modern Balinese sate lilit), hadaŋan madura (water buffalo meat simmered with sweet palm sugar), and dundu puyengan (eel seasoned with lemon basil). Also various haraŋ-haraŋ (grilled meats) either celeṅ/wök (pork), hadahan/kbo (water buffalo), kidaŋ/knas (deer) or wḍus (goat). Ancient beverages include nalaka rasa (sugarcane juice), jati wangi (jasmine beverage), and kinca (tamarind juice). Also various kuluban (boiled vegetables served in spices, similar to modern urap) and phalamula (boiled yams and tubers served with liquid palm sugar). Other ancient vegetable dishes include rumwah-rumwah (lalap), dudutan (raw vegetables) and tetis.

The 9th century Old Javanese Kakawin Ramayana mentions cooking technique as Trijata offered Sita some food (canto 17.101); scrumptious food of landuga tatla-tila (cooked with oil) and modakanda sagula (sugared delicacies).

Several foods are mentioned in Javanese inscriptions dated from the 10th to 15th centuries. Some of this dishes are identified with present-day Javanese foods. Among others are pecel, pindang, rarawwan (rawon), rurujak (rujak), kurupuk (krupuk), sweets like wajik and dodol, also beverages like dawet.

In the 15th century Sundanese manuscript Sanghyang Siksa Kandang Karesian, it was mentioned the common Sundanese food flavours of that times which includes; lawana (salty), kaduka (hot and spicy), tritka (bitter), amba (sour), kasaya (savoury), and madura (sweet).

By the 13th to 15th century, coastal Indonesian polities began to absorb culinary influences from India and the Middle East, as evidence with the adoption of curry-like recipes in the region. This was especially the case in the coastal towns of Aceh, Minangkabau lands of West Sumatra, and Malay ports of Sumatra and Malay peninsula. Subsequently, those culinary traditions displayed typical Indian culinary influences, such as kare (curry), roti cane and gulai. This also went hand in hand with the adoption of Islamic faith, thus encouraged halal Muslim dietary law that omits pork. On the other hand, the indigenous inhabitant that resides inland—such as the Bataks and Dayaks, retains their older Austronesian culinary traditions, which incorporate bushmeat, pork and blood in their daily diet.

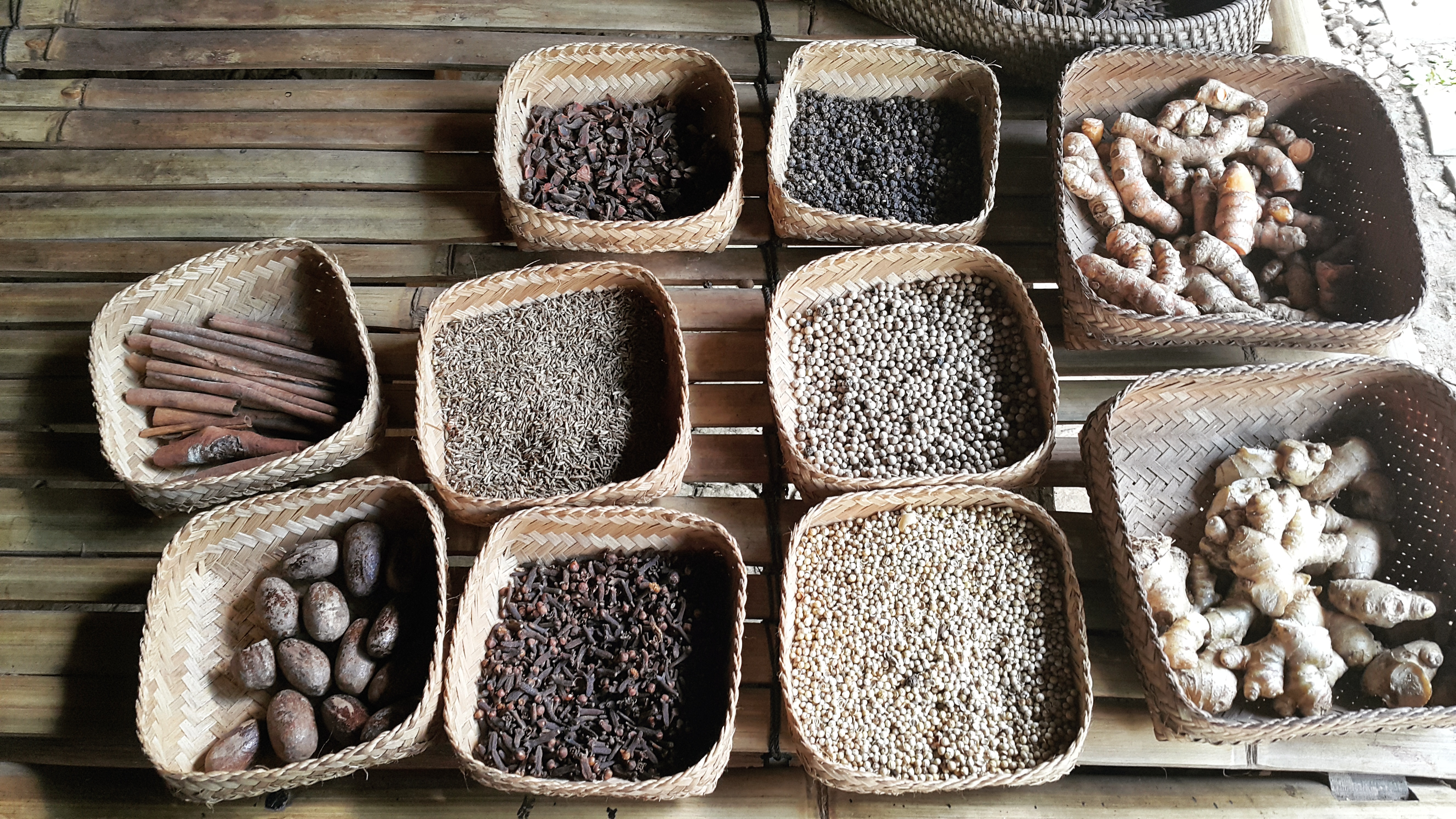
Indonesian spices (bumbu) including peppercorn, clove, cinnamon and nutmeg. The famed 16th century spice trade has prompted European traders to seek spices' sources as far as Indonesian archipelago.

According to the 17th century account of Rijklof van Goens, the ambassador of the VOC for Sultan Agung's Javanese Mataram court, (Note: as mentioned in Anthony Reid "Southeast Asia in Commerce 1450–1680 Volume I: The Land Below the Winds") meat (sheep, goat, and buffalo) was prepared for celebrations in Java by grilling and frying the seasoned meat. Unlike Europeans, the Javanese primarily use coconut oil instead of butter.

Chinese immigrants settled in the Indonesian archipelago as early as the Majapahit period, circa 15th century CE, and came in larger numbers during the Dutch colonial period. The Chinese settlers introduced stir-frying technique that required the use of the Chinese wok and a small amount of cooking oil. They also introduced some new Chinese cuisine—including soy sauce, (Note: later was localized as kecap manis (sweet soy sauce) with generous addition of palm sugar) noodles and soybean processing technique to make tofu. Subsequently, soybean processing led to the possibly accidental discovery of tempeh (fermented soybean cake). The earliest known reference to tempeh appeared in 1815 in the Javanese manuscript of Serat Centhini.

Indonesian culinary traditions have been exposed to various influences. The vigor of spice trade during the Age of Discovery has brought European traders to Indonesian shores. Subsequently, European colonialism was established in the 19th century Dutch East Indies. The influences of European cuisine—most notably Portuguese and Dutch, introduced European techniques, especially in terms of bread-making, pastries, cookies and cake-baking.

Each region has developed a specificity that ultimately leads to localization of regional taste.

== Customs, serving and consumption ==
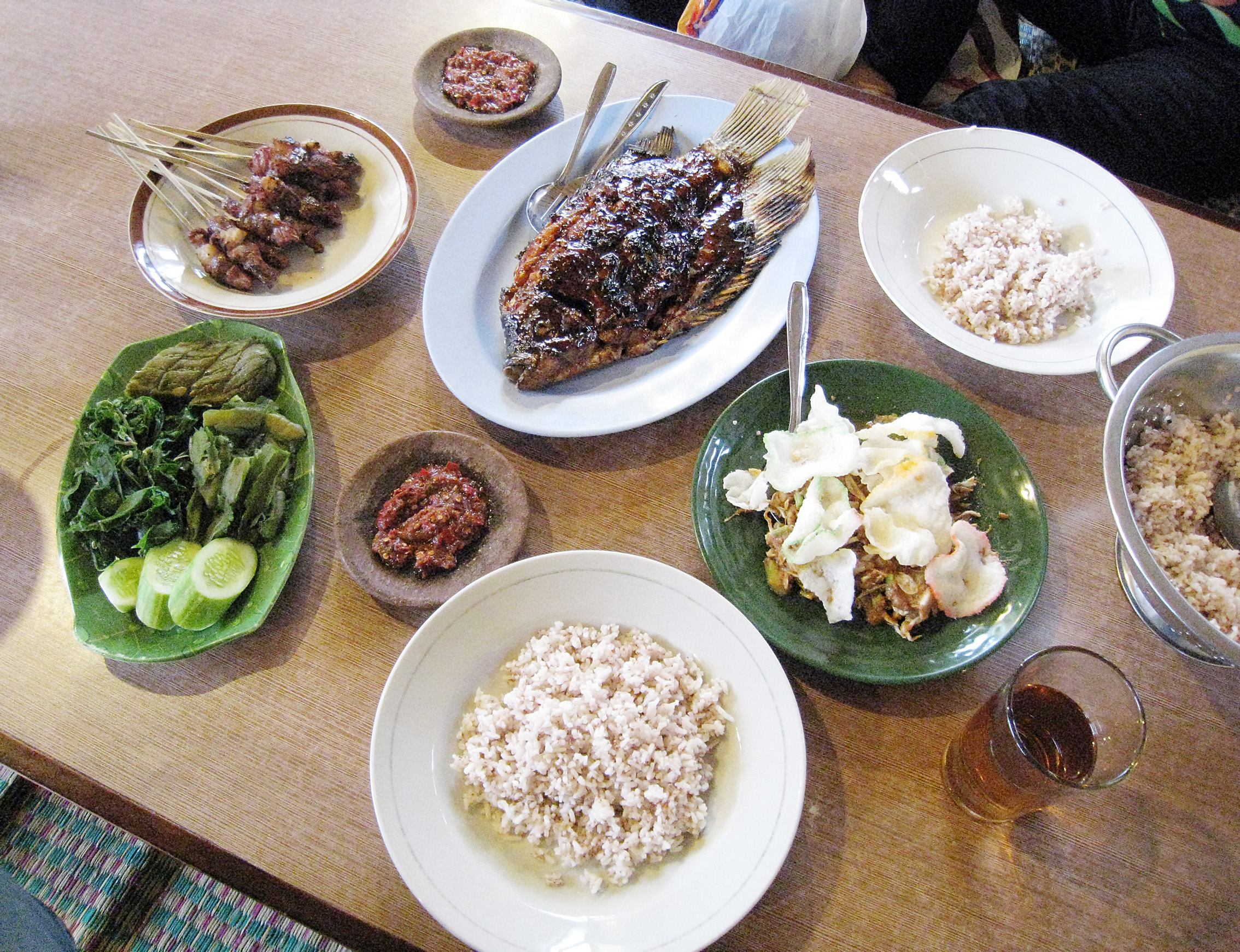
Indonesian typical communal meal, consisting of nasi (steamed rice), lauk-pauk (side dishes), and sayur-mayur (vegetables).

Indonesian traditional meals usually consists of steamed rice as staple, surrounded by vegetables and soup and meat or fish side dishes. In a typical family meal, the family members gather around the table filled with steamed rice and several other dishes. Each dish is placed in a large communal plate or in bowls. Each of these dishes has its own serving spoons, used only to move food from the communal plate to one's personal plate. Each of the family members has their own personal plate that is first filled with steamed rice. Usually the oldest family member or the husband has the right to initiate the meal, followed by the rest of the family to help themselves with the dishes. Each of them take some portion of dishes from the communal plates into their own individual plates.

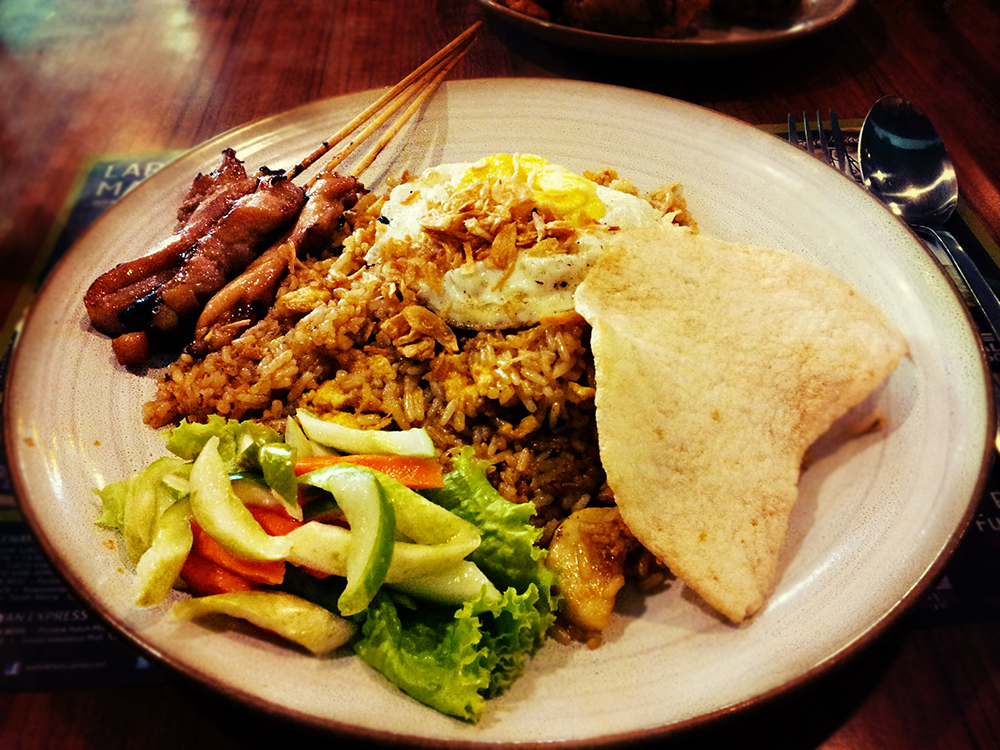
Nasi goreng-sate combo with egg and krupuk, popular Indonesian dish among foreigners.

On their personal plate, the steamed rice will soon be surrounded by two, three or more dishes; vegetables and fish or meat, and maybe some fried dishes, sambal and krupuk. In Indonesian customs — unlike in Japanese their counterpart — it is quite acceptable to be seen to mix the various dishes on a personal plate during consumption. A practice commonly found in nasi campur, nasi Padang, or during a buffet. The soupy dish might be served in a separate small personal bowl. Today in contemporary Indonesian restaurants, a set menu is often offered. This has led to the personal serving practice, in a similar fashion to those of Japanese cuisine, with a personal plate on a tray, a rattan or bamboo container each with a separate small portion of dishes surrounding the rice. This can be found in the presentation of nasi Bali.

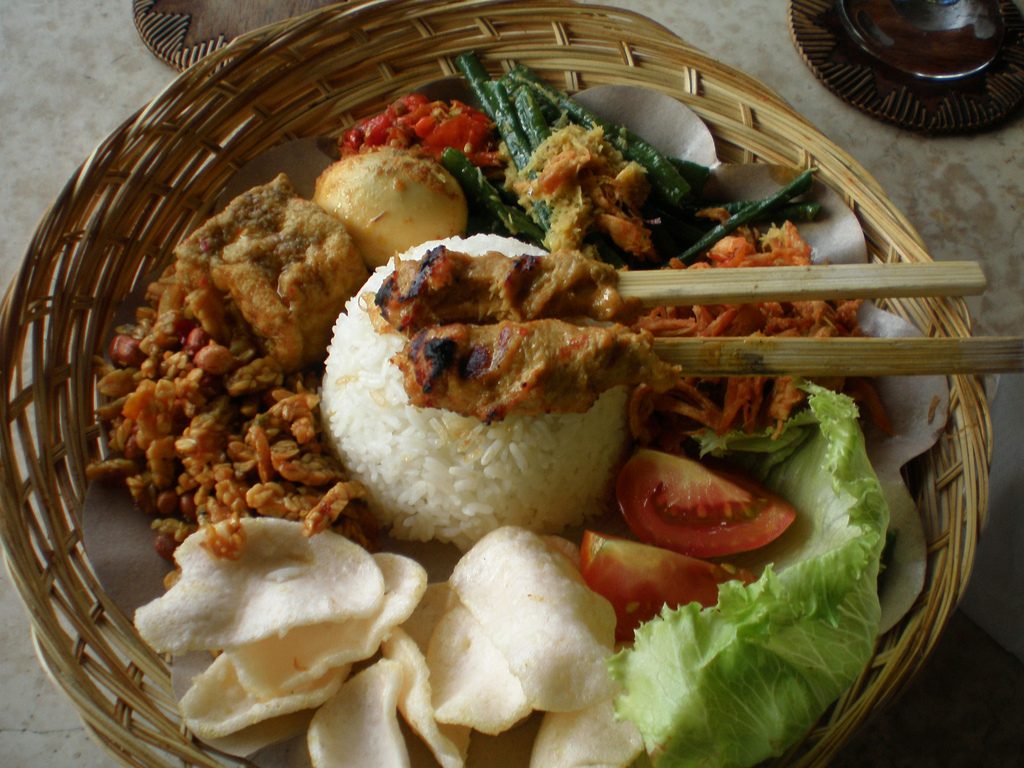
Personal serving of nasi Bali, on a woven bamboo plate with rice surrounded by pieces of meat and vegetable side dishes.

Indonesian meals are commonly eaten with a spoon in the right hand and fork in the left hand (to push the food onto the spoon). Unlike the European dining custom, knives are absent from the dining table, thus most of the ingredients such as vegetables and meat are already cut into bite-size pieces prior to serving. In some parts of the country, such as West Java, Gorontalo and West Sumatra, it is also common to eat with one's bare hands.

In restaurants or households that commonly use bare hands to eat, such as seafood food stalls, traditional Sundanese and Minangkabau restaurants, or East Javanese pecel lele (fried catfish with sambal) and ayam goreng (fried chicken) food stalls, kobokan is usually served along with the food. Kobokan is a bowl of tap water with a slice of lime in it to give a fresh scent. This bowl of water is not intended for consumption, rather it is used to wash one's hand before and after eating.

Chopsticks are generally only used in food stalls or restaurants serving Indonesian adaptations of Chinese cuisine, such as bakmie or mie ayam (chicken noodle) with pangsit (wonton), mie goreng (fried noodles), and kwetiau goreng (fried flat rice noodles).

== Staples ==
=== Rice ===
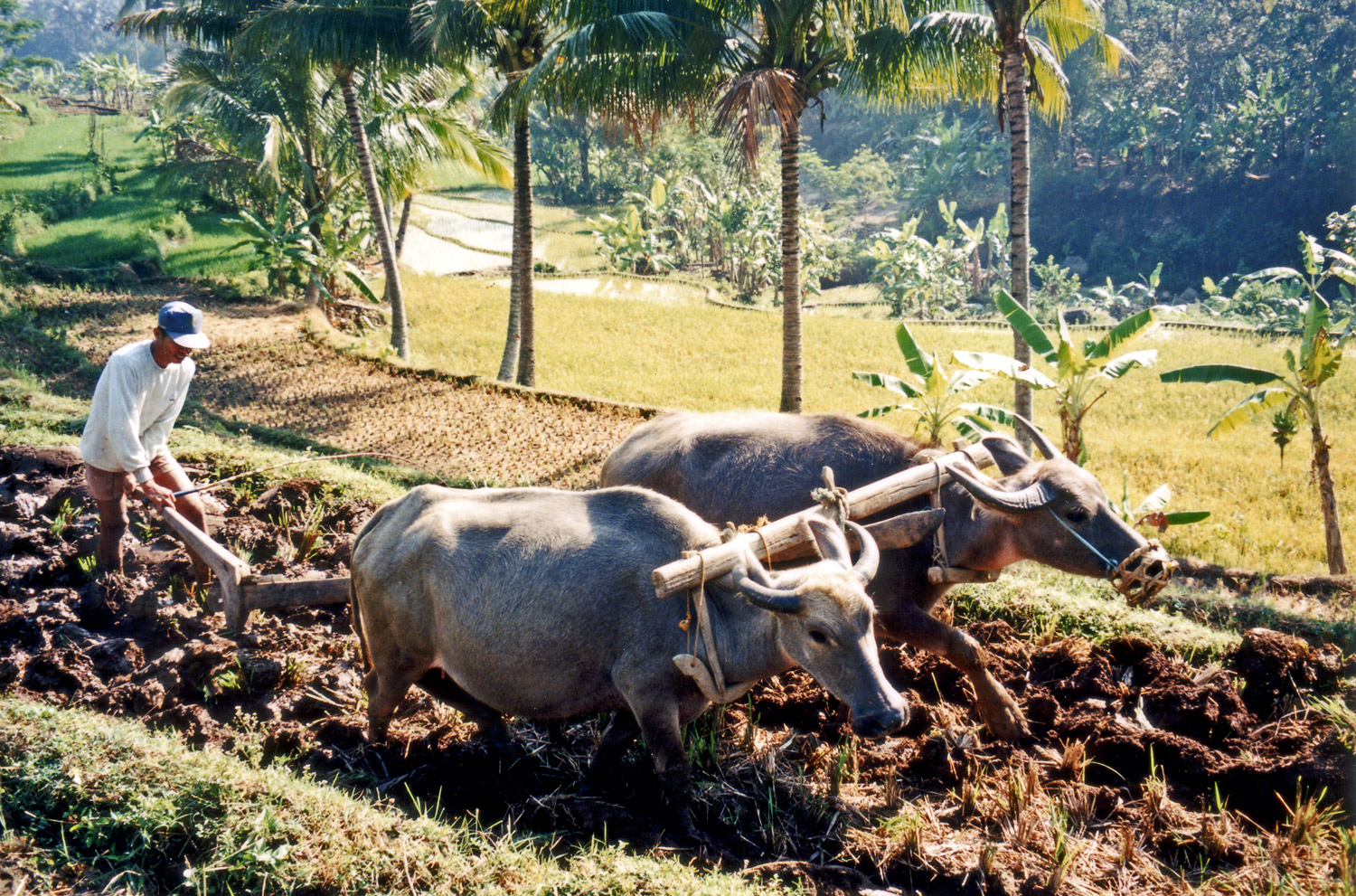
Using water buffalo to plough rice fields in Java; rice is a staple for all classes in contemporary; Indonesia is the world's third largest paddy rice producer and its cultivation has transformed much of Indonesia's landscape.

Rice is a staple for all classes in contemporary Indonesia and occupies a central place in Indonesian culture: it shapes the landscape; is sold at markets; and is served in most meals both as a savoury and a sweet food. The importance of rice in Indonesian culture is demonstrated through the reverence of Dewi Sri, the rice goddess of ancient Java and Bali. Traditionally the agricultural cycles linked to rice cultivations were celebrated through rituals, such as Seren Taun rice harvest festival.

Rice is most often eaten plain with just a few protein and vegetable dishes on the side. It is also served as nasi uduk (rice cooked in coconut milk), nasi kuning (rice cooked with coconut milk and turmeric), ketupat (rice steamed in woven packets of coconut fronds), lontong (rice steamed in banana leaves), intip or rengginang (rice crackers), desserts, vermicelli, noodles, arak beras (rice wine), and nasi goreng (fried rice). Nasi goreng is omnipresent in Indonesia and considered a national dish.

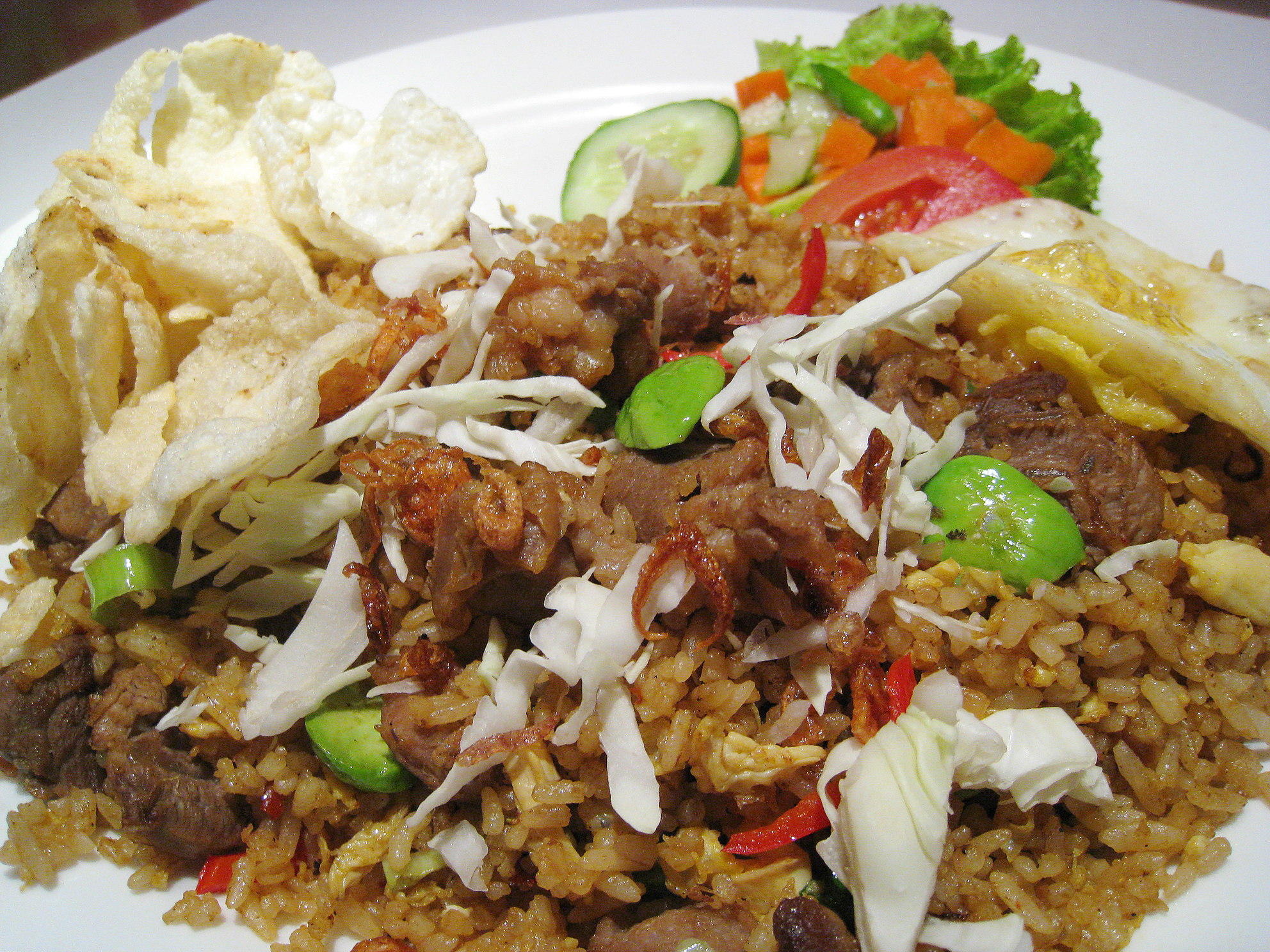
The ubiquitous nasi goreng (fried rice), considered one of Indonesia's national dishes, it has rich variants, this one uses green stinky bean and goat meat.

Rice was only incorporated into diets as either the technology to grow it, or the ability to buy it from elsewhere, was gained. Evidence of wild rice on the island of Sulawesi dates from 3000 BCE. Evidence for the earliest cultivation come from the eighth century stone inscriptions from the central island of Java, which shows that kings levied taxes in rice. Images of rice cultivation, rice barns, and pest mice infesting a ricefield are included in the Karmawibhanga bas-reliefs of Borobudur. Divisions of labour between men, women, and animals that are still in place in Indonesian rice cultivation were carved into relief friezes on the ninth century Prambanan temples in Central Java: a water buffalo attached to a plough; women planting seedlings and pounding grain; and a man carrying sheaves of rice on each end of a pole across his shoulders (pikulan). In the sixteenth century, Europeans visiting the Indonesian islands saw rice as a new prestige food served to the aristocracy during ceremonies and feasts.

Rice production in Indonesian history is linked to the development of iron tools and the domestication of wild Asian water buffalo as water buffalo for cultivation of fields and manure for fertiliser. Rice production requires exposure to the sun. Once covered in dense forest, much of the Indonesian landscape has been gradually cleared for permanent fields and settlements as rice cultivation developed over the last fifteen hundred years.

=== Wheat ===
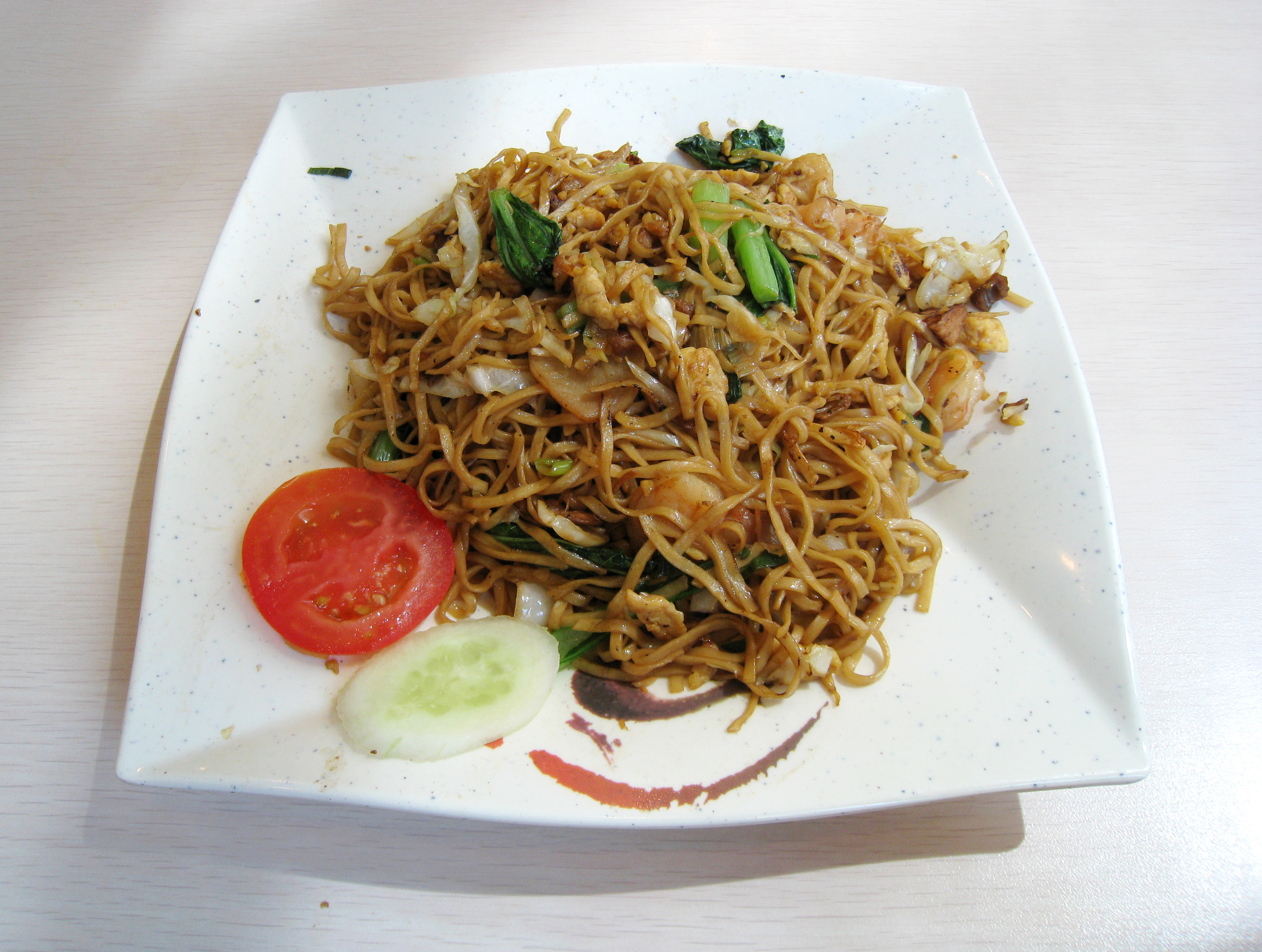
Mie goreng (fried noodle), a wheat-based Chinese dish completely assimilated into Indonesian mainstream cuisine.

Wheat is not a native plant to Indonesia. Through imports and foreign influences — most notably Chinese and Dutch — Indonesians acquired a taste for wheat-based foodstuffs, especially Chinese noodles, Indian roti, and Dutch bread. Other than common steamed rice, the Chinese in Indonesia also considered noodles, bakpao and cakwe as staples. Yet in Indonesia, especially in Java and Sumatra, the rice culture was so prevalent that sometimes these wheat-based dishes, such as noodles are treated as side dishes and are consumed with rice, while others such as Chinese buns and cakwe are treated as snacks. Europeans, especially the Portuguese and the Dutch, introduced bread and various types of baked goods and pastry. These European staples have now become alternatives for a quick breakfast.

Indonesian wheat consumption reached a new height after the advent of the Indonesian instant noodle industry in the 1970s. Since then, Indonesia has become one of the world's major producers and consumers of instant noodles. Indonesia is the world's second largest instant noodle market only after China, with demand reaching 12.54 billion servings in 2018. Today, instant noodles have become a staple in Indonesian households for quick hot meals. Certain brands such as Indomie have become household names.

=== Other staples ===
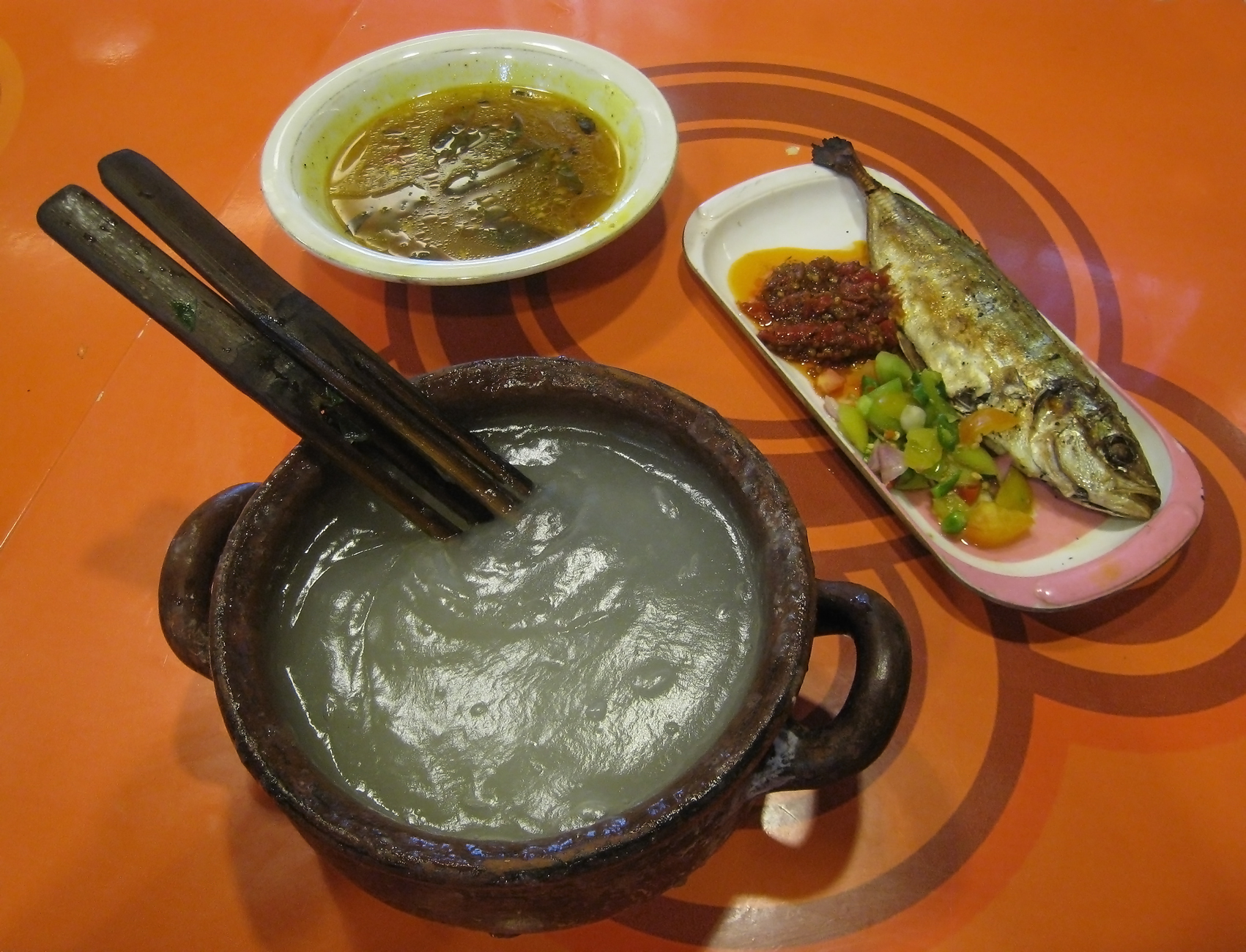
Papeda, staple food of eastern Indonesia, served with yellow soup and grilled mackerel.

Other staple foods in Indonesia include a number of starchy tubers such as yam, sweet potato, potato, taro and cassava. Starchy fruit such as breadfruit and jackfruit and grains such as maize are eaten. A sago congee called papeda is a staple food especially in Maluku and Papua. Sago is often mixed with water and cooked as a simple pancake. Next to sago, people of eastern Indonesia consume wild tubers as staple food.

Many types of tubers such as talas (a type of taro but larger and more bland) and breadfruit are native to Indonesia, while others were introduced from elsewhere. Yam was introduced from Africa; while potato, sweet potato, cassava and maize were introduced from the Americas through Spanish influence and reached Java in the 17th century. Cassava is usually boiled, steamed, fried or processed as a popular snack kripik singkong (cassava crackers). Dried cassava, locally known as tiwul, is an alternate staple food in arid areas of Java such as Gunung Kidul and Wonogiri, while other roots and tubers are eaten especially in hard times. Maize is eaten in drier regions such as Madura and islands east of the Wallace Line, such as the Lesser Sunda Islands.

== Vegetables ==
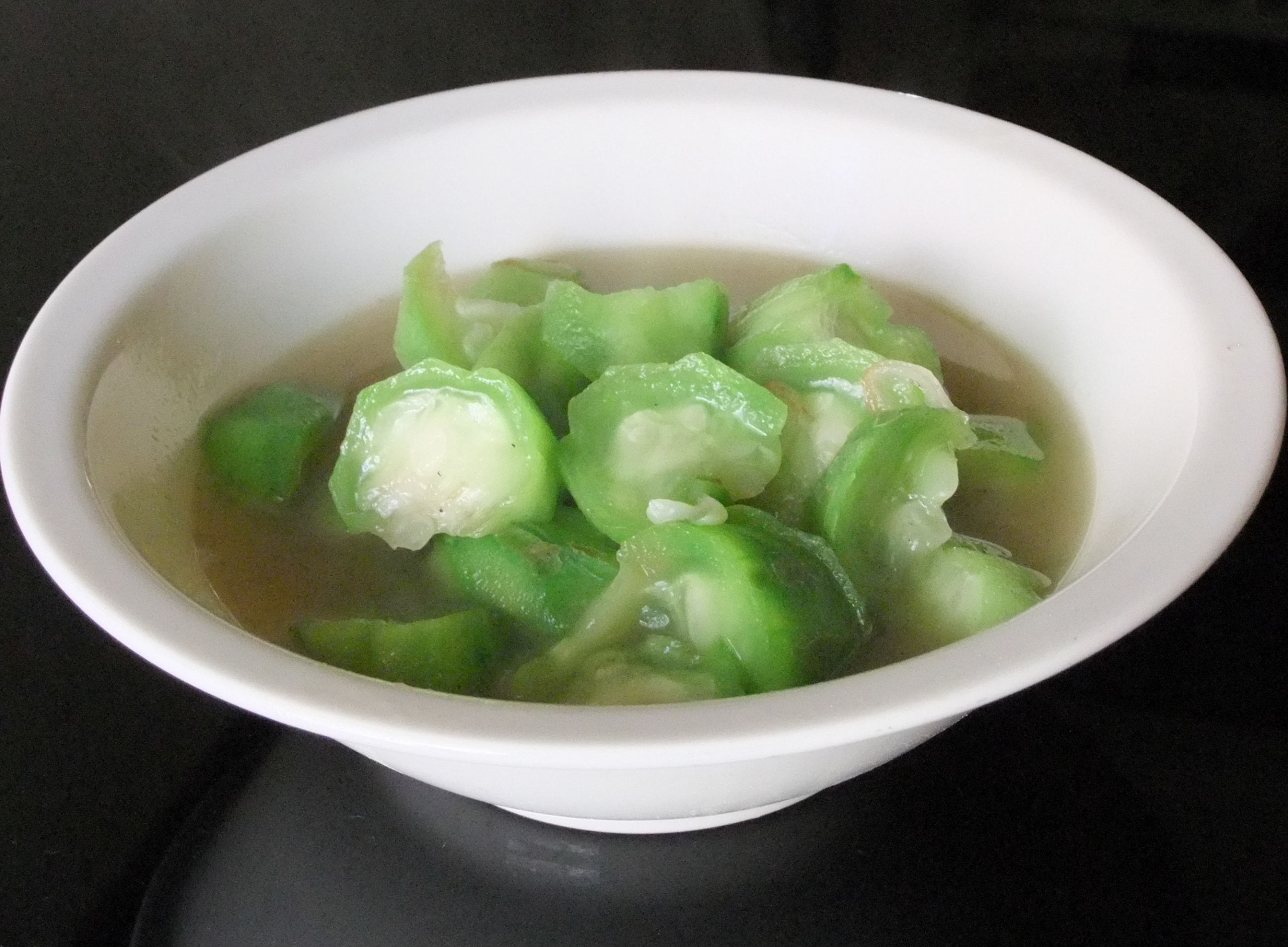
Indonesian food includes many vegetables as ingredients, like this sayur oyong made with Luffa acutangula.

A number of leaf vegetables are widely used in Indonesian cuisine, such as kangkung, spinach, genjer, melinjo, papaya and cassava leaves. These are often sauteed with garlic. Spinach and corn are used in clear, watery vegetable soups like sayur bayam bening, flavoured with temu kunci, garlic and shallot. Clear vegetable soup includes sayur oyong. Other vegetables, like calabash, chayote, kelor, yardlong bean, eggplant, gambas and belustru, are cut and used in stir-fries, curries and soups like sayur asem, sayur lodeh or laksa. Daun ubi tumbuk is a pounded cassava leaves dish, found in Sumatra, Kalimantan and Sulawesi. Sayur sop is cabbage, cauliflower, potato, carrot, with macaroni spiced with black pepper, garlic and shallot in chicken or beef broth. Similar mixed vegetables are also stir-fried as cap cai, a popular dish of the Chinese Indonesian cuisine. Tumis kangkung is a popular stir-fried water spinach dish.

Vegetables like winged bean, tomato, cucumber and small bitter melon are commonly eaten raw, like in lalab. The large bitter melon variety is usually boiled. Kecombrang and papaya flower buds are a common Indonesian vegetable. Urap is seasoned and spiced shredded coconut mixed together with vegetables. Asinan betawi are preserved vegetables. Gado-gado and pecel are a salad of boiled vegetables dressed in a peanut-based spicy sauce, while karedok is its raw version.

=== Vegetarianism in Indonesia ===
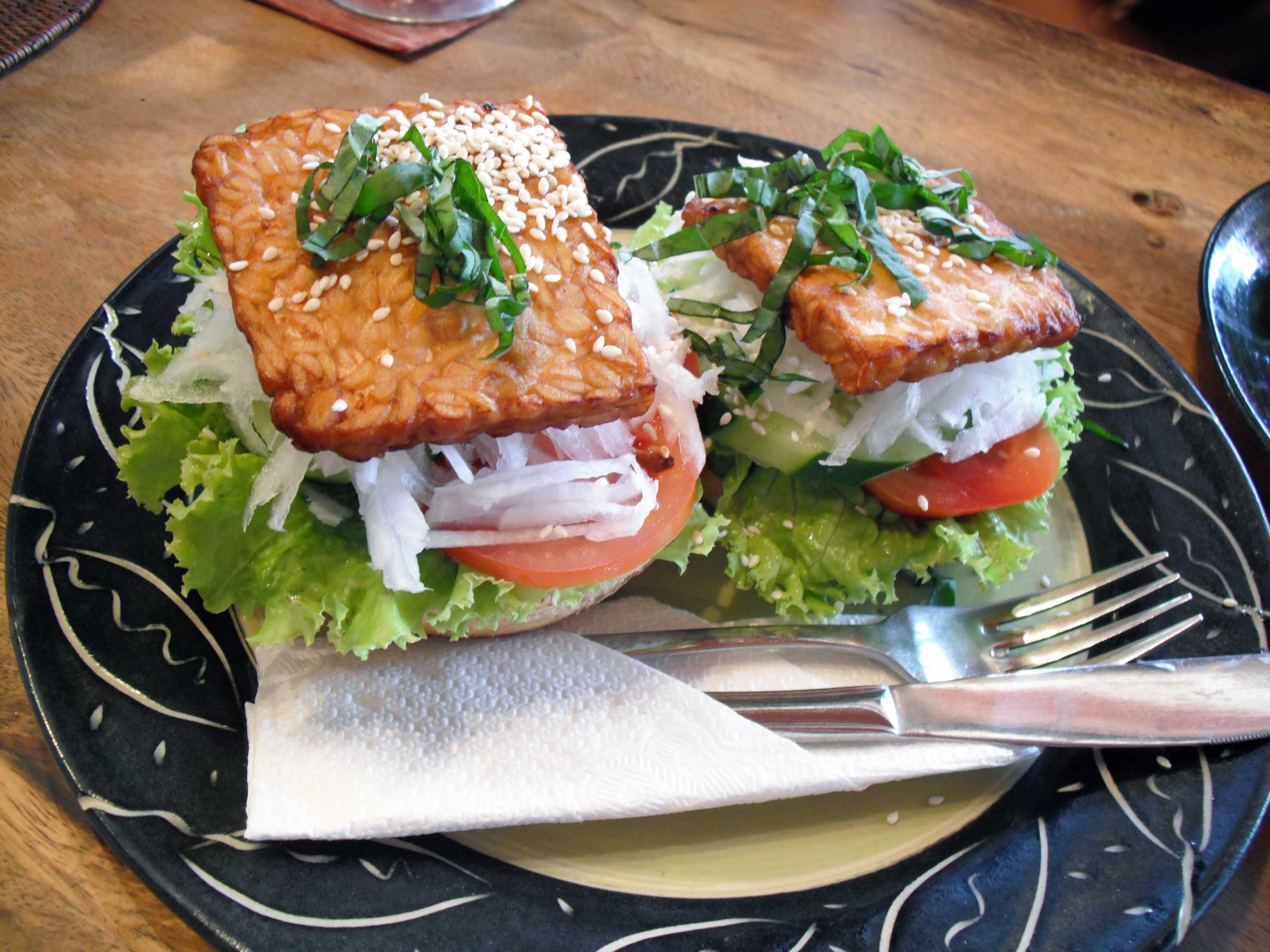
Tempeh burger, a fusion vegan dish

Vegetarianism is well represented in Indonesia, as a wide selection of vegetarian dishes and meat substitutes are served. According to a Euromonitor International survey conducted in 2018, Indonesia has the third-highest rate of vegetarianism growth. Dishes such as gado-gado, karedok, ketoprak, tauge goreng, pecel, urap, rujak and asinan are vegetarian dishes. However, dishes that use peanut sauce, such as gado-gado, karedok or ketoprak, might contain small amounts of shrimp paste, called "terasi". Shrimp paste is also often used to add flavour to spicy sambal chili paste served with lalap, assorted fresh vegetables. Fermented soy products, such as tempeh, "tahu" (tofu) and oncom are prevalent as meat substitutes and as a source of vegetable protein. In contemporary fusion cuisine, tempeh is used to replace meat patties and served as tempeh burgers.

Most Indonesians do not practice strict vegetarianism and may consume vegetables or vegetarian dishes for their taste, preference, economic and health reasons. Small numbers of Indonesian Buddhists practice vegetarianism for religious reasons.

== Meat and fish ==
The main animal protein sources in the Indonesian diet are poultry and fish, while meats such as beef, water buffalo, goat and mutton are also commonly found in the Indonesian marketplaces.

=== Poultry ===
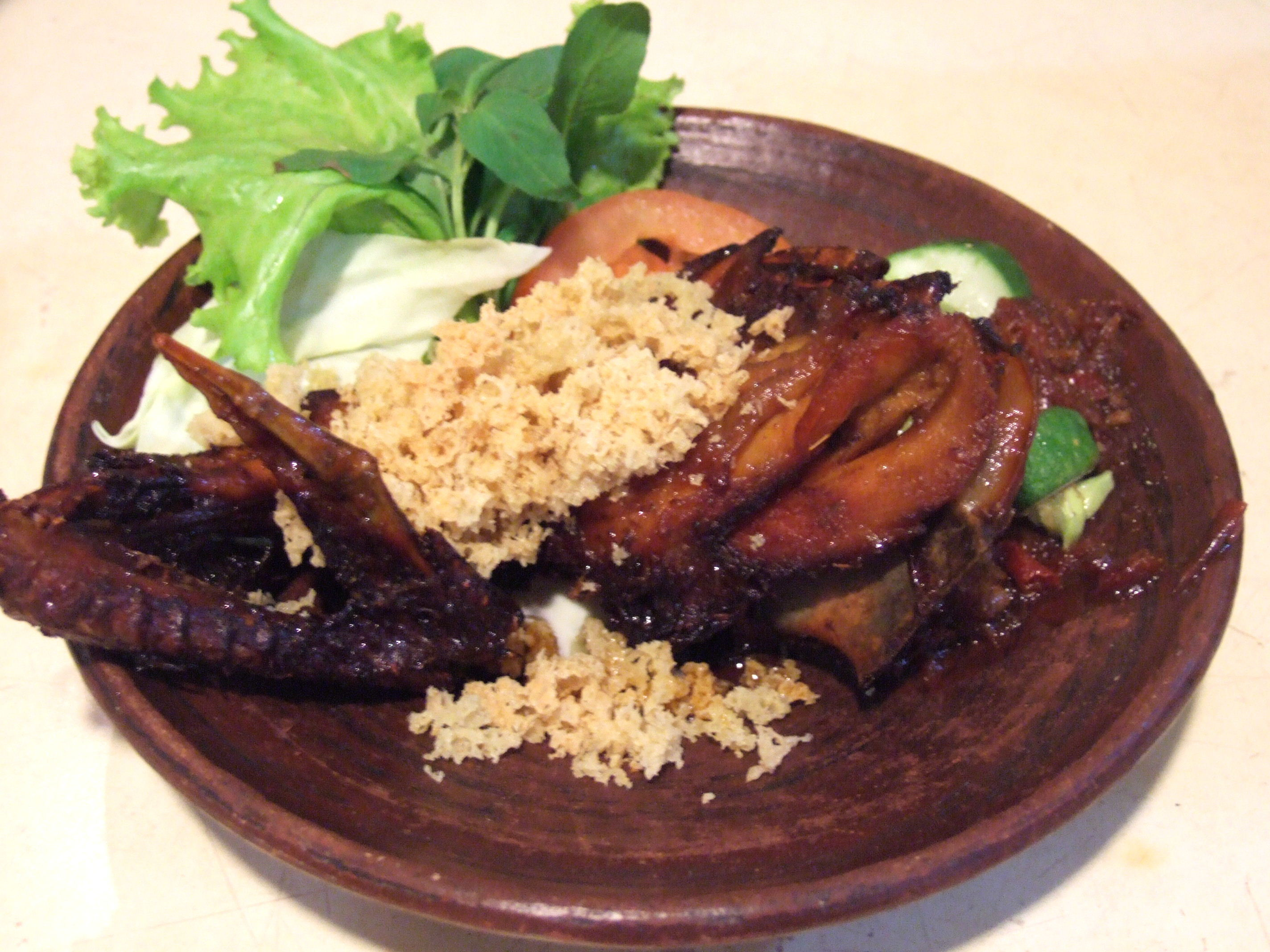
Ayam goreng kalasan, from Kalasan, Yogyakarta

The most common poultry consumed is chicken, followed by duck. Pigeon, quail and wild swamp birds such as watercock are also consumed. Traditionally, Indonesians breed free-range chickens in the villages known as ayam kampung (village chicken). Compared to common mass-farmed chickens, these village chickens are thinner and their meat is slightly firmer.

Various recipes of ayam goreng (fried chicken) and ayam bakar (grilled chicken) are commonly found throughout Indonesia. Other than frying or grilling, chicken might be cooked as soup, such as sup ayam or soto ayam, or cooked in coconut milk as opor ayam. Chicken satay is also commonly found in Indonesia; it is barbecued on skewers and served with peanut sauce. Popular chicken recipes include ayam goreng kalasan from Yogyakarta, ayam bakar padang from Padang, ayam taliwang from Lombok, ayam betutu from Bali, and ayam goreng lengkuas (galangal fried chicken).

=== Meat ===
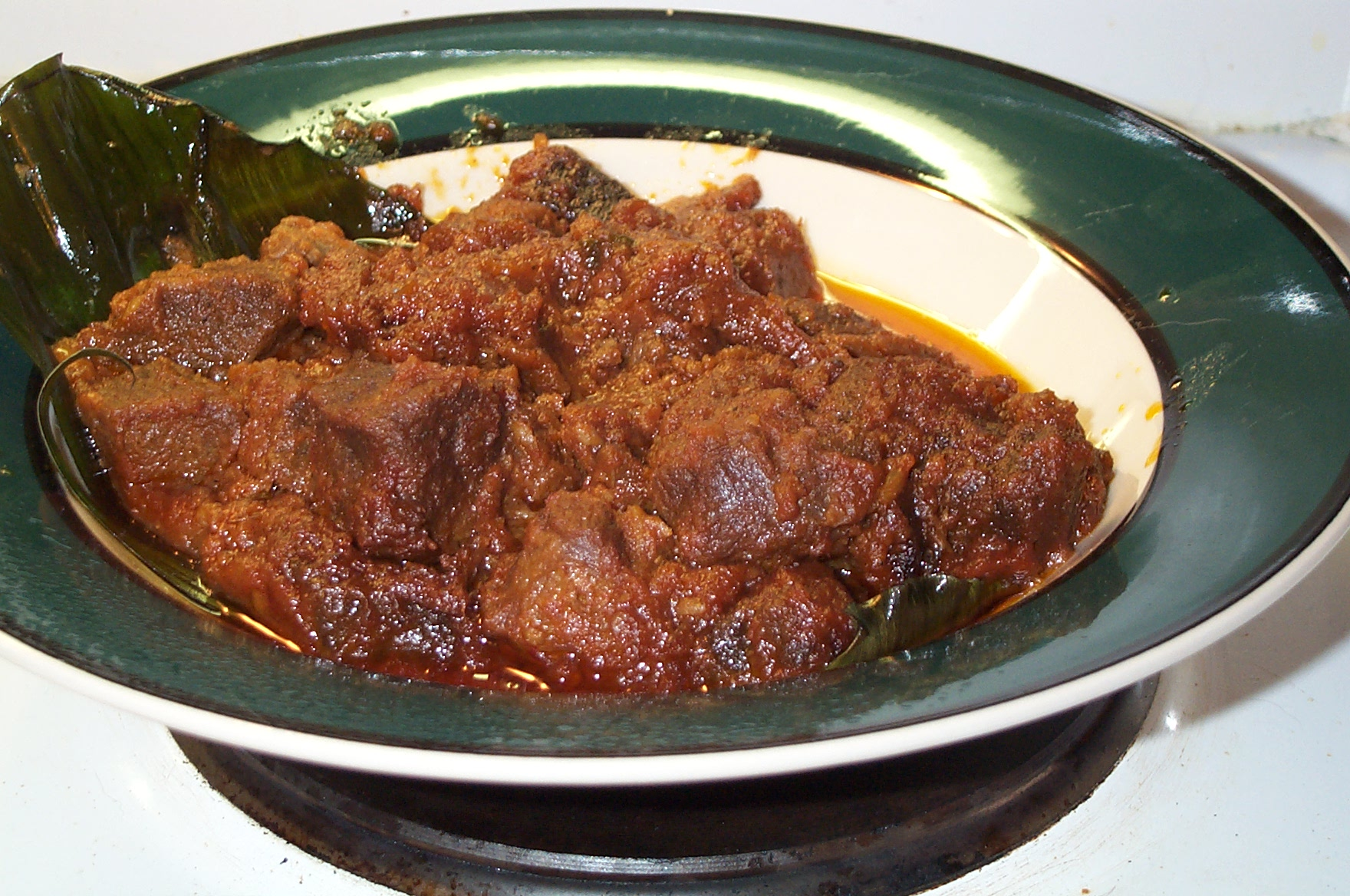
Rendang daging, a beef, mutton or goat meat dish, that has been marinated with various different spices for several hours, and slow-cooked with coconut milk

Beef and goat meat are the most commonly consumed meats in Indonesia, while kerbau (water buffalo) and domestic sheep are also consumed to a lesser degree, since water buffalo are more useful for ploughing the rice paddies, while sheep are kept for their wool or to be used for the traditional entertainment of ram fighting. As a country with an Islamic majority, Indonesian Muslims follow the Islamic halal dietary law which forbids the consumption of pork.

In other parts of Indonesia where there are significant numbers of non-Muslims, boar and pork are commonly consumed. Dishes made of non-halal meats can be found in provinces such as Bali, North Sumatra, North Sulawesi, East Nusa Tenggara, Maluku, West Kalimantan, Central Kalimantan, North Kalimantan, West Papua, Papua, and also in the Chinatowns of major Indonesian cities. Today to cater for the larger Muslim market, most of the restaurants and eating establishments in Indonesia put halal signs that signify that they serve neither pork nor any non-halal meats, nor do they use lard in their cooking. With a large Muslim population and a relatively small number of cattle, today Indonesians rely heavily on imported beef from Australia, New Zealand, India and the United States which often results in a scarcity and raised prices of beef in the Indonesian market.

The meat can be cooked in rich spices and coconut milk such as beef, goat or lamb rendang, skewered, seasoned and grilled chicken or mutton as satay, barbecued meats, or sliced and cooked in rich broth soup as soto. Muttons and various offals can be use as ingredients for soto soup or gulai curry. In Bali, with its Hindu majority, the babi guling (pig roast) is popular among locals as well as non-Muslim visitors, while the Batak people of North Sumatra have babi panggang that is a similar dish. Wild boar are also commonly consumed in Papua. The meat also can be processed to be thinly sliced and dried as dendeng (jerky), or made into abon (meat floss). Dendeng celeng is Indonesian "dried, jerked" boar meat. Raised rabbits are also consumed as food in mountainous region of Indonesia.

Some game meat such as venison might be sold and consumed in some areas of Indonesia. In Kalimantan, West Nusa Tenggara, East Nusa Tenggara, and Papua, deer meat can be found, usually wildly acquired by hunting. Other unusual and often controversial exotic meats include frog legs and softshell turtle consumed in Chinese Indonesian and Javanese cuisine, horse meat consumed in Yogyakarta, West Nusa Tenggara, and South Sulawesi, turtle meat consumed in Bali and Eastern Indonesia, snake, biawak (monitor lizard), paniki (fruit bats), dog meat, cat meat, and field rats consumed in Minahasan cuisine of North Sulawesi. Batak cuisine of North Sumatra is also familiar with cooking dog meat, while its consumption is diminishing in Central Java. Exotic and rare game meat such as crocodile, squirrel, civet, and monkey might also be sold and consumed in wilder parts of Indonesia.

=== Fish ===
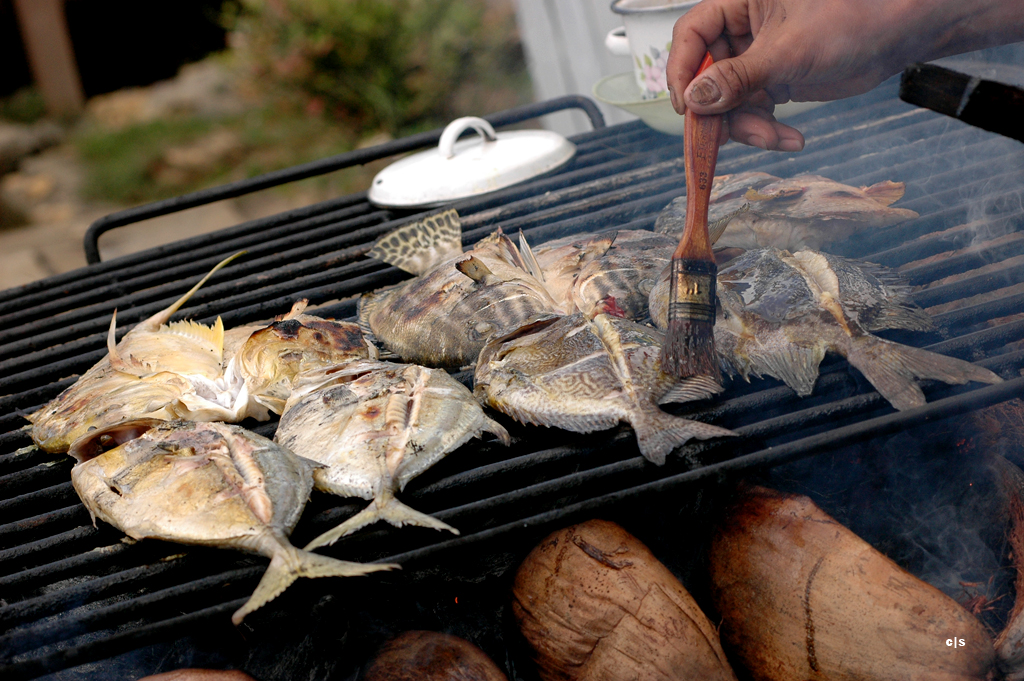
Grilling ikan bakar baronang in Mamuju, West Sulawesi

In an archipelagic nation, seafood is abundant, and it is commonly consumed especially by Indonesian residents in coastal areas. Fish is especially popular in the eastern Indonesian regions of Sulawesi and Maluku, where most of the people work as fishermen. Both areas have a vast sea which brings them many different kinds of seafood.

Popular seafood in Indonesian cuisine includes skipjack tuna, tuna, mackerel, pomfret, wahoo, milkfish, trevally, rabbitfish, abalistes stellatus, amberjacks, rastrelliger, yellowtail scad, nemipterus japonicus, garoupa, red snapper, anchovy, swordfish, shark, stingray, squid or cuttlefish, octopus, shrimp, crab, blue crab, blood clam, razor clam and mussel.

Seafood is commonly consumed across Indonesia, but it is especially popular in Maluku islands, Gorontalo Peninsula and Minahasa (North Sulawesi) cuisine. Seafood is usually grilled, boiled or fried. Ikan bakar is a popular grilled fish dish that can be found throughout Indonesia. The method of cooking like stir fried in spices or in soup is also possible. Salted fish is preserved seafood through cured in salt, it also can be found in Indonesian market.

Fresh water fisheries can be found in inland regions or in areas with large rivers or lakes. Fresh water fishes are popular in Sundanese cuisine of West Java, caught or raised in Lake Toba in Batak lands of North Sumatra, or taken from large rivers in Malay lands of Riau, Jambi and South Sumatra, or large rivers in Kalimantan. Popular fresh water fish among others; carp, gourami, catfish, pangasius (especially the iridescent shark), snakehead, trichogaster, climbing gourami, Nile tilapia, and Mozambique tilapia. Freshwater snails such as pila ampullacea, is also consumed in the country, either by boiling or grilling it's meat as a satay.

=== Insects ===
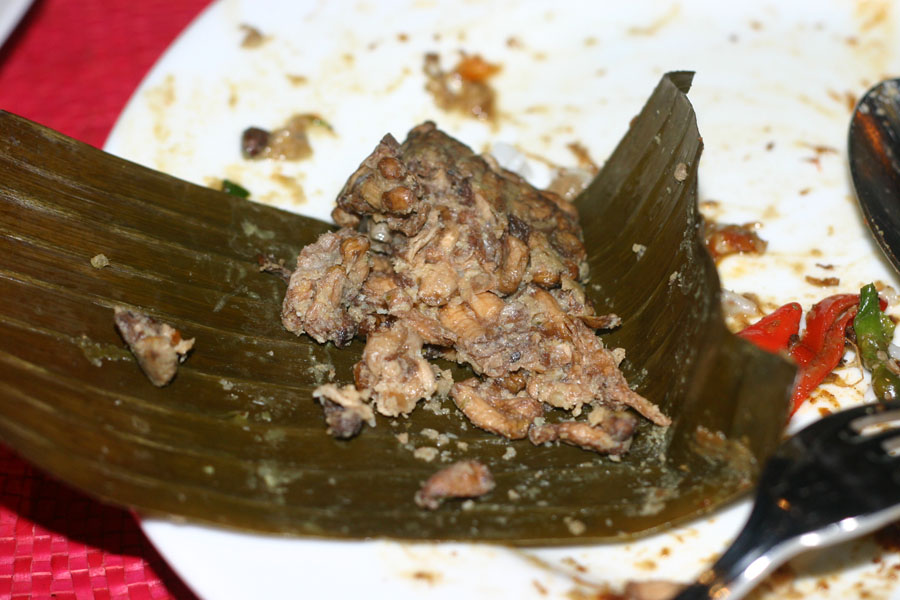
Botok tawon, botok made from bee larvae

Unlike Thailand, in Indonesia insect is not a popular food ingredient nor widely available as street food. In Java, locals do catch, breed and sell certain species of insects, usually sold fresh or alive as pet bird feed. Nevertheless, traditionally several cultures in Indonesia are known to consume insects, especially grasshopper, cricket, termite, also the larvae of sago palm weevil, bee and dragonfly. In Java and Kalimantan, grasshoppers and crickets are usually lightly battered and deep fried in palm oil as crispy kripik snack. Smaller grasshoppers, crickets and termites might be made as rempeyek batter cracker which resembles insect fossil. During monsoon rainy season, flying termites are abundant being attracted to lightbulbs to mate. Locals usually put a bucket of water under the lamp to trap the flying termites, pluck the wings, and roast the termites as additional protein-rich snack. In Banyuwangi, East Java, there is a specialty dish called botok tawon (honeybee botok), which is beehives that contains bee larvae, being seasoned in shredded coconut and spices, wrapped inside banana leaf package and steamed. Dayak tribes of Kalimantan, also Moluccans and Papuan tribes in Eastern Indonesia, are known to consumes ulat sagu (lit. sagoo caterpillar) or larvae of sago palm weevil. This protein-rich larvae are considered a delicacy in Papua, and often being roasted prior of consumption. Locals may also commonly eat the larvae raw or alive. In Bali, dragonflies are also consumed by processing them into pepes.

== Spices and other flavourings ==
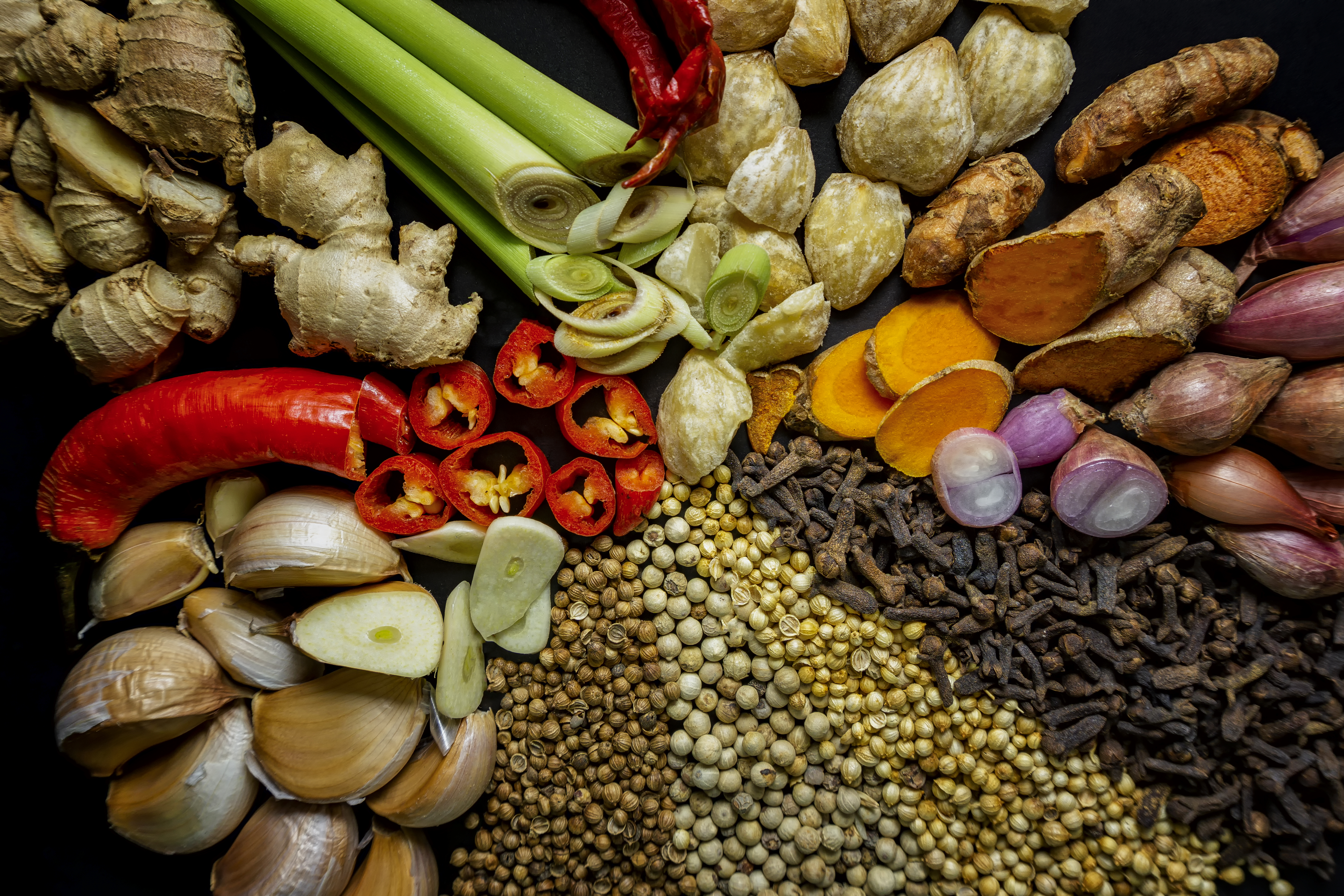
Various Indonesian spices

"Rempah" is the Indonesian word for spice, while "bumbu" is the Indonesian word for a spice mixture or seasoning, and it commonly appears in the names of certain spice mixtures, sauces and seasoning pastes.

Known throughout the world as the "Spice Islands", the Indonesian islands of Maluku contributed to the introduction of its native spices to world cuisine. Spices such as nutmeg or mace, clove, pandan leaves, keluwak and galangal are native to Indonesia. It is likely that black pepper, turmeric, lemongrass, shallot, cinnamon, candlenut, coriander and tamarind were introduced from India, while ginger, scallions and garlic were introduced from China. Those spices from mainland Asia were introduced early, in ancient times, thus they became integral ingredients in Indonesian cuisine.

In ancient times, the kingdom of Sunda and the later sultanate of Banten were well known as the world's major producers of black pepper. The maritime empires of Srivijaya and Majapahit also benefited from the lucrative spice trade between the spice islands with China and India. Later the Dutch East India Company controlled the spice trade between Indonesia and the world.

=== Sambal ===
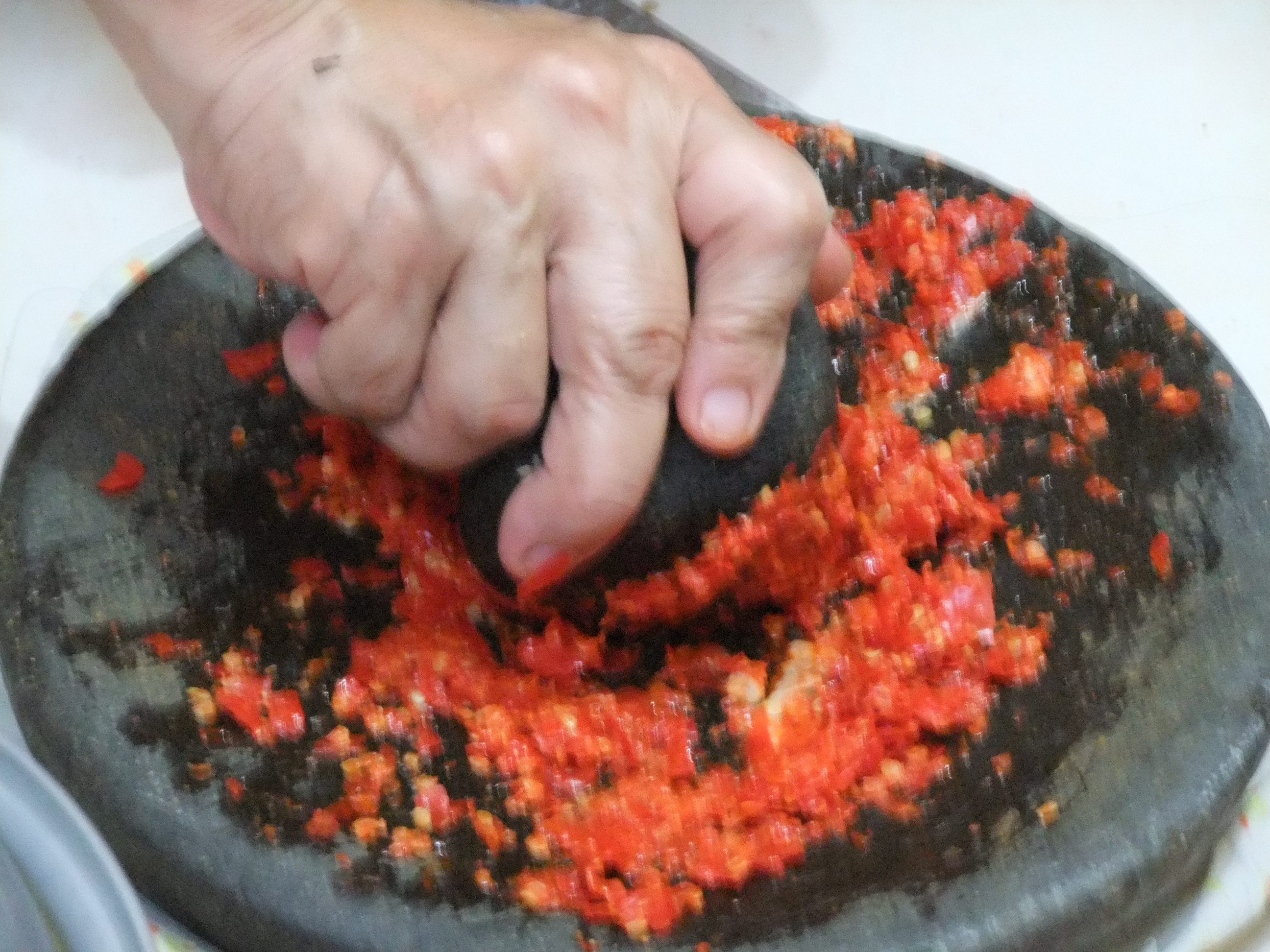
Sambal ulek, a common Indonesian spicy condiment

The Indonesian fondness for hot and spicy food was enriched when the Spanish introduced chili pepper from the New World to the region in the 16th century. After that hot and spicy sambals have become an important part of Indonesian cuisine.

Indonesia has perhaps the richest variants of sambals. In the Indonesian archipelago, there are as many as 300 varieties of sambal. The intensity ranges from mild to very hot. Sambal evolved into many variants across Indonesia, ones of the most popular is sambal terasi (sambal belacan) and sambal mangga muda (unripe mango sambal). Sambal terasi is a combination of chilies, sharp fermented shrimp paste called terasi, tangy lime juice, sugar and salt all pounded up with mortar and pestle. Dabu-dabu is a combined Gorontalo and North Sulawesi style of sambal with chopped fresh tomato, chili, and lime juice.

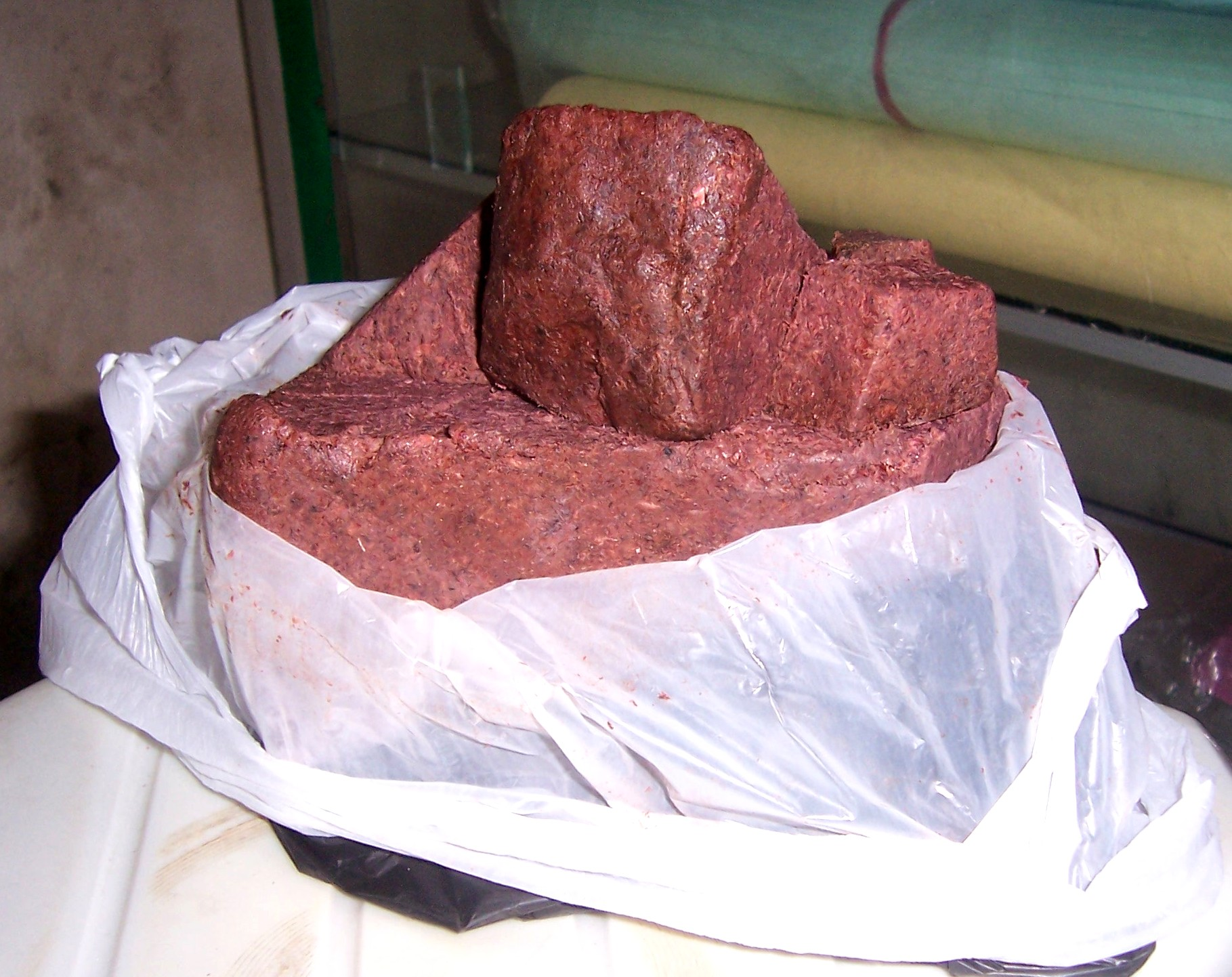
The savoury and sweet shrimp paste from Lombok, West Nusa Tenggara, is called lengkare or terasi lombok

Sambal, especially sambal ulek, or sambal terasi can also become a base ingredient for many dishes, such as sambal raja (a dish from Kutai), terong balado, dendeng balado, ayam bumbu rujak, sambal goreng ati, among other things.

=== Sauces and seasonings ===
Soy sauce is also an important flavourings in Indonesian cuisine. Kecap asin (salty or common soy sauce) was adopted from Chinese cuisine, however Indonesian developed their own kecap manis (sweet soy sauce) with generous addition of palm sugar into soy sauce. Sweet soy sauce is an important marinade for barbecued meat and fish, such as satay and grilled fishes. Sweet soy sauce is also an important ingredient for semur, Indonesian stew.

=== Peanut sauce ===
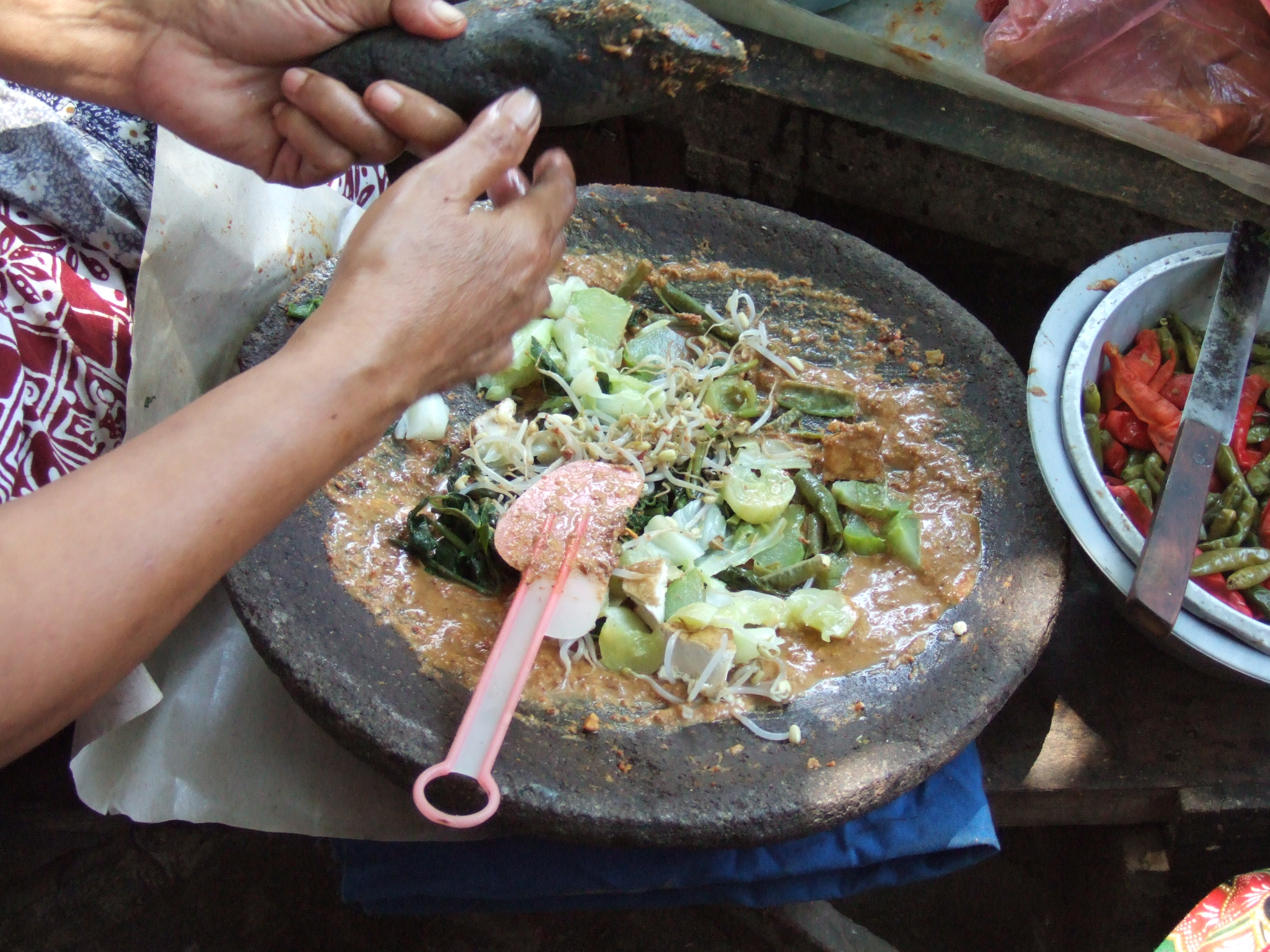
Peanut sauce is an important part of gado-gado.

One of the main characteristics of Indonesian cuisine is the wide application of peanuts in many Indonesian signature dishes, such as satay, gado-gado, karedok, ketoprak, and pecel. All of these dishes applied ample of bumbu kacang (peanut sauce) for flavouring. Gado-gado and satay, for example, have been considered Indonesian national dishes.

Introduced from Mexico by Portuguese and Spanish merchants in the 16th century, peanuts assumed a place within Indonesian cuisine as a key ingredient. Peanuts thrived in the tropical environment of Southeast Asia, and today they can be found, roasted and chopped finely, in many recipes. Whole, halved, or crushed peanuts are used to garnish a variety of dishes, and used in marinades and dipping sauces such as sambal kacang (a mixture of ground chilies and fried peanuts) for otak-otak or ketan. Peanut oil, extracted from peanuts, is one of the most commonly used cooking oils in Indonesia.

Bumbu kacang or peanut sauce represents a sophisticated, earthy seasoning rather than a sweet, gloppy sauce. It should have a delicate balance of savoury, sweet, sour, and spicy flavours, acquired from various ingredients, such as fried peanuts, gula jawa (coconut sugar), garlic, shallots, ginger, tamarind, lemon juice, lemongrass, salt, chilli, peppercorns, sweet soy sauce, ground together and mixed with water to form the right consistency. The secret to good peanut sauce is "not too thick and not too watery". Indonesian peanut sauce tends to be less sweet than the Thai version, which is a hybrid adaptation. Gado-gado is a popular dish particularly associated with bumbu kacang, and is eaten across Indonesia.

=== Coconut milk ===
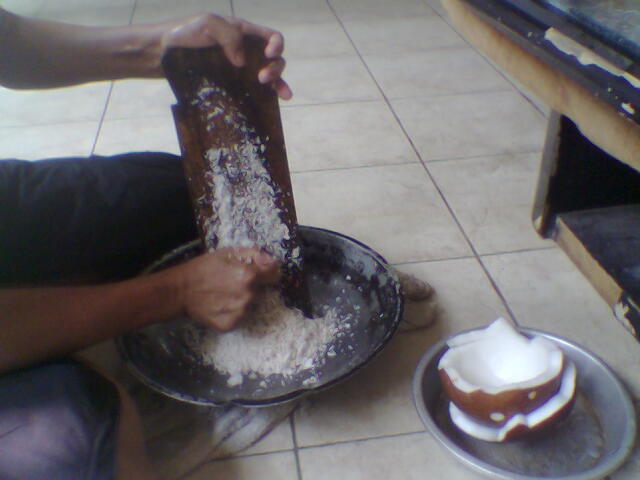
Shredding coconut flesh to make coconut milk

Coconuts are abundant in tropical Indonesia, and since ancient times Indonesians developed many and various uses for this plant. The broad use of coconut milk in dishes throughout the archipelago is another common characteristic of Indonesian cuisine. It is used in recipes ranging from savoury dishes – such as rendang, soto, gulai, mie koclok, sayur lodeh, gudeg, and opor ayam – to desserts – such as es cendol and es doger.

The use of coconut milk is not exclusive to Indonesian cuisine. It can also be found in Indian, Samoan, Thai, Malaysian, Filipino, and Brazilian cuisines. Nonetheless, the use of coconut milk is quite extensive in Indonesia, especially in Minangkabau cuisine and Gorontalese cuisine, although in Minahasan (North Sulawesi) cuisine, coconut milk is generally absent, except in Minahasan cakes and desserts such as klappertaart.

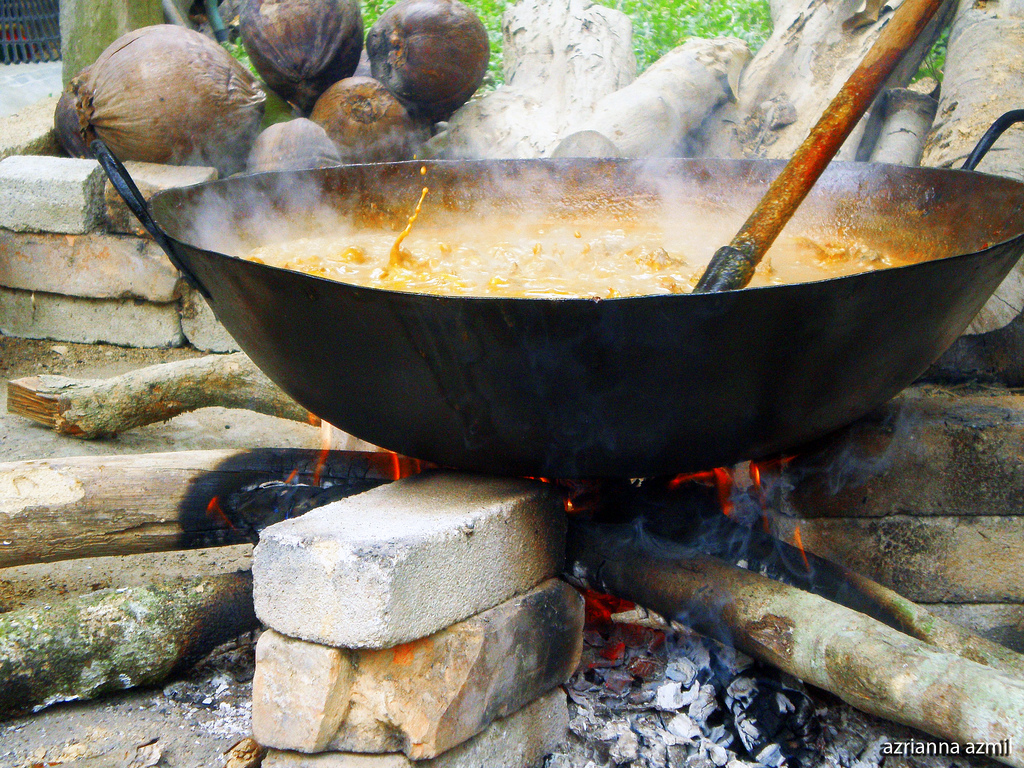
Cooking gulai, a type of spicy Indonesian curry, in ample of spices and coconut milk

In Indonesian cuisine, two types of coconut milk are found, thin coconut milk and thick coconut milk. The difference depends on the water and oil content. Thin coconut milk is usually used for soups such as sayur lodeh and soto, while the thicker variety is used for rendang and desserts. It can be made from freshly shredded coconut meat in traditional markets, or can be found processed in cartons at the supermarket.

After the milk has been extracted from the shredded coconut flesh to make coconut milk, the ampas kelapa (leftover coconut flesh) can still be used in urap, seasoned and spiced shredded coconut meat mixed together with vegetables. Leftover shredded coconut can also be cooked, sauteed and seasoned to make serundeng, almost powdery sweet and spicy finely shredded coconut. Kerisik paste, added to thicken rendang, is another use of coconut flesh. To acquire a rich taste, some households insist on using freshly shredded coconut, instead of leftover, for urap and serundeng. Serundeng can be mixed with meat in dishes such as serundeng daging (beef serundeng) or sprinkled on top of other dishes such as soto or ketan (sticky rice). An example of the heavy use of coconut is burasa from Makassar, rice wrapped in banana leaf cooked with coconut milk and sprinkled with powdered coconut similar to serundeng.

== Cooking method ==
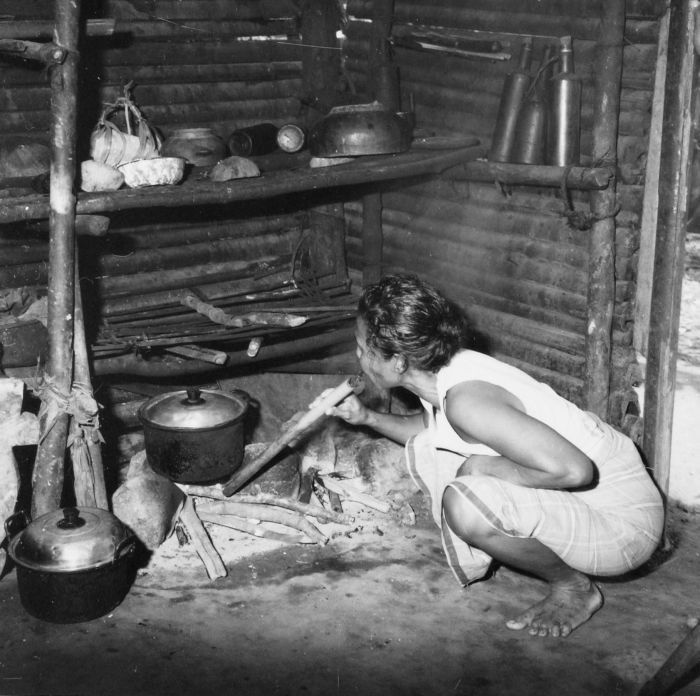
A traditional humble kitchen in Indonesia using firewood for cooking

Most of the common Indonesian dishes are named according to their main ingredients and cooking method. For example, ayam goreng is ayam (chicken) and goreng (frying), which denotes fried chicken. Mie goreng is fried noodle, ikan bakar is grilled fish, udang rebus is boiled shrimp, babi panggang is roasted pork and tumis kangkung is stir fried water spinach. Cooking methods in Indonesian kitchen are goreng (frying) either in a small amount of oil or deep frying with a lot of cooking oil, tumis (stir frying), sangrai (sautéing). Roasting methods are bakar (grilling) usually employing charcoal, firewood, or coconut shell, panggang (baking/roasting) usually refer to baking employing oven. Other methods are rebus (boiling), kukus (steaming) and asap/salai (smoking).

The fire used in cooking can be either a strong fire or a small fire for slow cooking. Cooking nasi goreng usually employs strong fire, while authentic rendang for example requires a small fire for slow cooking of beef, spices, and coconut milk until the meat is caramelised and all the coconut milk's liquid has evaporated. Traditional Indonesian dapur (kitchen) usually employs firewood-fuelled kitchen stove, while the contemporary household today uses liquefied petroleum gas-fuelled stove or an electric stove. The ingredients could be cut into pieces, sliced thinly, or ground into a paste. Cooking utensils are wajan (wok), penggorengan (frying pan), panci (cauldron), knives, several types of spoon and fork, parutan (shredder), cobek and ulekan (stone mortar and pestle). Traditionally Indonesians use a stone mortar and a pestle to grind the spices and ingredients into coarse or fine pastes. Today most households use blender or food processor for the task. Traditional Indonesian cooking wares are usually made from stone, earthenware pottery, wood, and woven bamboo or a rattan container or filter, while contemporary cooking wares, plates and containers use metals – iron, tin, stainless steel, aluminium, ceramics, plastics, and also glass.

== National dishes ==
Indonesian national dishes

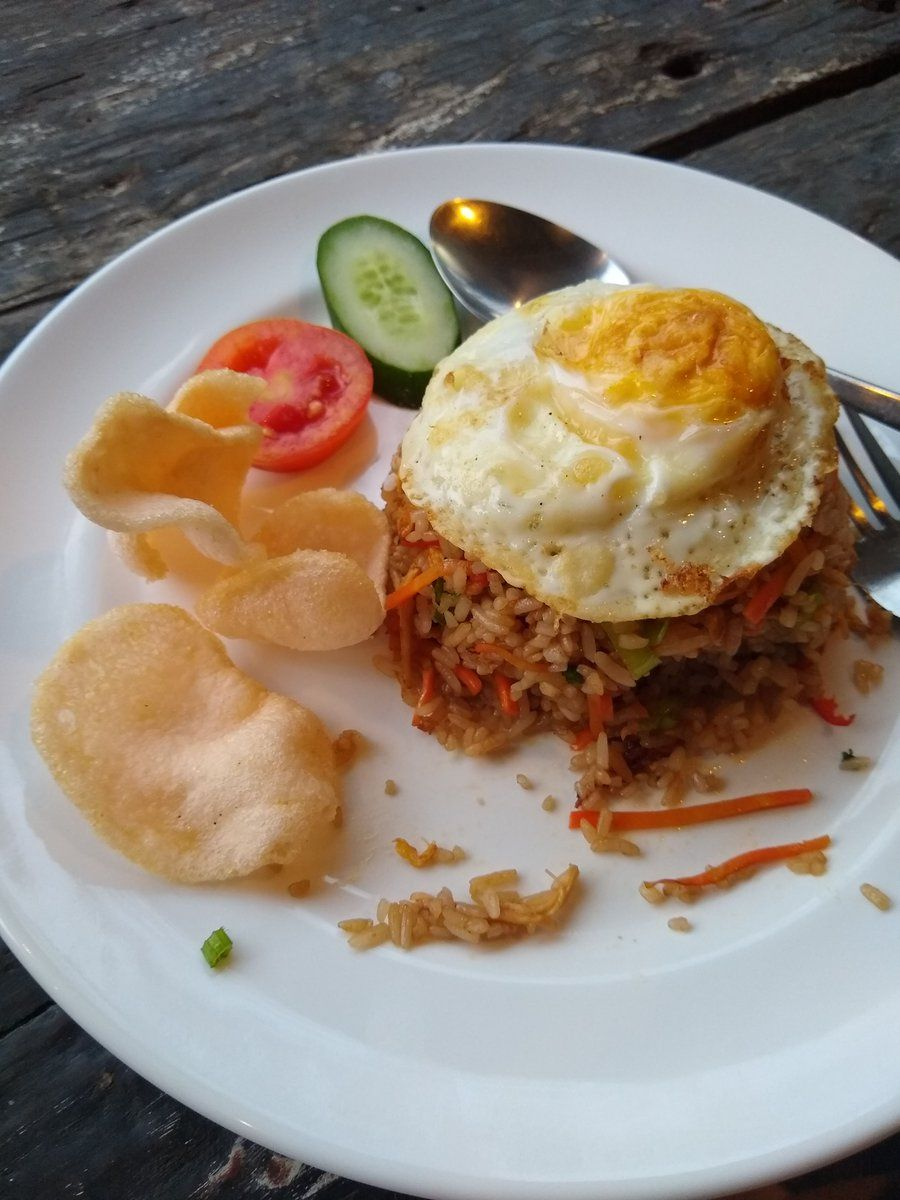
Nasi goreng

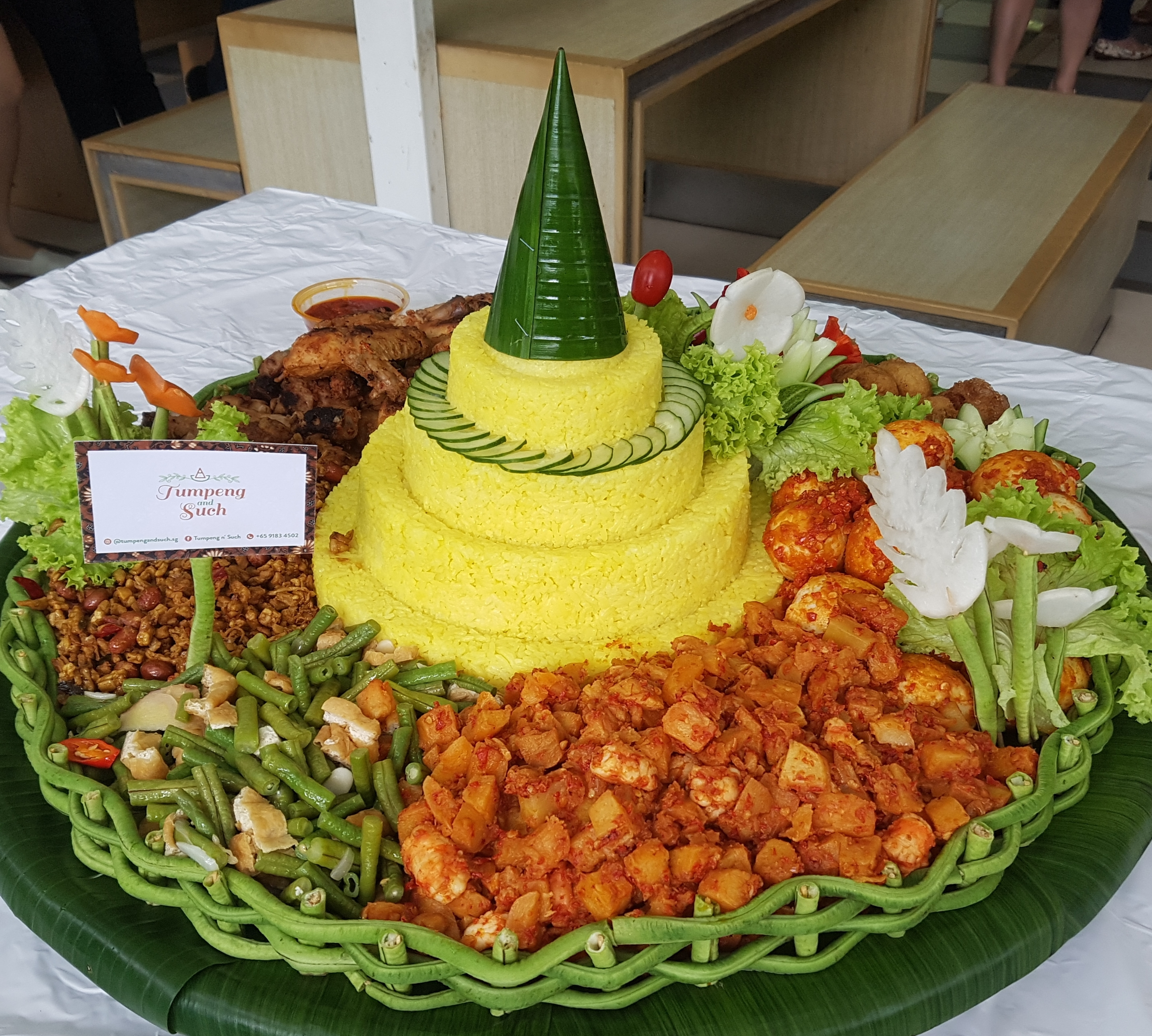
Tumpeng

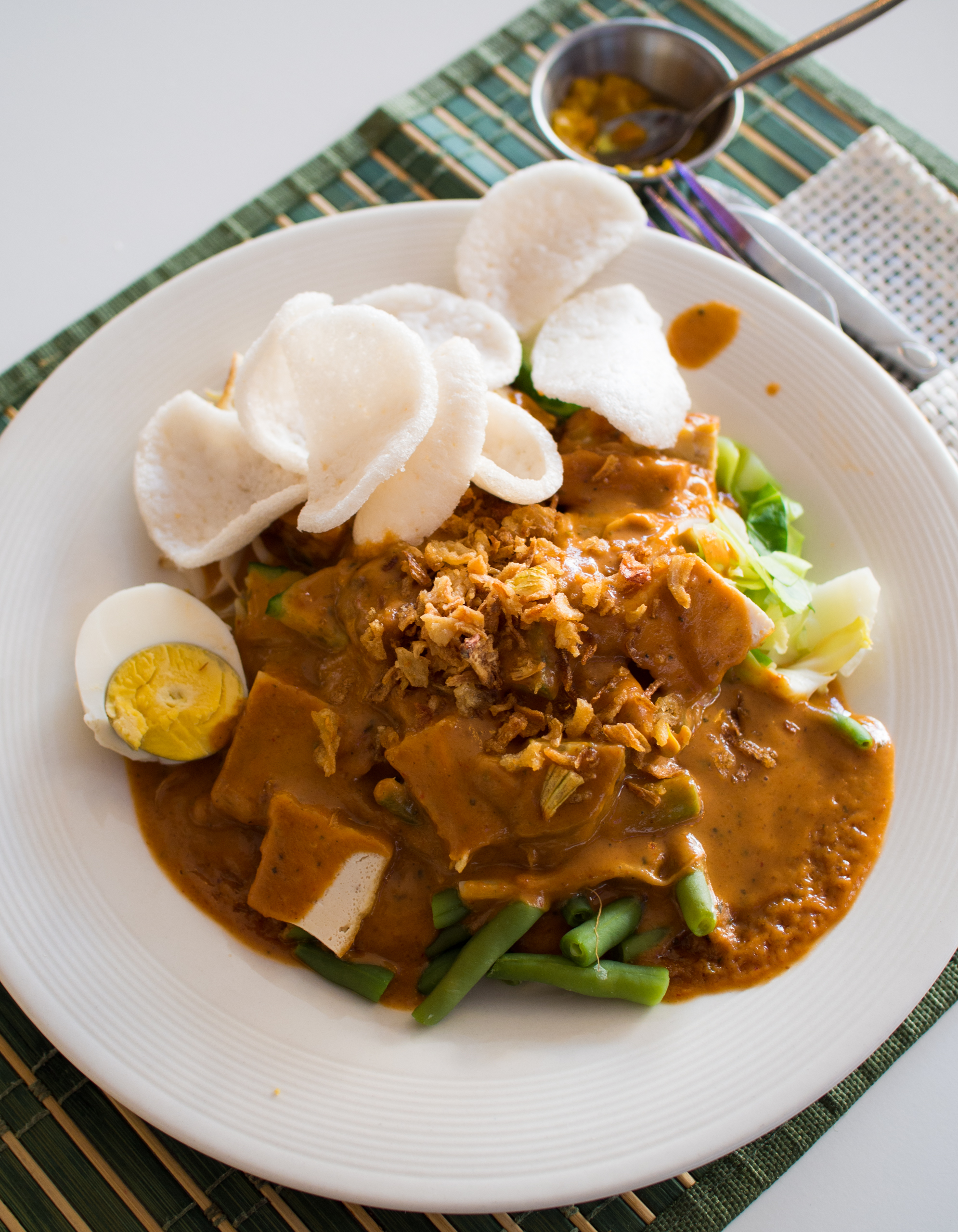
Gado-gado

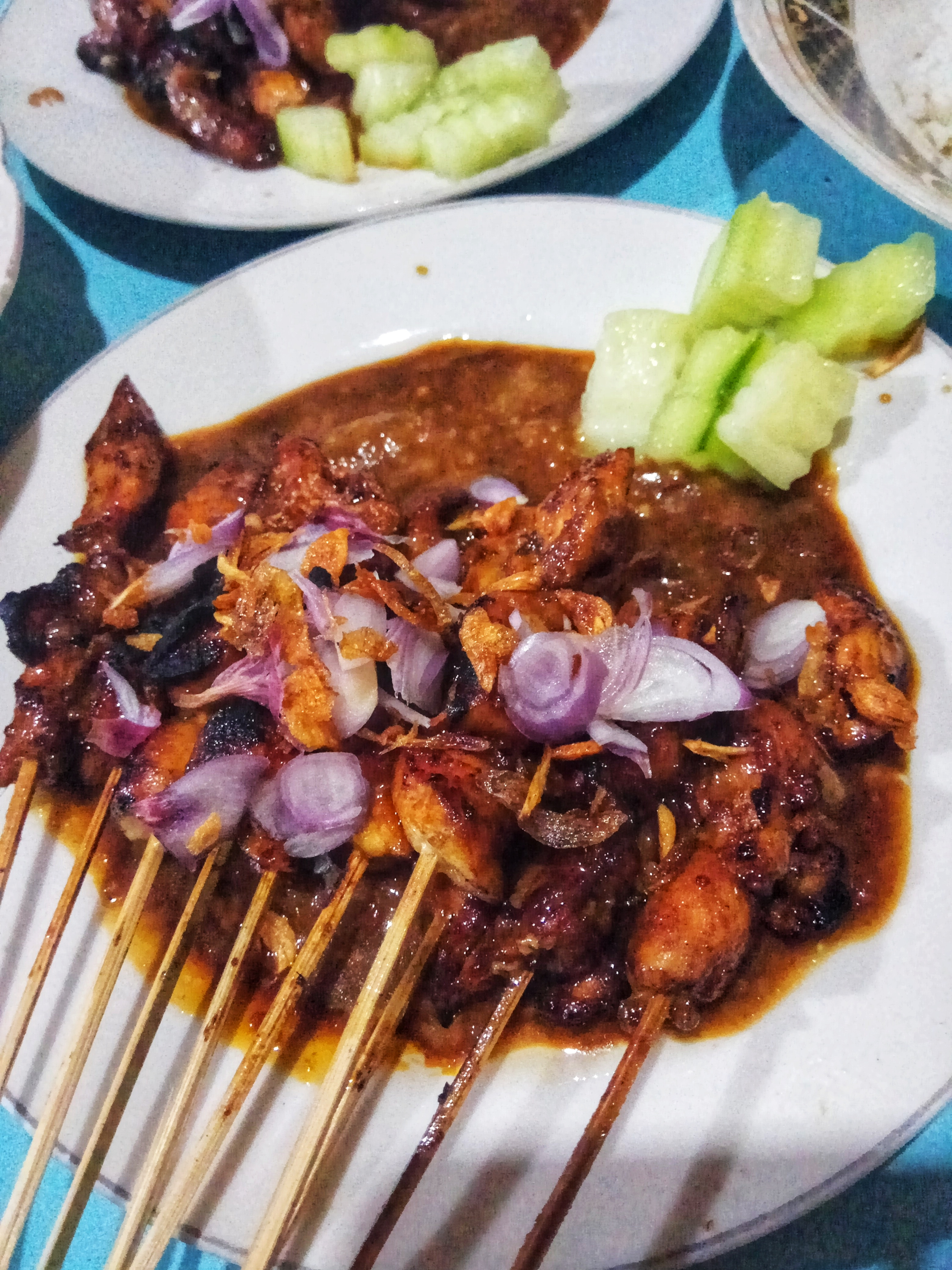
Satay

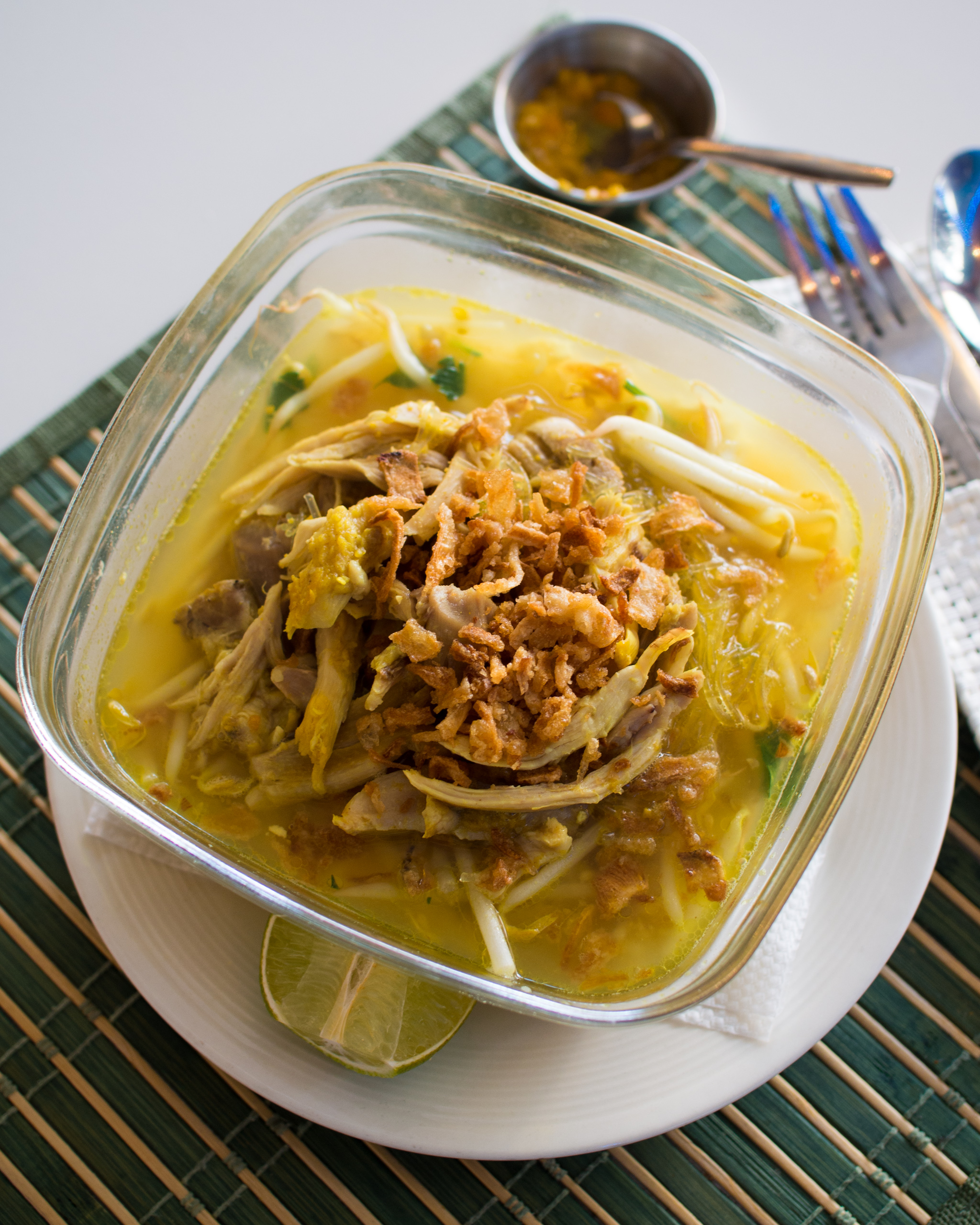
Soto

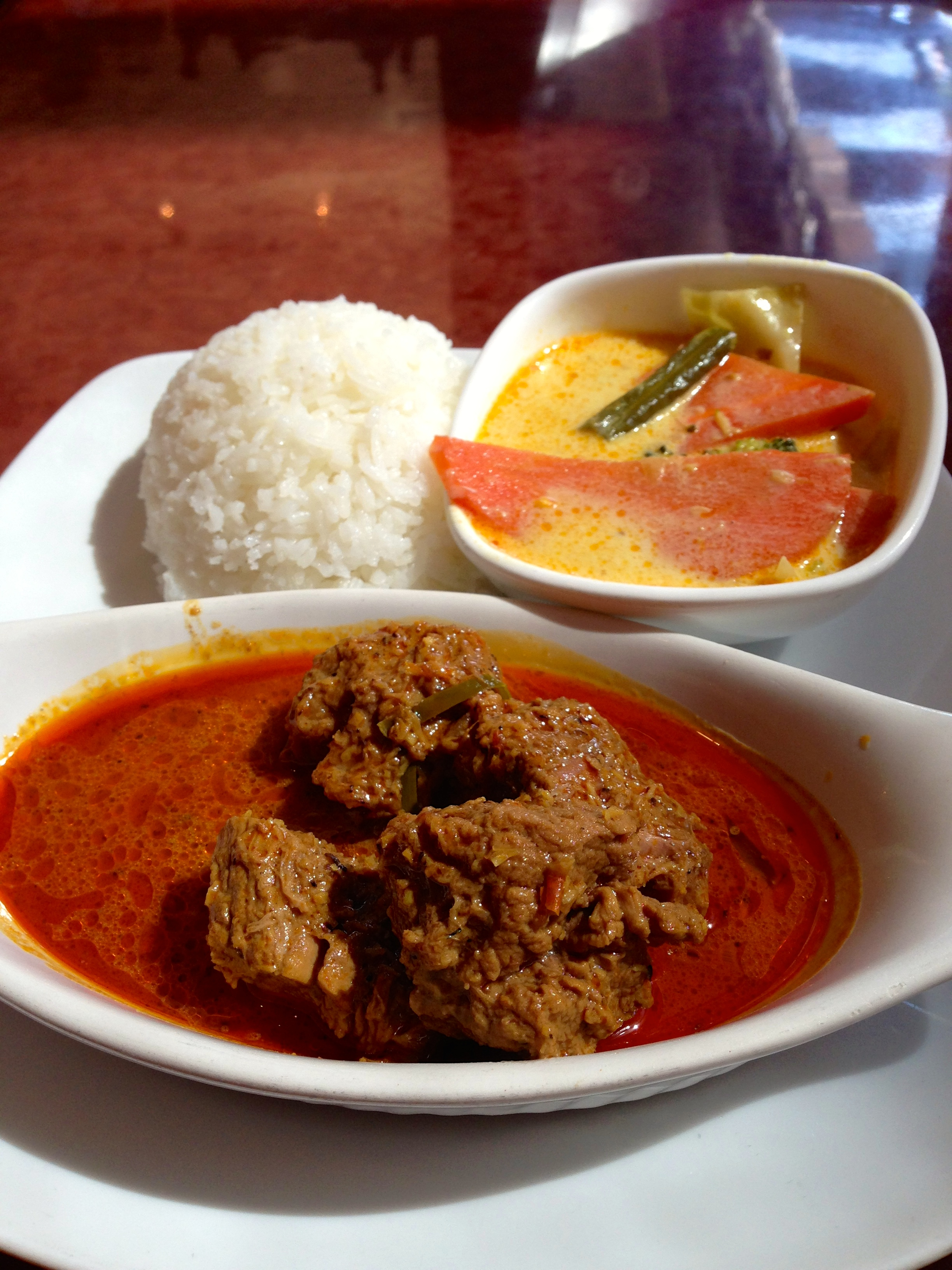
Rendang

Initially during the early years of Indonesian independence, the ubiquitous and highly popular nasi goreng was considered the national dish of the republic, albeit at that time was unofficial. Its simplicity and versatility has contributed to its popularity and made it as a staple among Indonesian households—colloquially considered the most "democratic" dish since the absence of an exact and rigid recipe has allowed people to do anything they want with it.

Nasi goreng that is commonly consumed daily in Indonesian households was considered the quintessential dish that represent an Indonesian family. It is in the menu, introduced, offered and served in Indonesian Theatre Restaurant within the Indonesian pavilion at the 1964 New York World's Fair. Howard Palfrey Jones, the US ambassador to Indonesia during the last years of Sukarno's reign in the mid 1960s, in his memoir "Indonesia: The Possible Dream", said that he likes nasi goreng. He described his fondness for nasi goreng cooked by Hartini, one of Sukarno's wives, and praised it as the most delicious nasi goreng he ever tasted. Nevertheless, other widely popular Indonesian dishes, such as satay, soto and gado-gado are also considered strong contenders. Soto is ubiquitous in Indonesia and considered one of Indonesia's national dishes.

In 2014, the Indonesian Ministry of Tourism and Creative Economy in an effort to promote Indonesian cuisine, has chosen tumpeng as an official Indonesian national dish. Technically tumpeng refer to the rice cone in the center, while the surrounding various dishes might be taken from any choice of various Indonesian dishes—thus was considered ideal as a national dish that binds the diversity of Indonesia's various culinary traditions. Subsequently the designation of tumpeng as the single national dish of Indonesia was considered insufficient to describe the diversity of Indonesian culinary traditions. Later in 2018, the same ministry has chosen another additional 5 national dishes of Indonesia; they are soto, satay, nasi goreng, rendang and gado-gado.

Satay and soto are notable and the natural choice to be promoted as Indonesian national dish, since they had transcends the cultural boundaries of myriad ethnic groups of Indonesia—those dishes has been extremely localised and has branched into various recipes nationwide. For example, there are rich variants of satay and soto recipes throughout Indonesia; from Sumatra to Eastern Indonesia. Each cultures, ethnics, or even cities had adopted these dishes, and thus developed their own version in accordance to their own culture, tradition, creativity, localised taste and preference, also the availability of local ingredients.

== Regional dishes ==
=== Jakarta ===
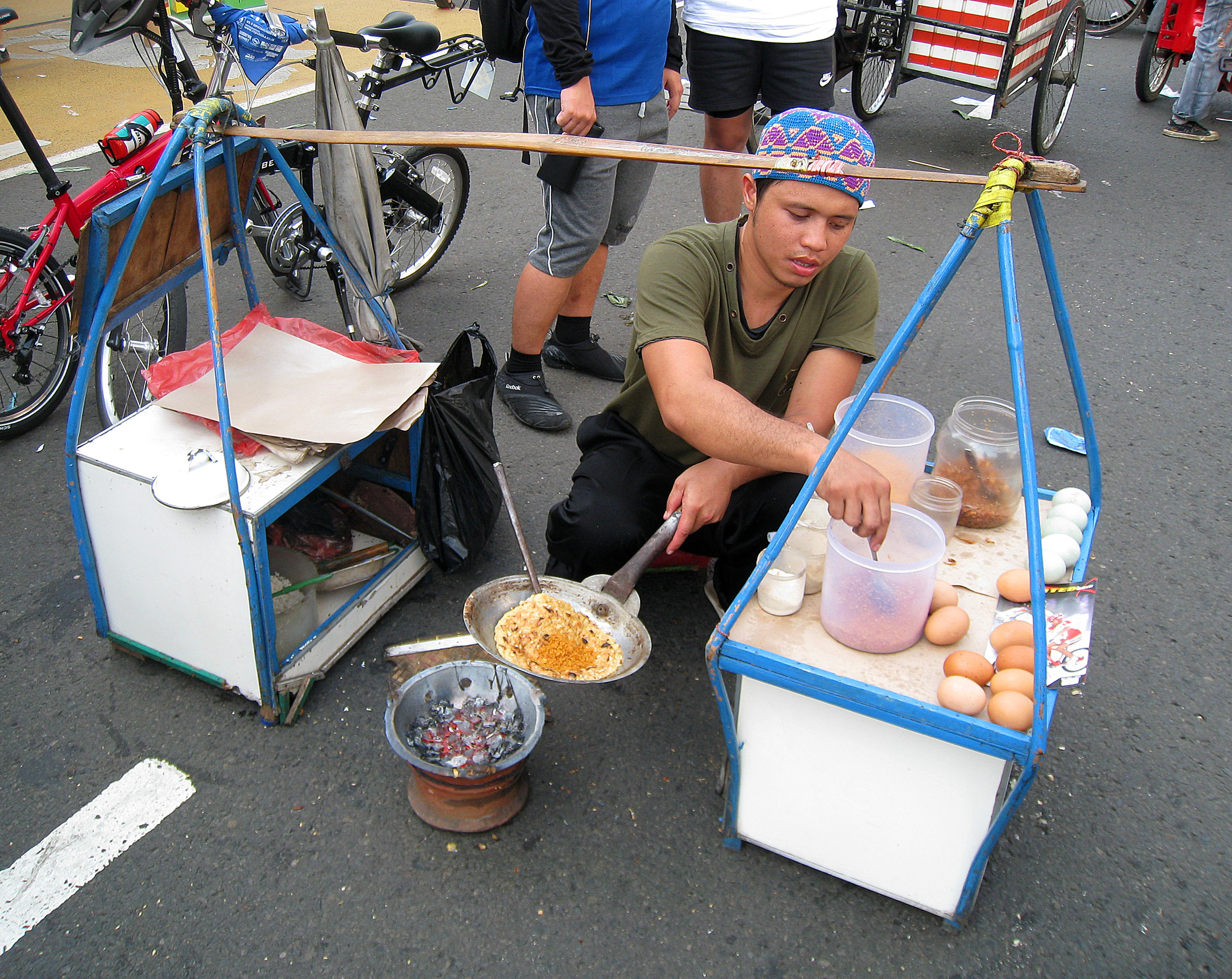
Kerak telor vendor selling spicy coconut omelette, a popular delicacy during Jakarta Fair

Diverse and eclectic, Betawi cuisine of Jakarta draw culinary influences from Chinese, Malay, Sundanese, to Arab, Indian and European. Popular Betawi dishes include nasi uduk (coconut rice), sayur asem (sweet and sour vegetable soup), asinan (salad of pickled vegetables), gado-gado, (boiled or blanched vegetables salad in peanut sauce), ketoprak, (vegetables, tofu, rice vermicelli and rice cake in peanut sauce), and kerak telor (spiced coconut omelette). Born from a creole or hybrid phenomena, the Betawi cuisine is quite similar to the Peranakan cuisine.

=== West Java ===
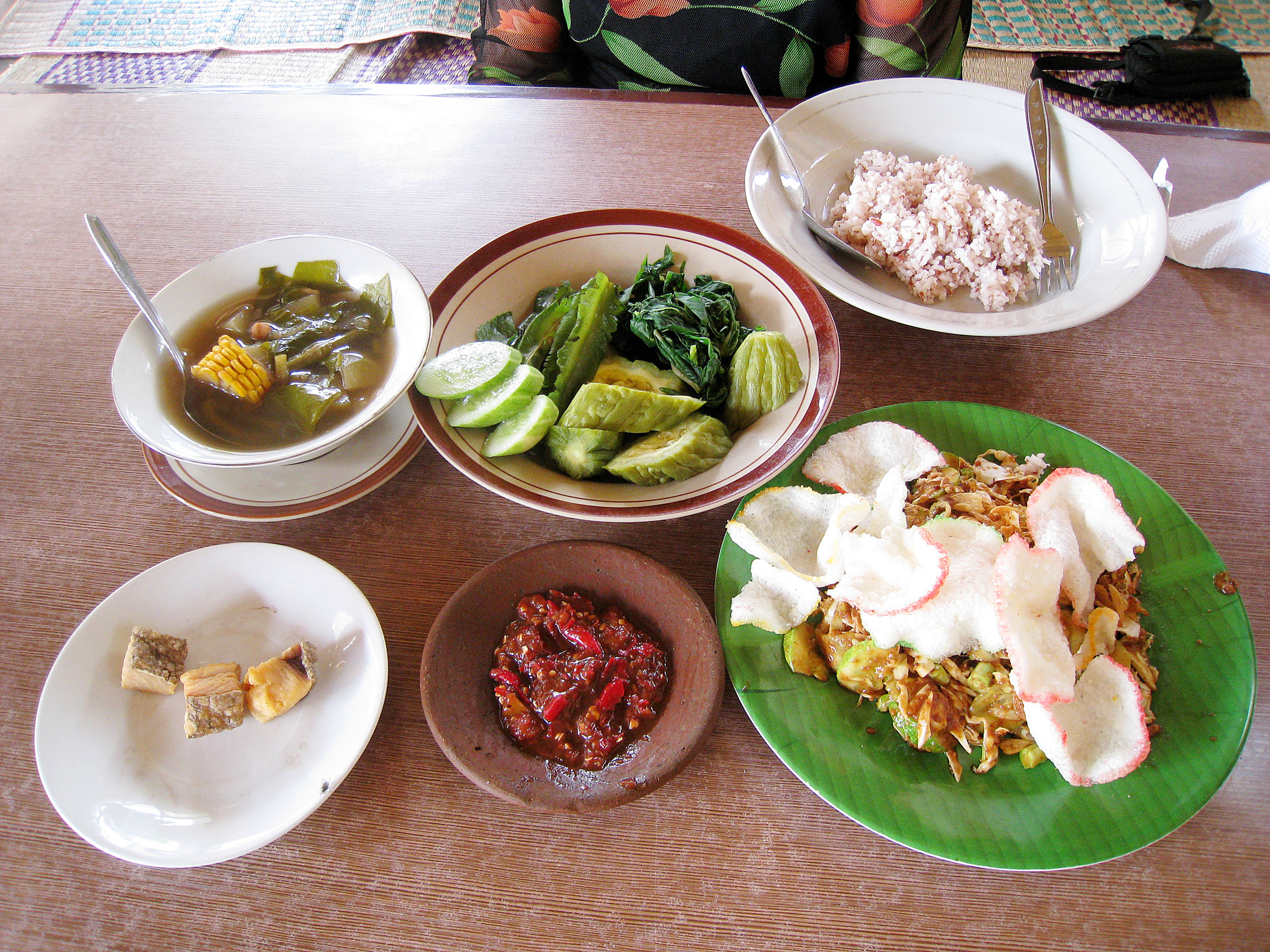
Examples of Sundanese cuisine, rich in fresh vegetables and adoring salted fish

A textural speciality of Sunda (West Java) is karedok, a fresh salad made with long beans, bean sprouts, and cucumber with a spicy peanut sauce. Lalab fresh vegetables served with spicy sambal dipping sauce is ubiquitous in Sundanese households and eating establishments. Other Sundanese dishes include mie kocok which is a beef and egg noodle soup, and soto bandung, a beef and vegetable soup with daikon and lemongrass. A hawker favourite is kupat tahu (pressed rice, bean sprouts, and tofu with soy and peanut sauce). Colenak (roasted fermented cassava tapai with sweet coconut sauce) and ulen (roasted brick of sticky rice with peanut sauce) are dishes usually eaten warm.

=== Central Java ===
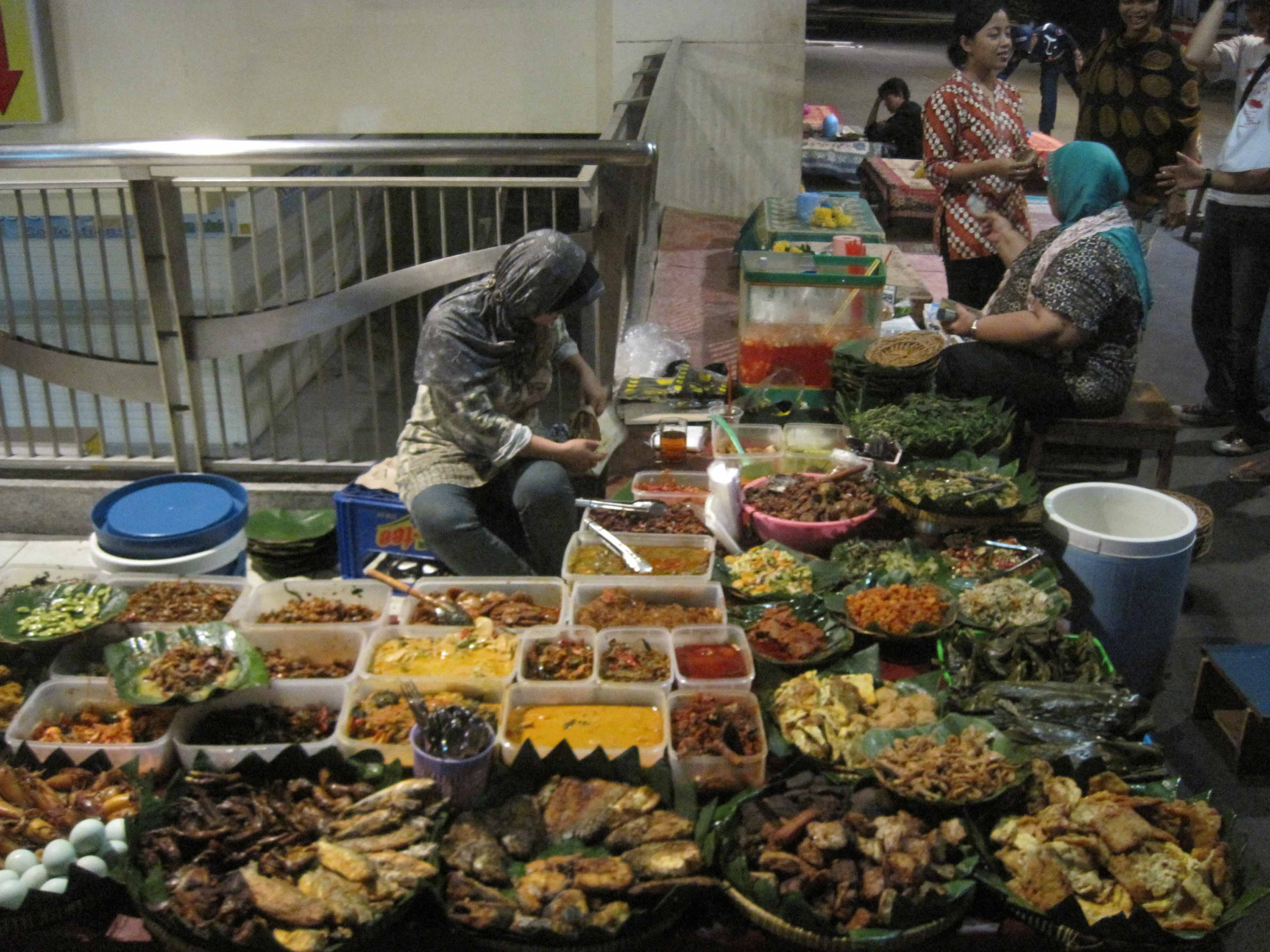
Various Javanese cuisine in lesehan (seat on the mat) style

The food of Central Java is renowned for its sweetness, and the dish of gudeg, a curry made from jackfruit, is particularly sweet. The city of Yogyakarta is renowned for its ayam goreng (fried chicken) and klepon (green rice-flour balls with palm sugar filling). Surakarta's (Solo) specialities include nasi liwet (rice with coconut milk, unripe papaya, garlic and shallots, served with chicken or egg) and serabi (coconut milk pancakes topped with chocolate, banana or jackfruit). Other Central Javanese specialities include pecel (peanut sauce with spinach and bean sprouts), lotek (peanut sauce with vegetable and pressed rice), and opor ayam (braised chicken in coconut sauce).

=== East Java ===
The food of East Java is similar to that of Central Java. East Java foods tend to be less sweet and more spicier compare to the Central Javanese ones. Fish and fish/seafood products are used quite extensively, e.g. terasi (dried shrimp paste) and petis udang (shrimp paste). Some of the more popular foods are lontong kupang (tiny clams soup with rice cakes), lontong balap (bean sprouts and tofu with rice cakes), sate klopo (coconut beef satay), semanggi surabaya (marsilea leaves with spicy sweet potato sauce), pecel lele (deep fried catfish served with rice and sambal), rawon (dark beef soup). Food from Malang includes bakso malang (meatball soup with won ton and noodles) and orem-orem (pressed rice, tempe, sprouts, soy sauce, coconut, and peanuts).

=== Madura ===
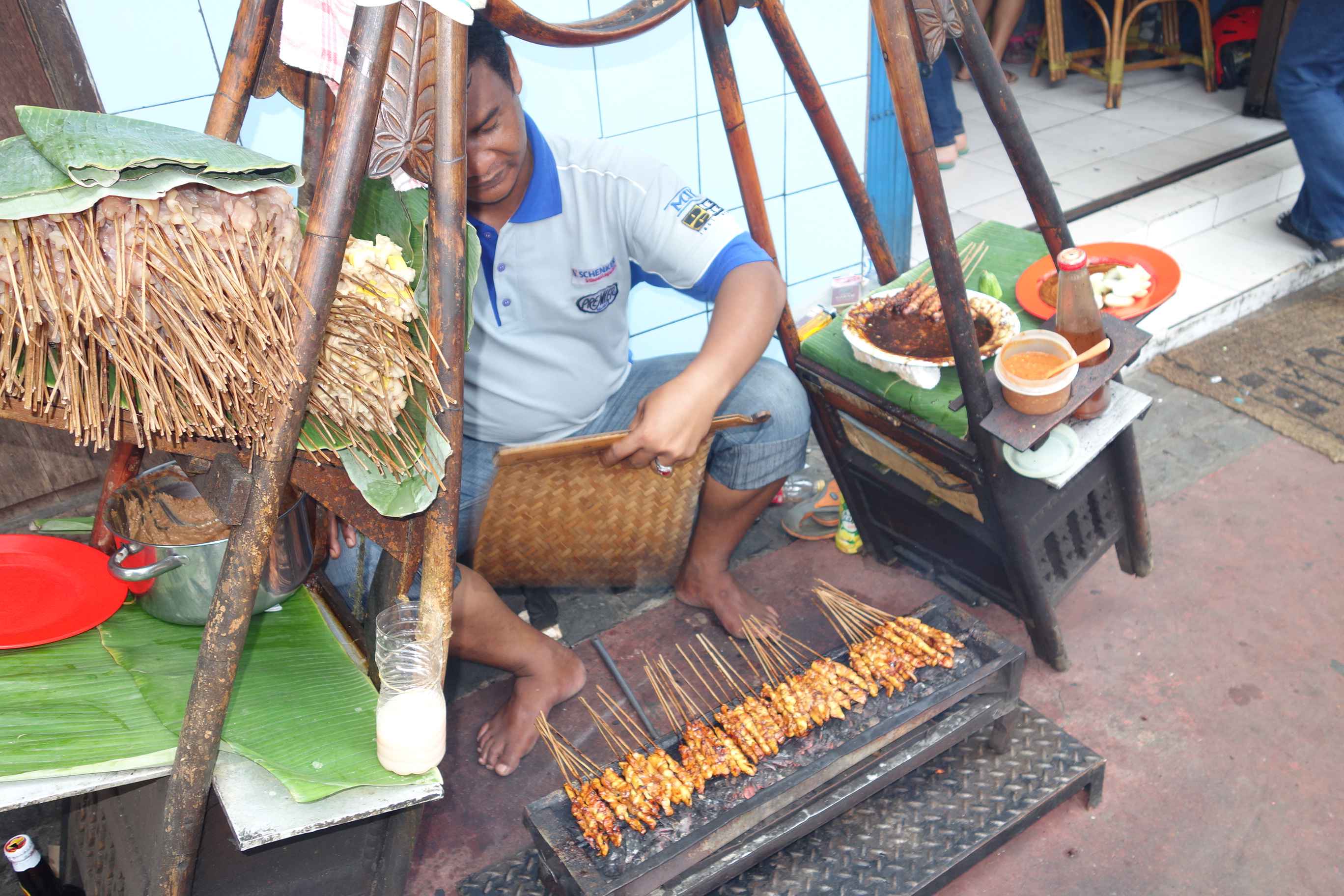
Grilling sate Madura

Madura is an island on the northeastern coast of Java and is administered as part of the East Java province. Like the Eastern Javanese foods which use petis udang, Madura foods add petis ikan which is made from fish instead of shrimp. The Madura style satay is probably the most popular satay variants in Indonesia. Some of its popular dishes are sate ayam Madura (chicken satay with peanut sauce), soto Madura (beef soup). There is also a mutton variant of Madura satay, Madura goat satay. Sup Kambing mutton soup is also popular in Madura. As a leading salt production center in Indonesian archipelago, Madura dishes are often saltier compared to other Eastern Javanese foods.

=== Bali ===
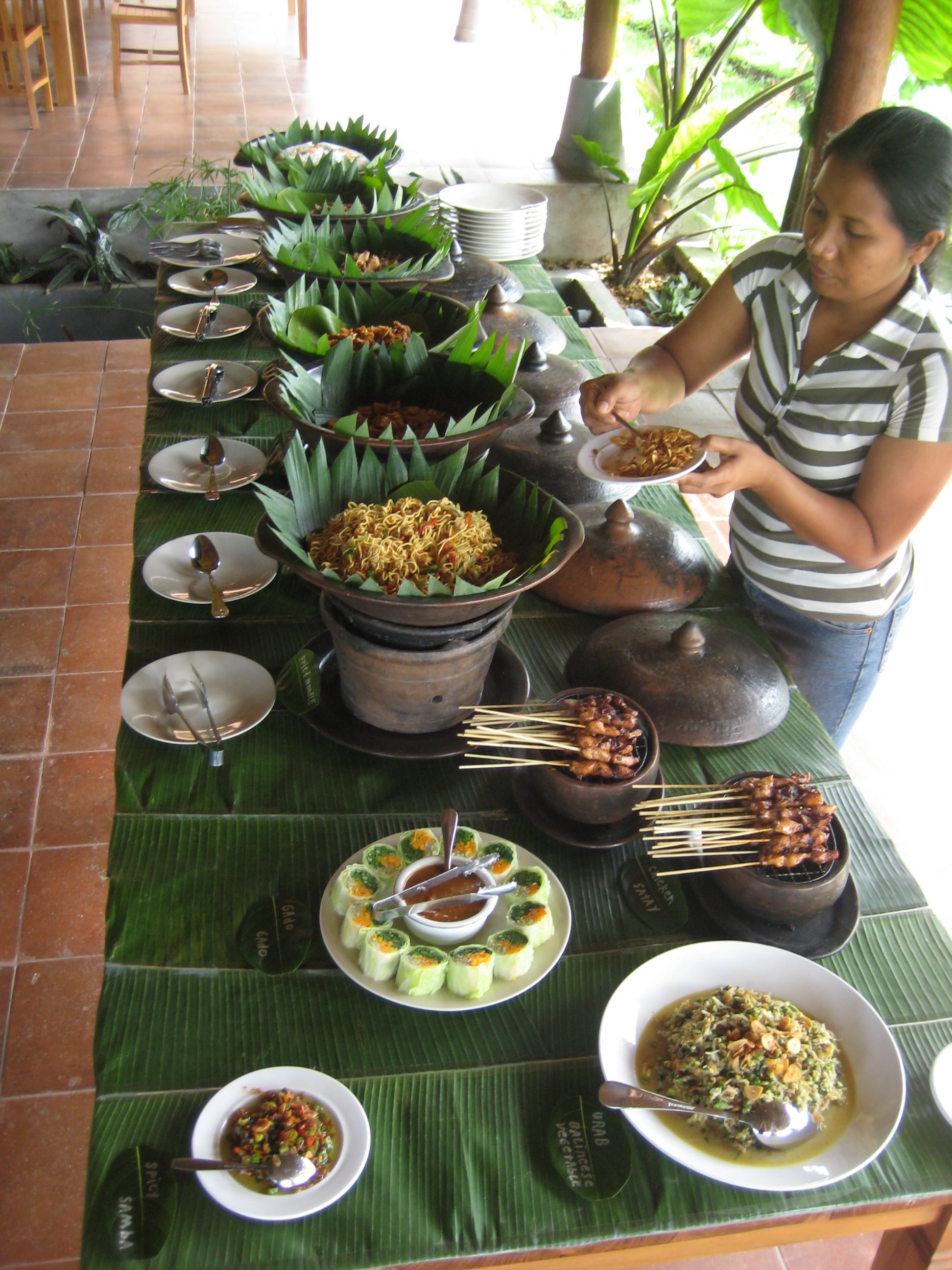
Nasi Bali in Balinese cuisine

Balinese cuisine dishes include lawar (chopped coconut, garlic, chilli, with pork or chicken meat and blood). Bebek betutu is duck stuffed with spices, wrapped in banana leaves and coconut husks cooked in a pit of embers. Balinese sate, known as sate lilit, is made from spiced mince pressed onto skewers which are often made from lemon grass sticks. Babi guling is a spit-roasted pig stuffed with chilli, turmeric, garlic, and ginger. Basa gede or basa rajang is a spice paste that is a basic ingredient in many Balinese dishes.

=== Batak ===
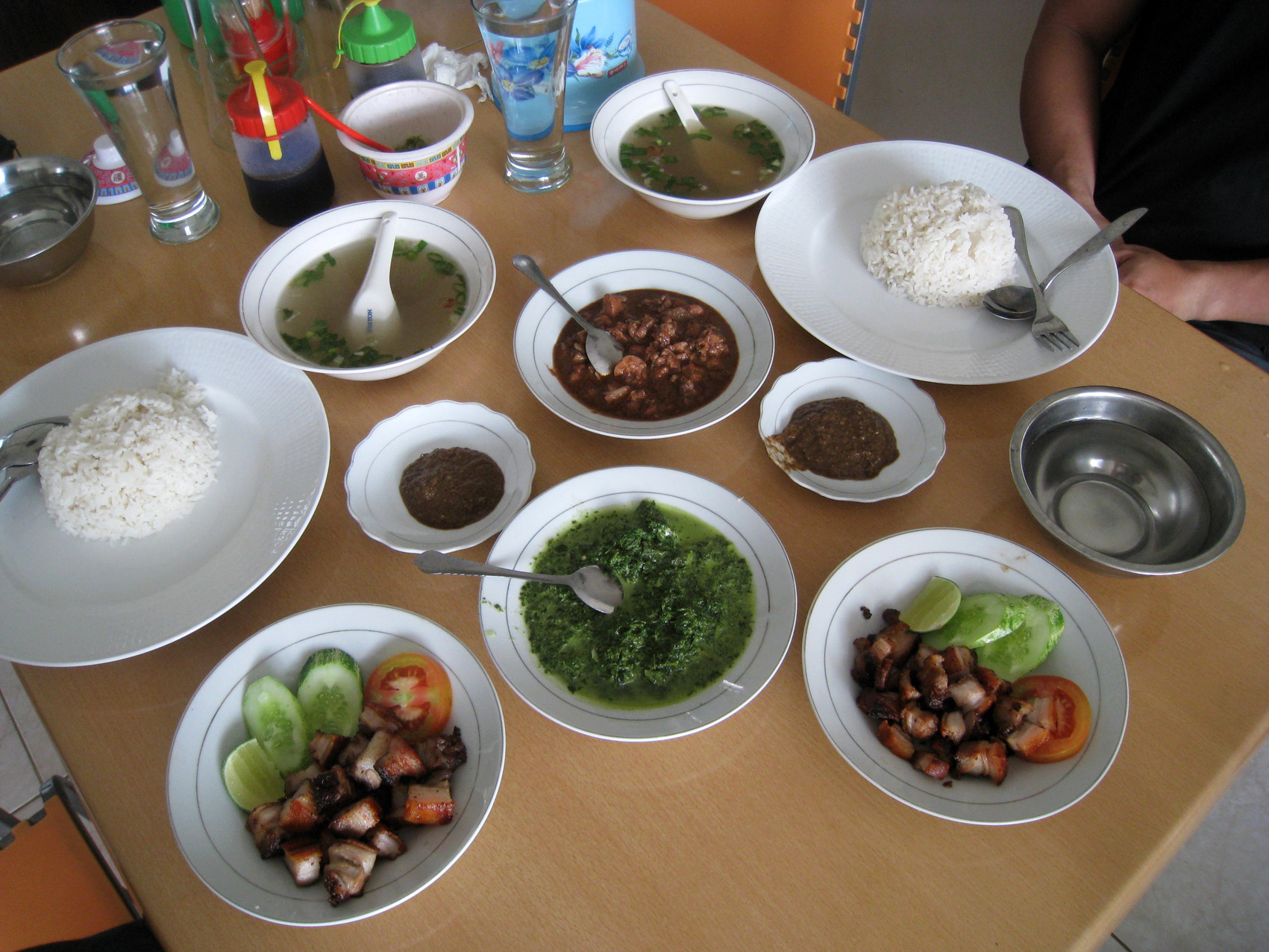
Batak dishes, saksang, babi panggang and daun ubi tumbuk

Batak people use either pork or even dog to make saksang. Another Batak pork speciality is babi panggang in which the meat is boiled in vinegar and pig blood before being roasted. Another batak dish, ayam namargota, is chicken cooked in spices and blood. Another notable Batak dish is arsik, the carp fish cooked with spices and herbs. Within Batak cuisine, andaliman (Zanthoxylum acanthopodium) is often used as a spice.

=== Aceh ===
Arab, Persian, and Indian traders influenced food in Aceh although flavours have changed a lot their original forms. Amongst these are curry dishes known as kare or gulai, which are rich, coconut-based dishes traditionally made with beef, goat, fish or poultry, but are now also made with tofu, vegetables, and jackfruit. The popular Aceh food such as roti cane, mie aceh and nasi gurih.

=== West Sumatra ===
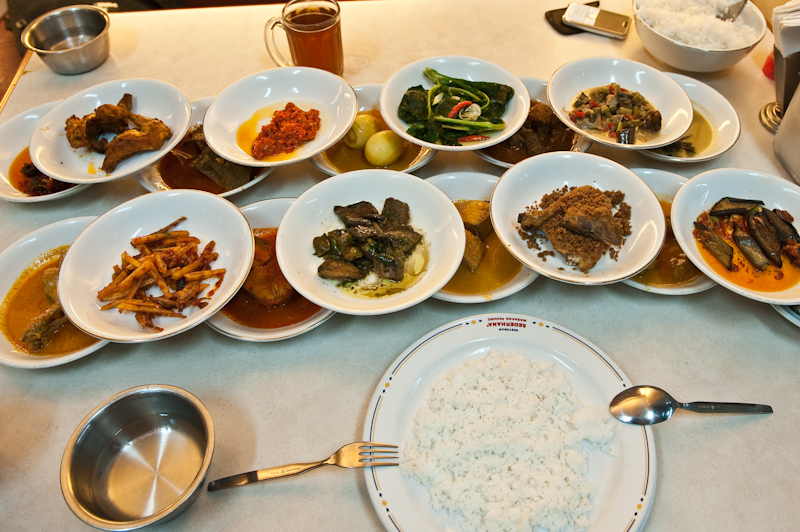
The hidang style Padang food served at Sederhana restaurant, all of the plates of food are laid out in front of customer, the customer only pays for whichever bowl they eat from.

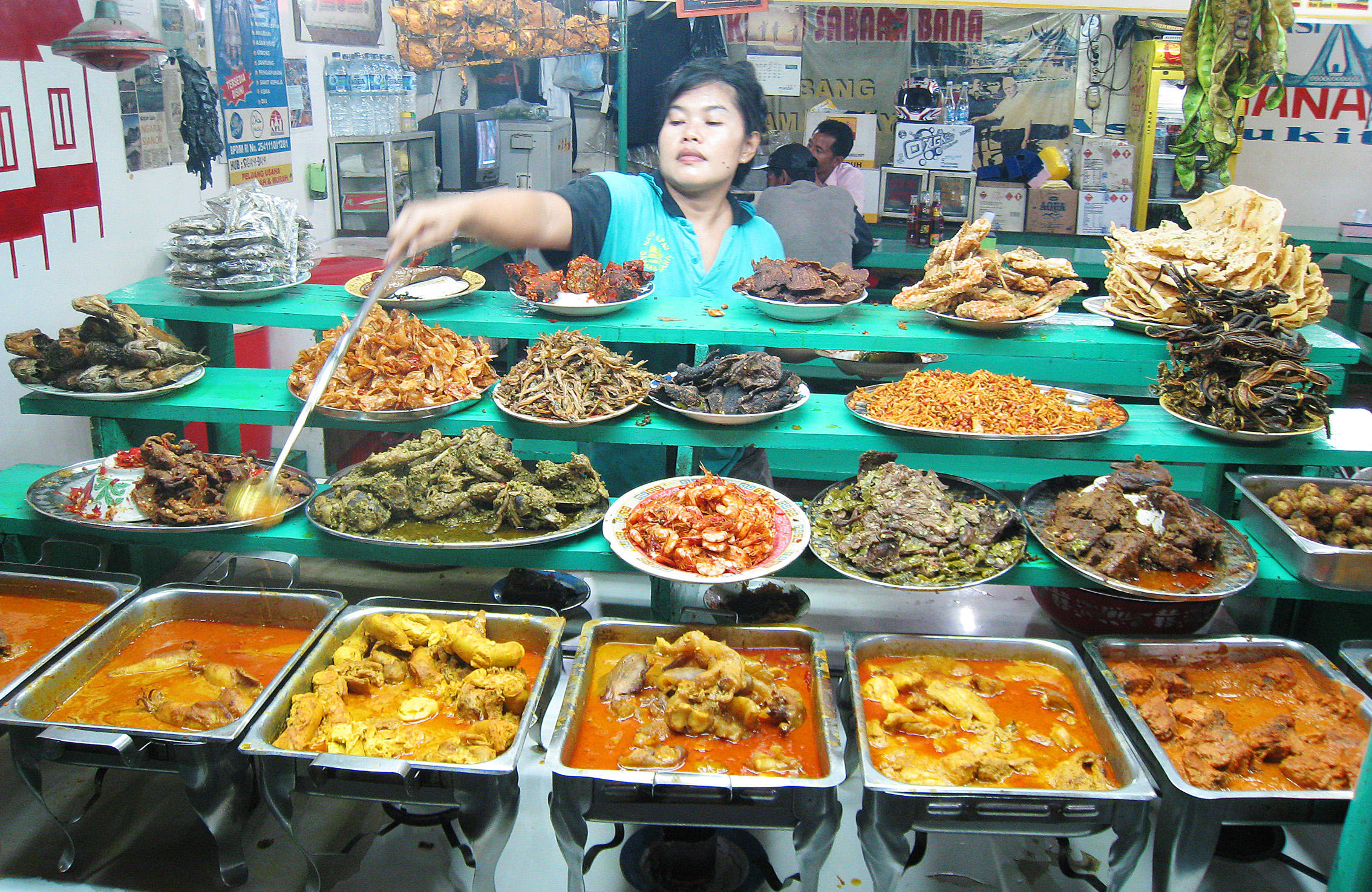
Array of Minangkabau dishes on display named Nasi Kapau or Nasi Padang or Masakan Padang

Buffaloes are a symbol of West Sumatra and are used in rendang, a rich and spicy buffalo meat or beef dish, which is also the signature dish of Minangkabau culture. In 2017, rendang was chosen as the "World's Most Delicious Food" by the CNN Travel reader's choice. Padang food comes from West Sumatra, and they have perhaps the richest variants of gulai, a type of curried meat, offal, fish or vegetables. Padang favourite includes asam padeh (sour and spicy fish stew), sate Padang (Padang satay), soto Padang (Padang soto) and katupek sayua (ketupat rice dumpling in vegetable soup). Dishes from the region include nasi kapau from Bukittinggi, which is similar to Padang food but uses more vegetables. Ampiang dadiah (buffalo yogurt with palm sugar syrup, coconut flesh and rice) and bubur kampiun (Mung bean porridge with banana and rice yogurt) are other West Sumatran specialties.

Traditionally, Minangkabau people adheres to merantau (migrating) culture, and they are avid restaurant entrepreneurs. As a result, Padang food restaurant chains can be found throughout Indonesia and neighbouring countries, likely making it the most popular regional dish in Indonesia. Outside of West Sumatra, such as in Java, most Padang Restaurants still use buffalo to make rendang, but claim it is Rendang Sapi for selling purposes, due to buffalo meat being "inferior" and cheaper than cow meat. Buffalo meat is harder, so it is more suitable for rendang which has a cooking time of at least 3 hours, and presents a coarser texture and a redder color compared to cow meat when it is fully cooked.

=== East Sumatra ===
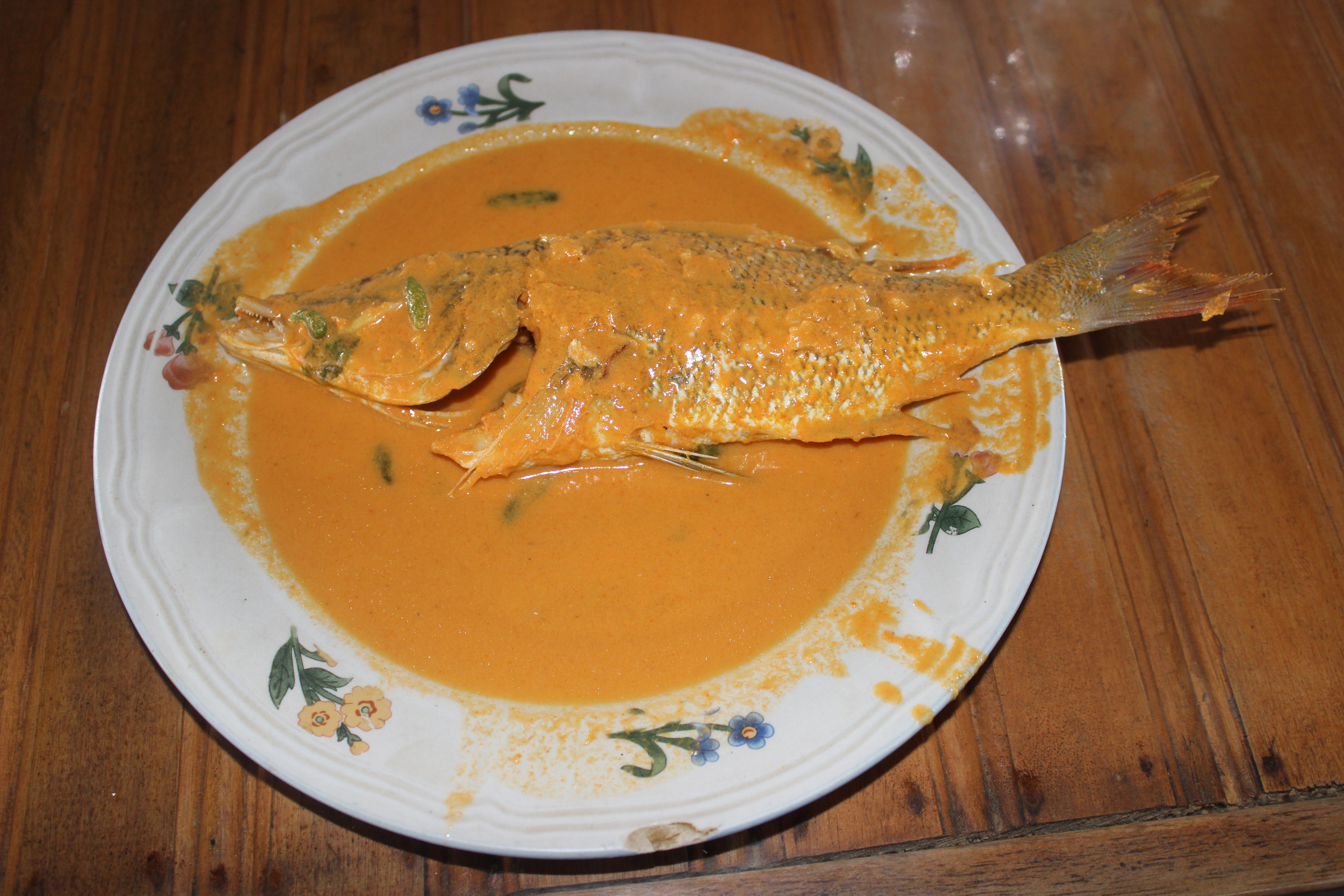
Gulai ikan kerapu, grouper curry

The cuisine of east coast of Sumatra is referring to the culinary tradition of ethnic Malays of Indonesian Sumatran provinces facing Malacca strait; which includes Riau, Riau Islands, Jambi provinces and coastal North Sumatra in Melayu Deli areas in and around Medan. Because of close ethnic kinship and proximity to Malaysian Malays, many dishes are shared between the two countries. For example nasi lemak, the national dish of Malaysia, and also nasi ulam are considered native dishes in Riau and Jambi. Malay cuisine also shares many similarities with neighboring Minangkabau cuisine of West Sumatra, South Sumatra, and also Aceh; such as sharing gulai, asam pedas, pindang, kari, lemang and rendang. This is due to the fact that the Minangkabau are culturally closely related to the Malays. Tempoyak fermented durian sauce and sambal belacan are the familiar condiments in both Sumatra and Malay Peninsula. Variants of peranakan cuisine such as laksa spicy noodle and otak-otak are also can be found in Riau Islands and Medan. Seafood dishes are popular in archipelagic Riau Islands province, while fresh water fishes from Sumatran rivers, such as patin, catfish, carp and gourami are popular in Riau and Jambi. Gulai ikan patin is a signature dish of Pekanbaru, while gulai ketam (crab gulai) and nasi goreng teri Medan (Medan anchovy fried rice) are the signature dishes of Medan.

=== South Sumatra ===
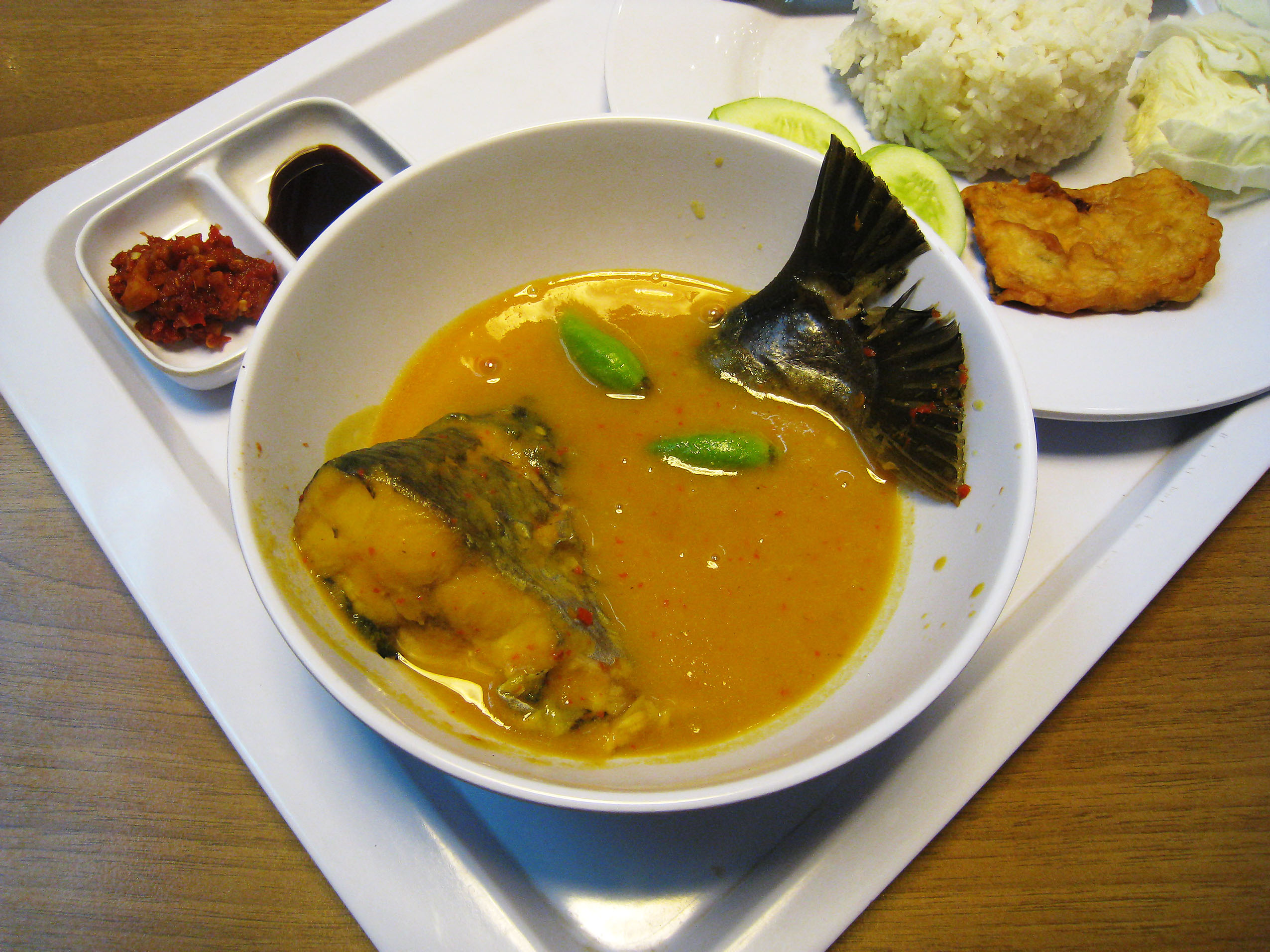
Tempoyak ikan patin a Palembang dish of pangasius fish in fermented durian sauce

The city of Palembang is the culinary centre of South Sumatra and is renowned for its pempek, a deep fried fish and sago dumpling that is also known as empek-empek. Pempek is served in distinctive kuah cuko, a sweet, sour and spicy sauce made from palm sugar, chili, tamarind and vinegar. Pempek derivatives dishes are tekwan soup of pempek dumpling, mushroom, vegetables, and shrimp, lenggang or pempek slices in omelette. Mie celor is a noodle dish with egg in coconut milk and dried shrimp, it is a Palembang speciality.

The cuisine of Palembang demonstrates various influences, from native Palembang Malay taste to Chinese and Javanese influences. Pempek is said to be influenced by Chinese fish cake akin to surimi, while the preference of mild sweetness is said to be of Javanese influence. South Sumatra is home to pindang, a sweet, sour and spicy fish soup made from soy sauce and tamarind. Pindang dishes usually uses either freshwater fishes and seafood as ingredients. Ikan brengkes is fish in a spicy durian-based sauce. Tempoyak is a sauce of shrimp paste, lime juice, chilli and fermented durian, and sambal buah is a chilli sauce made from fruit.

=== North Sulawesi ===
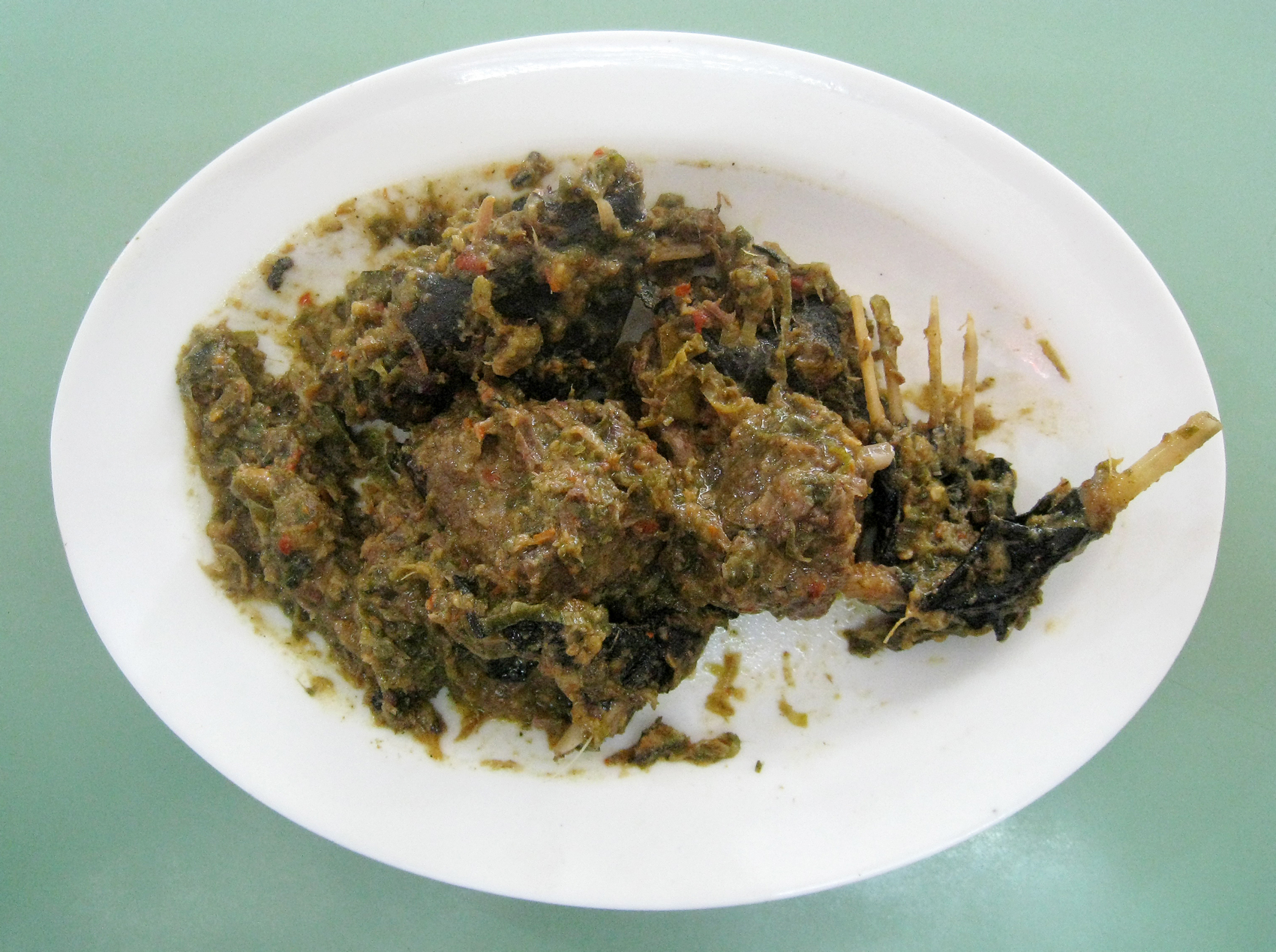
Paniki, fruit bat in spicy bumbu rica-rica green chili pepper

Manado cuisine of Minahasan people from North Sulawesi features the heavy use of meat such as pork, fowl, and seafood. Woku is a type of seafood dish with generous use of spices, often making up half the dish. The ingredients include lemongrass, lime leaves, chili peppers, spring onion, shallots, either sautéed with meat or wrapped around fish and grilled covered in banana leaves. Other ingredients such as turmeric and ginger are often added to create a version of woku. Other Minahasan signature dishes are tinutuan, chicken tuturuga, rica-rica and cakalang fufu.

Foreign colonial influence played a role in shaping Minahasan cuisine. Several cakes and pastries explicitly show Dutch, Portuguese and Spanish influences such as klappertaart and panada. Brenebon (from Dutch bruin (brown) and boon (bean)) is a pork shank bean stew spiced with nutmeg and clove. Minahasan roast pork similar to lechon in the Philippines or pig roast in Hawaii are served in special occasions, especially weddings. Other unusual and exotic meats such as dog, bat, and forest rat are regularly served in North Sulawesi region. Paniki is the bat dish of Minahasa.

=== Gorontalo ===
The strategic location of Gorontalo, between the Celebes Sea and Pacific Ocean in the north, and also Gulf of Tomini in the south, has made the Gorontalo region a historical shipping route. This long history formed the roots of culture in Gorontalo, including its unique dishes. In particular, Gorontalo is known for its use of spices.

Gorontalese cuisine known for its fresh seafood, prepared using a full-palette of spices and herbs. Home of some Gorontalese delicacies such as binte biluhuta, ayam iloni, ikan iloni, sate tuna, tabu moitomo, sate balanga, sagela, pilitode, and bilentango.

Gorontalo cuisine is also marked by a multi-cultural influence from other communities who migrated to Gorontalo, such as Arabs and Chinese culture. Moreover, Gorontalo's pastries are also famous for their sweetness and it has been influenced by European culture brought by the Dutch.

In 2016, the Gorontalese recipe book: "Trailing the Taste of Gorontalo" won as the "Best in the World" at the Gourmand World Cookbook Award in Yantai, China for the Asian Cuisine from Asian Books category.

=== South Sulawesi ===
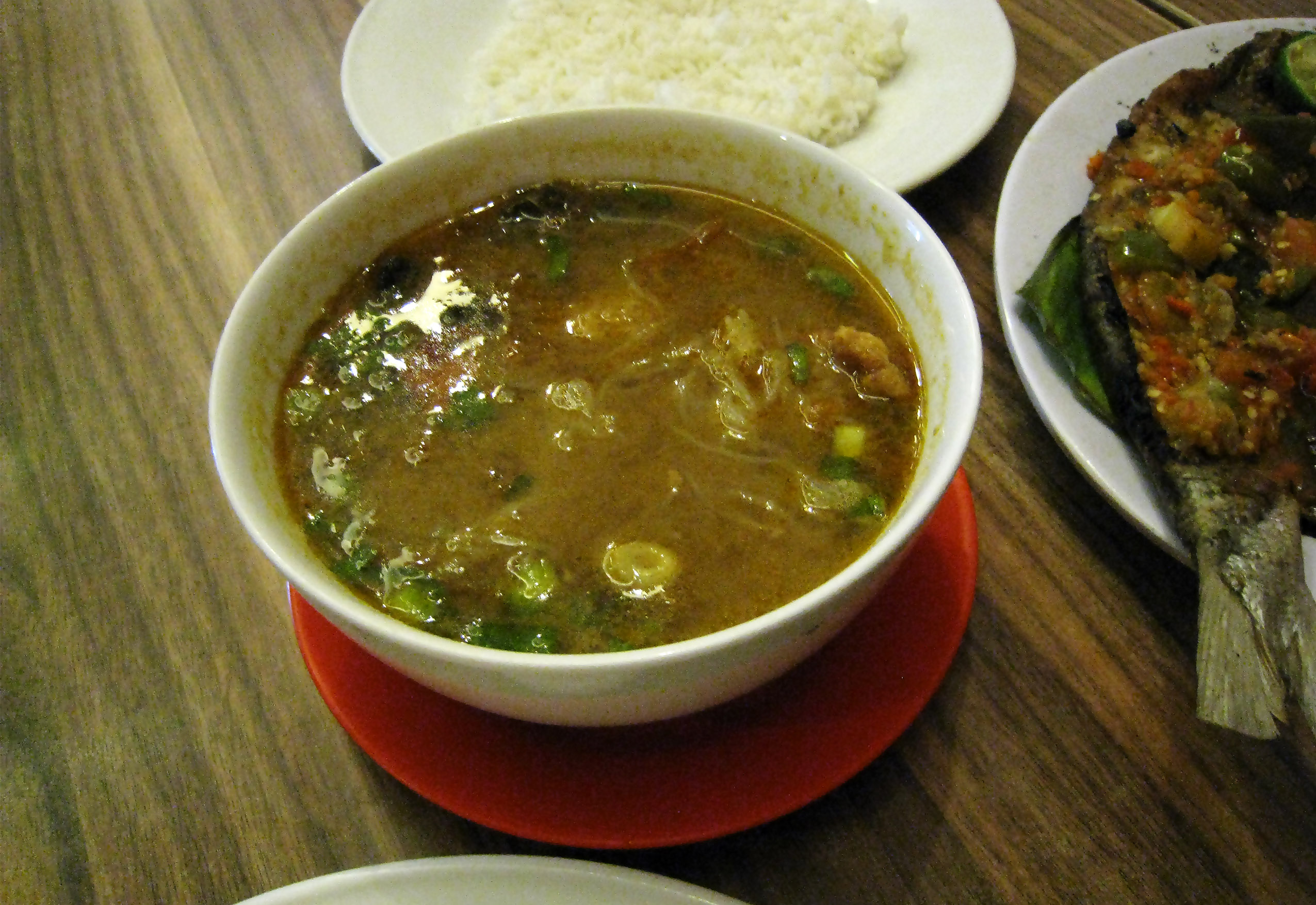
Sop saudara and ikan bolu bakar (grilled milkfish), specialty of Makassar

Makassar is one of the culinary centres in Indonesia. Home of some Bugis and Makassar delicacies such as Coto, Konro, Pallubasa and Mie Kering. All of these Makassar foods are usually consumed with burasa, a coconut milk rice dumpling wrapped in a banana leaf, to replace steamed rice or ketupat. As a big fish market centre, Makassar is also famous for its seafood. Various ikan bakar or grilled fish are popular and commonly served in Makassar restaurants, warung and foodstalls, such as ikan bolu bakar (grilled milkfish). Sop saudara from Pangkep and Kapurung from Palopo are also famous dishes of South Sulawesi. Another popular cuisine from Makassar is Ayam Goreng Sulawesi (Celebes fried chicken); the chicken is marinated in a traditional soy sauce for up to 24 hours before being fried into a golden colour. The dish is usually served with chicken broth, rice and special sambal (chilli sauce).

In addition, Makassar is also home of traditional sweet snacks such as pisang epe (pressed banana), as well as pisang ijo (green banana). Pisang Epe is a flat-grilled banana which is pressed, grilled, and covered with palm sugar sauce and sometimes eaten with durian. Many street vendors sell pisang epe, especially around the area of Losari beach. Pisang ijo is a banana covered with green colored flours, coconut milk, and syrup. Pisang ijo is sometimes served iced, and often sold and consumed as iftar to break the fast during Ramadhan.

=== Nusa Tenggara ===
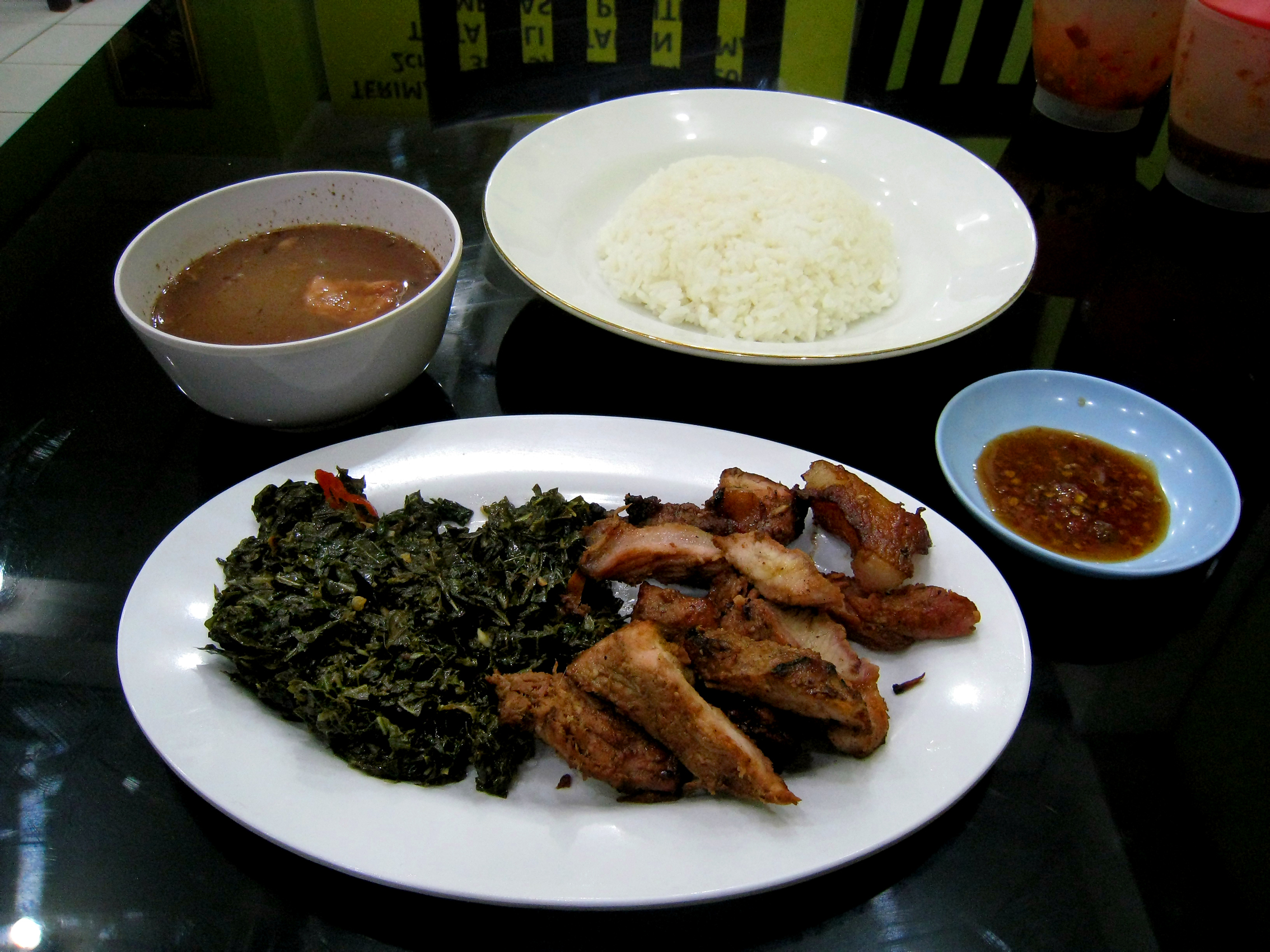
Se'i babi, smoked pork from Kupang, West Timor, East Nusa Tenggara

With a drier climate in Nusa Tenggara archipelago, there is less rice and more sago, corn, cassava, and taro compared to central and western Indonesia. Fishes are popularly consumed, including sepat (Trichogaster), which is shredded fish in coconut and young-mango sauce. Lombok's sasak people enjoy spicy food such as ayam taliwang which is roasted chicken served with peanut, tomato chilli and lime dip. Pelecing is a spicy sauce used in many dishes made with chilli, shrimp paste, and tomato. A local shrimp paste called lengkare is used on the island of Lombok. Sares is made from chilli, coconut juice and banana palm pith and is sometimes mixed with meat. Non meat dishes include kelor (hot soup with vegetables), serebuk (vegetables mixed with coconut), and timun urap (cucumber with coconut, onion and garlic).

In East Nusa Tenggara, majority of its inhabitants are Catholics, hence pork is commonly consumed. Popular Timor dishes are Se'i smoked meat (usually pork), and katemak vegetable soup.

The villages of Lamalera and Lamakera have a unique dietary in which they hunt and eat whales. Although they also catch dolphins and manta rays, they prefer to hunt whales as a whale can feed the whole village for weeks. Usually they hunt Sperm whale and Orca, while some whales such as the Baleen whale is considered to be taboo to hunt.

=== Maluku and Papua ===
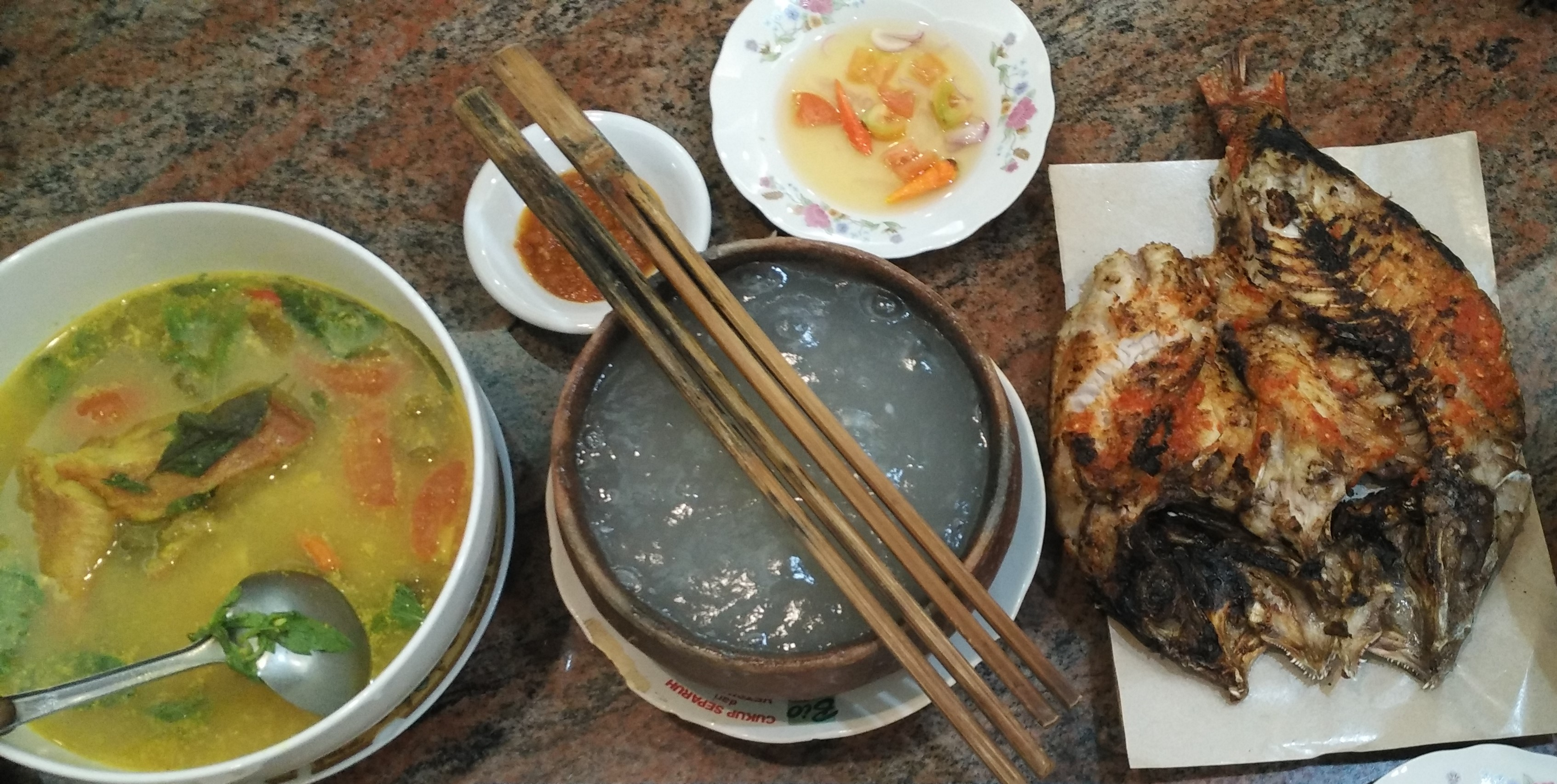
Maluku dishes, ikan kuah kuning (fish in a yellow soup), papeda, ikan bakar, and sambal colo-colo

The Maluku Islands' cuisine is rich with seafood, while the native Papuan food usually consists of roasted boar with tubers such as sweet potato and taro. Various types of ikan bakar (grilled fish) or seafood are eaten with spicy colo-colo condiment. The staple food of Maluku and Papua is sago, either as a pancake or sago congee called papeda, usually eaten with yellow soup made from tuna, red snapper or other fishes spiced with turmeric, lime, and other spices.

== Foreign influences ==
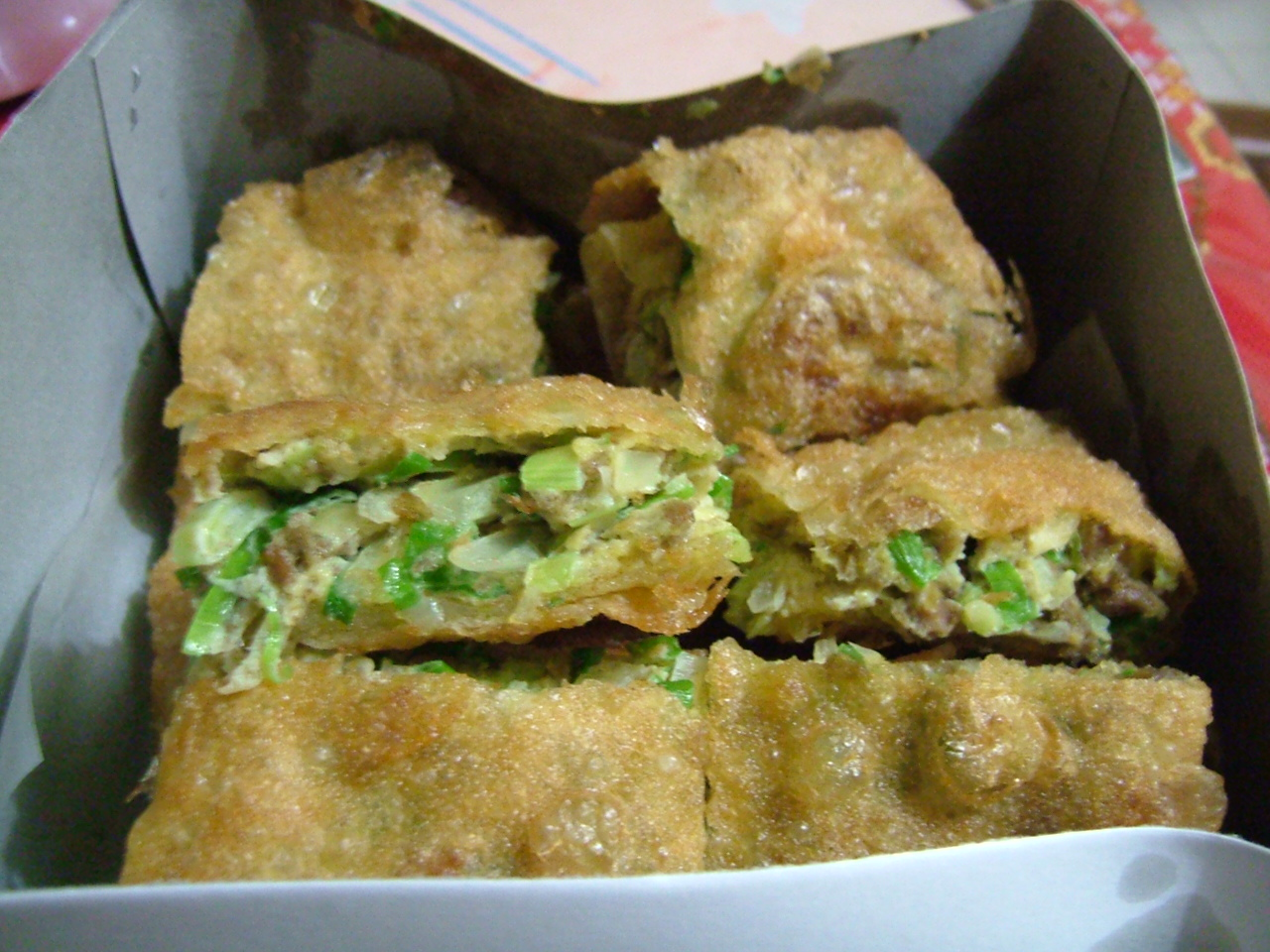
Martabak telur, a savoury egg, leek, and meat omelette

=== Indian influences ===
Indian influence can be observed in Indonesia as early as the 4th century. Following the spread of Islam to Indonesia, Muslim Indian as well as Arab influences made their way into Indonesian cuisine. Andreas Maryoto, a journalist which focus on culinary history, suggests there was at least two waves of Indian culinary influence that made its way into Indonesia. The early arrival was marked by the adoption of Hindu culture that still can be seen in Java. The second wave came from the Mughal Empire, which was influenced by Islamic culture that has entered the archipelago. This second wave of Indian culinary influence can be seen throughout most of northern Sumatra, especially in Aceh and West Sumatra provinces. Examples include Indian martabak and kari (curry) that influenced the cuisines of the Acehnese, Minangkabau and the Malays of Sumatra; in addition to Betawi and coastal Javanese cuisine. Some of Acehnese and Minangkabau dishes such as roti cane, nasi biryani, roti jala, mie aceh and gulai kambing can trace its origin to Indian influences.

=== Arab influences ===
Arab Indonesians brought their legacy of Arab cuisine—originally from Hadhramaut, Hejaz and Egypt—and modified some of the dishes with the addition of Indonesian ingredients. The Arabs arrived in the Nusantara archipelago to trade and spread Islam. Nasi kebuli for example, is a popular dish among Arab Indonesian community that has made its way into mainstream Indonesian cuisine. In Maluku, kue asida served during Ramadan for iftar, is believed to be derived from the Middle Eastern asida that was introduced by Arab merchants into the Maluku Islands.

=== Chinese influences ===
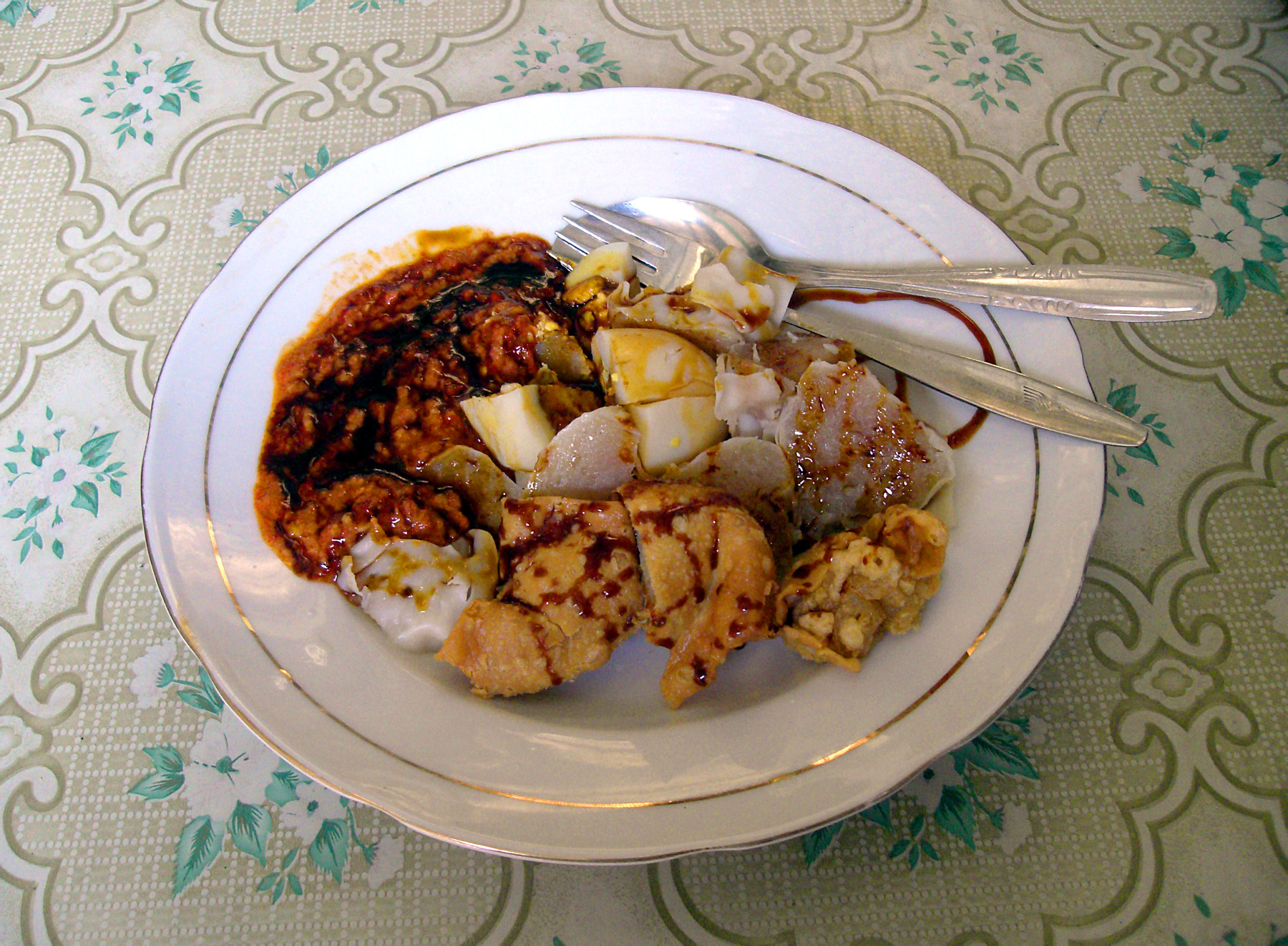
Siomay, a popular Indonesian Chinese-influenced dish

Chinese immigration to Indonesia started in the 7th century, and accelerated during Dutch colonial times, thus creating the fusion of Chinese cuisine with indigenous Indonesian style. Similar Chinese-native fusion cuisine phenomena is also observable in neighbouring Malaysia and Singapore as peranakan cuisine.

Most of the Chinese influence on Indonesian cuisine hails from the Hokkien style of cooking, with other influences coming from Hakka, Teochew and Cantonese style of cooking. Some of Chinese Indonesian food retain its Hokkien name; e.g. kwetiau, bakmi, bakcang, bihun and lumpia. Some popular Indonesian dishes trace its origin to Chinese influences such as; bakso, soto mie, soto, bakpau, nasi goreng, mie goreng, tahu goreng, siomay, pempek, nasi tim, cap cai, fu yung hai and swikee. Some of this Chinese-influenced dishes has been so well-integrated into Indonesian mainstream cuisine that many Indonesian today might not recognise their Chinese-origin and considered them their own.

=== European influences ===
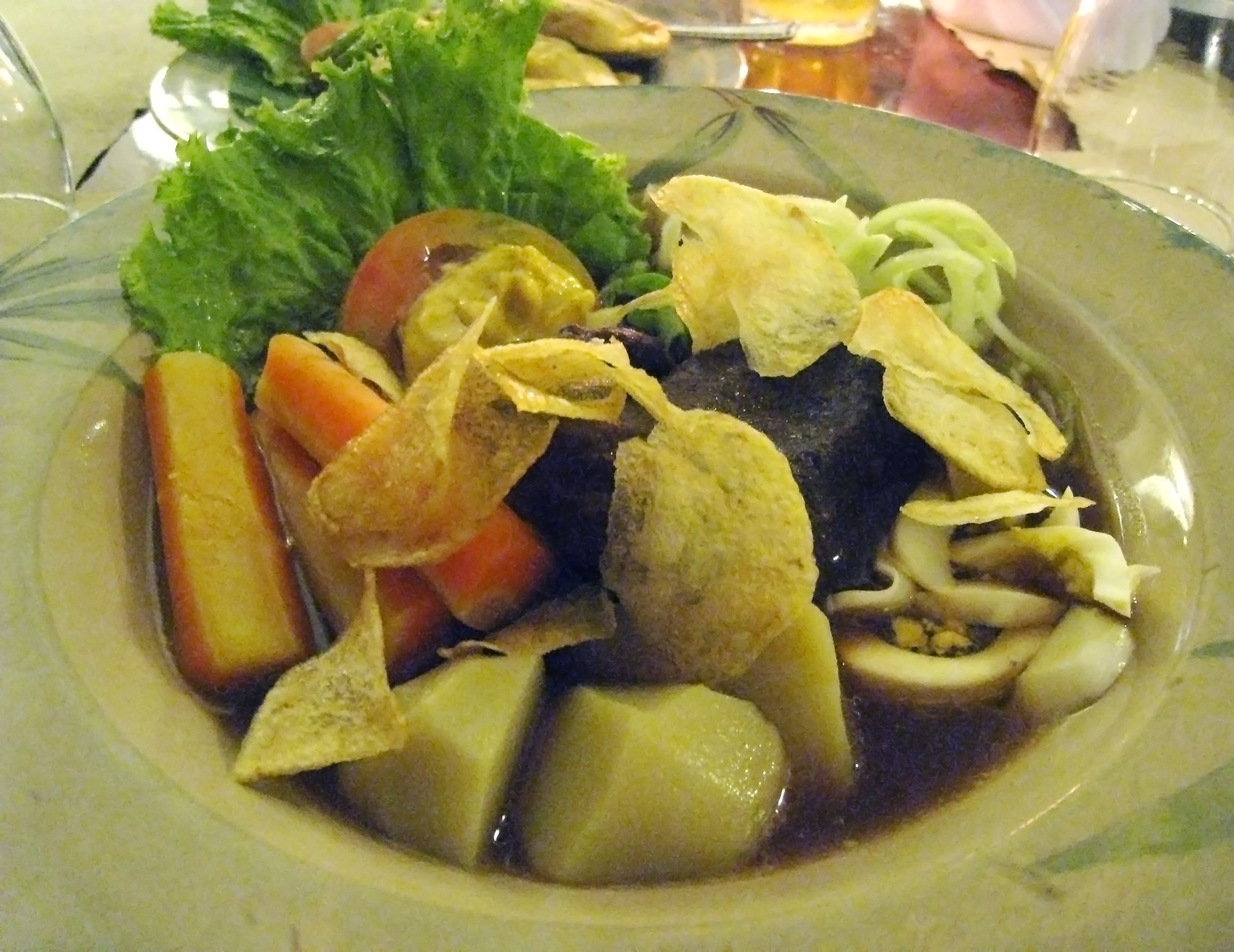
Selat solo (solo salad), an adaptation of European cuisine into Javanese taste

The Dutch and The Portuguese arrived in Indonesia in the 15th and the 16th century respectively in search of spices. The two colonial powers went for a century of struggle for the dominance over the archipelago, with the Dutch coming as victorious. When the Dutch East India Company (VOC) went bankrupt in 1800, Indonesia became a treasured colony of the Netherlands. Through colonialism, Europeans introduced bread, cheese, barbecued steak and pancake. Bread, butter and margarine, chocolate sprinkles, sandwiches filled with ham, cheese or fruit jam, poffertjes, pannenkoek and Dutch cheeses are commonly consumed by colonial Dutch and Indos during the colonial era. Some of native upperclass ningrat (nobles and economically well-off), and educated natives were exposed to European cuisine; This cuisine was held in high esteem as the cuisine of the upper class of Dutch East Indies society.

This led to adoption and fusion of European cuisine into Indonesian cuisine. Several Indonesian food can trace its origin from Dutch influence, such as kue odading that was derived from Dutch oliebollen, semur from Dutch smoor, perkedel from frikadeller, sop senerek from erwtensoep, selat solo (solo salad) from holland biefstuk.

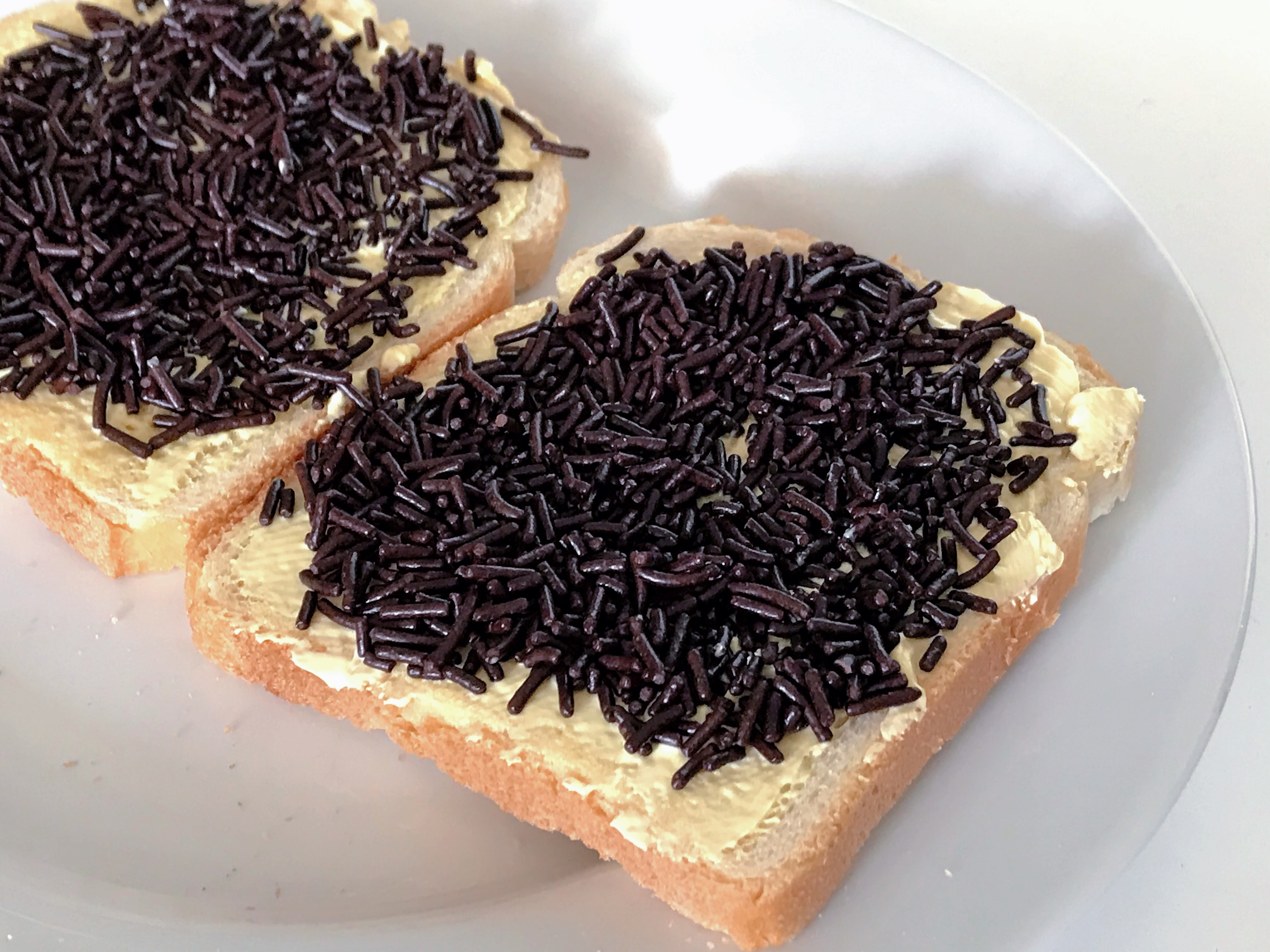
Meses on top of a buttered bread, is a particular staple for breakfast in Indonesia

Some dishes created during the colonial era were influenced by Dutch cuisine, including roti bakar (grilled bread), roti buaya, macaroni schotel (macaroni casserole), pastel tutup (Shepherd's pie), bistik jawa (Javanese beef steak), erten (pea soup), brenebon (kidney bean soup) and sop buntut.

Many pastries, cakes and cookies such as kue bolu (tart), lapis legit (spekkoek), lapis Surabaya (spiku), kroket (croquette), kue bolu kenari (ontbijtkoek), and kastengel (kaasstengels or cheese sticks) are come from Dutch influence. Some recipes were invented as Dutch Indies fusion cuisine, using native ingredients but employing European pastry techniques. These include pandan cake and klappertaart (coconut tart). Kue cubit, commonly sold as a snack at schools and marketplaces, are believed to be derived from poffertjes.

To a lesser extent, the Portuguese have also left their mark on Indonesian cuisine, in particular the Eastern part of the country's cooking, Panada for one, is believed to be an Indonesian interpretation of the Portuguese Empanadas, while Kue pastel is also another example of an interpretation of Portuguese pastry cooking by the Indonesians, Pastel de nata is also commonly present in the country, especially in the eastern parts of the country and among the Portuguese descendants in the city of Jakarta.

== Influence abroad ==
Conversely, Indonesian cuisine also had influenced the Dutch through their shared colonial heritage. Indonesian cuisine also influencing neighbouring countries through Indonesians migration across the straits to Malaysia and Singapore.

=== Malaysia ===
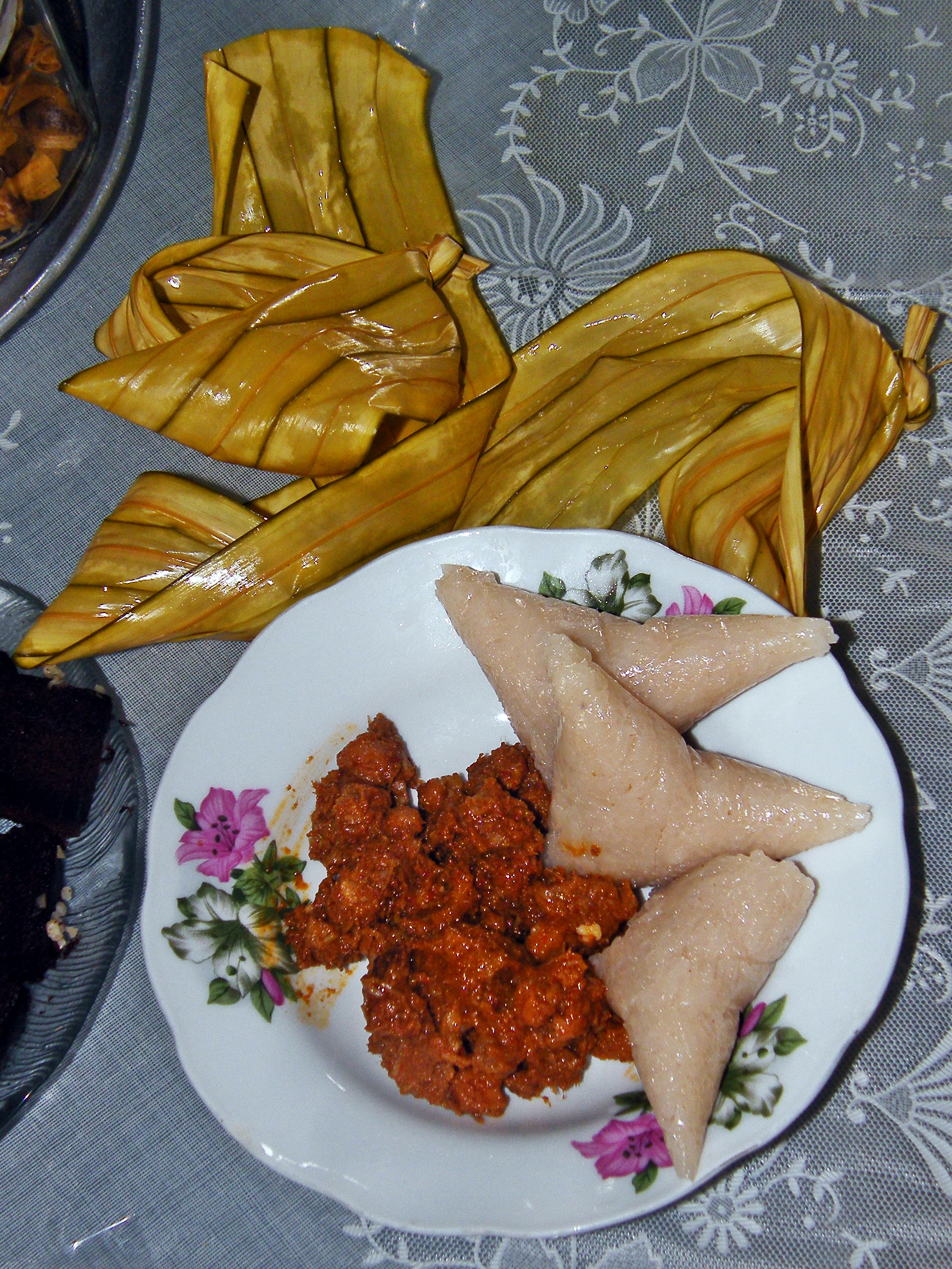
Beef rendang with ketupat palas also served in Malaysia

Because of their proximity, historic migrations and close cultural kinship, Indonesian cuisine also has influenced neighbouring cooking traditions; most notably Malaysian cuisine. Indonesian influence is pervasive in the central state of Negeri Sembilan, which was settled largely by Minangkabau people hailing from West Sumatra and is, thus, reflected in their culture, history and cuisine. Minangkabau cuisine influences is profound in Malay cooking tradition, as the result both traditions share same dishes; including rendang, gulai, asam pedas and tempoyak. Rendang is a typical example that has been well-integrated into mainstream Malaysian cuisine and is now considered their own, and popular especially during Hari Raya Aidil Fitri. In the early 20th century, there are large influx of Sumatrans to Kuala Lumpur and other parts of Malaysia heartland, that led to the popularity of Nasi Padang (originated from Padang city, West Sumatra) not only in Malaysia, but also in Singapore.

The Malay cuisine of southernmost state of Johor, reflects the influences of Javanese who settled there for over past two centuries. Popular Javanese-origin dishes in Johor includes ayam penyet, nasi ambeng, telur pindang, sayur lodeh, mee rebus and pechal.

=== Singapore ===
Some dishes in Singapore are influenced by Indonesian cuisine. Satay bee hoon has a connection to Javanese cuisine. The dish was a product of Teochew Chinese and Javanese culinary cultures. Singaporean rojak has its roots in Indonesia. In cakes and pastries, Indonesian traditional kue snacks and dessert also has influenced Singapore's kueh scene, through the migration of Anastasia Liew, a Chinese Indonesian entrepreneur, into the city state and established Bengawan Solo cake shop that has become a Singaporean signature.

=== Thailand ===
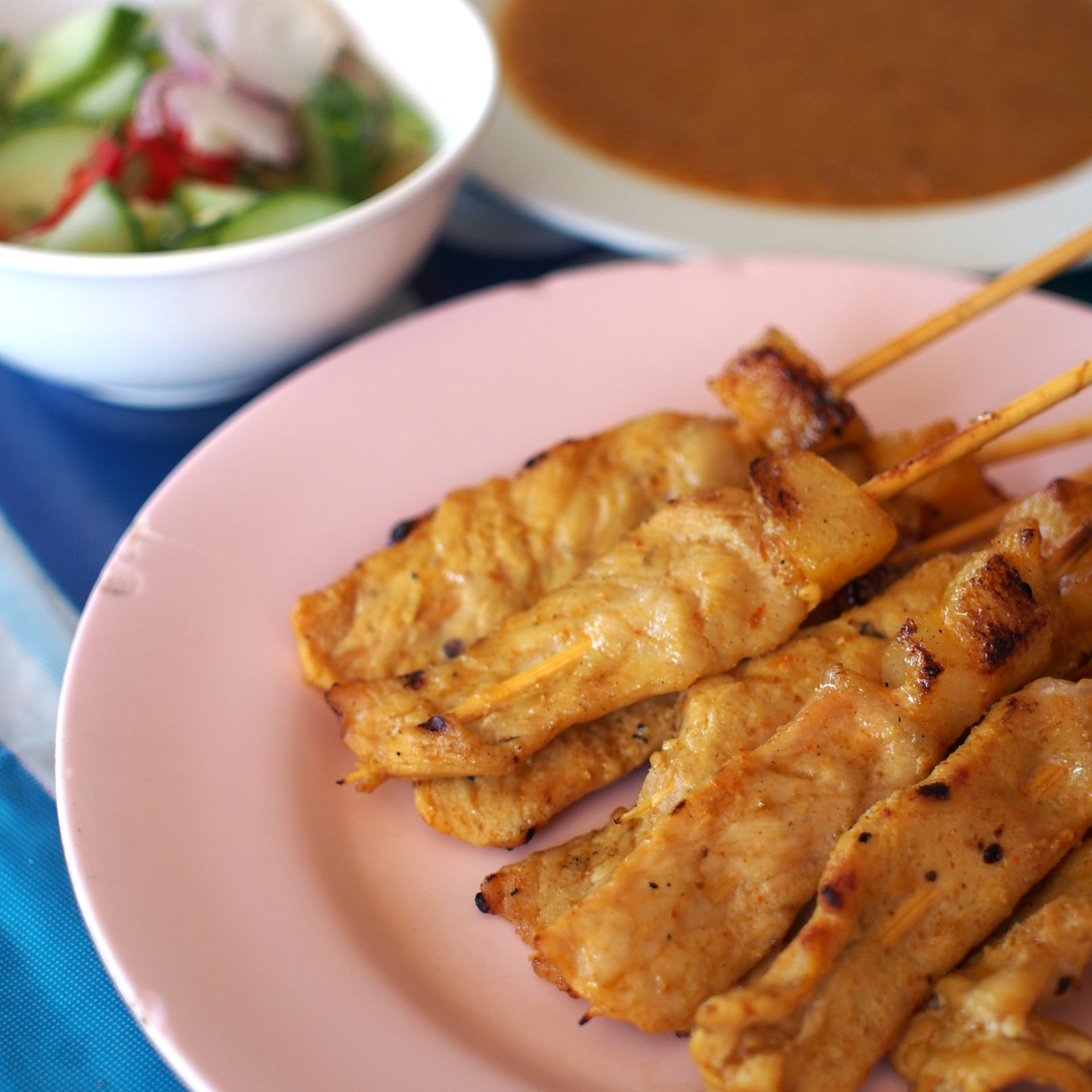
Thai pork satay

To a lesser extent, Indonesian cuisine also had influenced Thai cuisine — probably through Malaysian intermediary — such as the introduction of satay, from Java to Sumatra, Malay Peninsula, and reached Thailand. Achat (Thai: อาจาด pronounced [ʔāː.t͡ɕàːt]), is a Thai pickle which is believed to be derived from Indonesian acar. It is made with cucumber, red chilies, red onions or shallots, vinegar, sugar and salt. It is served as a side dish with the Thai version of satay (Thai: สะเต๊ะ).

=== Philippines ===
Some Filipino dishes, especially the ones came from the Muslim South have shown some influence from Indonesian cuisine, the Filipino Satti is believed to have been influenced to some extent by the Indonesian Sate, Indonesian Rendang is also popular among the Muslim Mindanaoans and is believed to have been introduced there by Minang merchants, Tarambulan share a similar pronunciation with the Indonesian Terang Bulan.

=== Netherlands ===
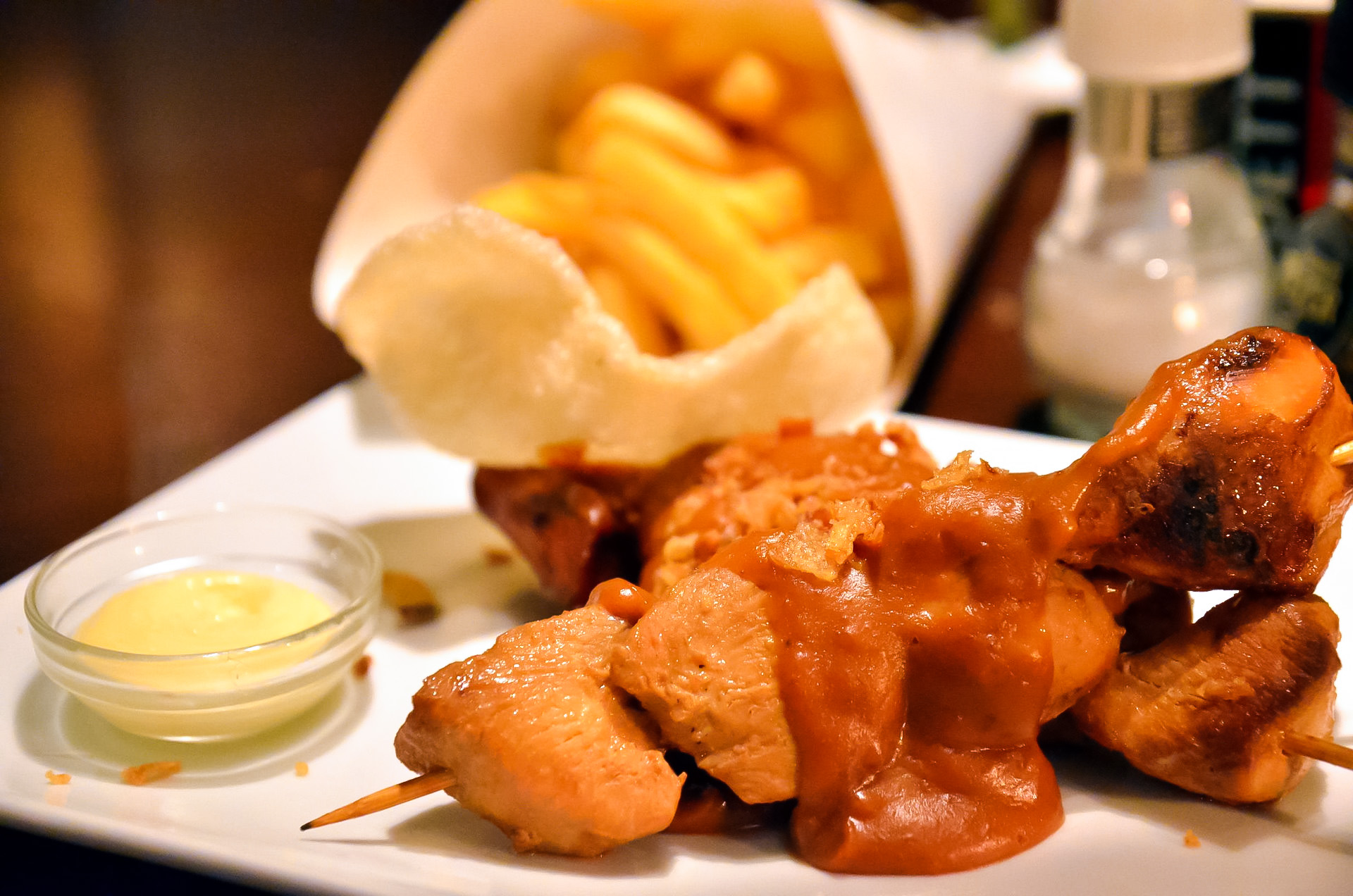
Kipsate met friet, Dutch take on Indonesian chicken satay, served with Peanut sauce, fried onions, kroepoek, friet, and mayonnaise

During the colonial period, the Dutch embraced Indonesian cuisine both at home and abroad. The Indonesian cuisine had influenced colonial Dutch and Indo people that brought Indonesian dishes back to the Netherlands due to repatriation following the independence of Indonesia.

C. Countess van Limburg Stirum writes in her book "The Art of Dutch Cooking" (1962): There exist countless Indonesian dishes, some of which take hours to prepare; but a few easy ones have become so popular that they can be regarded as "national dishes". She then provides recipes for nasi goreng (fried rice), pisang goreng (battered, deep fried bananas), lumpia goreng (fried spring rolls), bami (fried noodles), satay (grilled skewered meat), satay sauce (peanut sauce), and sambal oelek (chilli paste).

Dutch-Indonesian fusion dishes also exist, of which the most well-known is the rijsttafel ("rice table"), which is an elaborate meal consisting of many (up to several dozens) small dishes (hence filling "an entire table"). While popular in the Netherlands, Rijsttafel is now rare in Indonesia itself. Today, there are many Indonesian restaurants in the Netherlands, especially in large cities like Amsterdam, The Hague, Utrecht and Rotterdam.

=== Culinary diplomacy ===
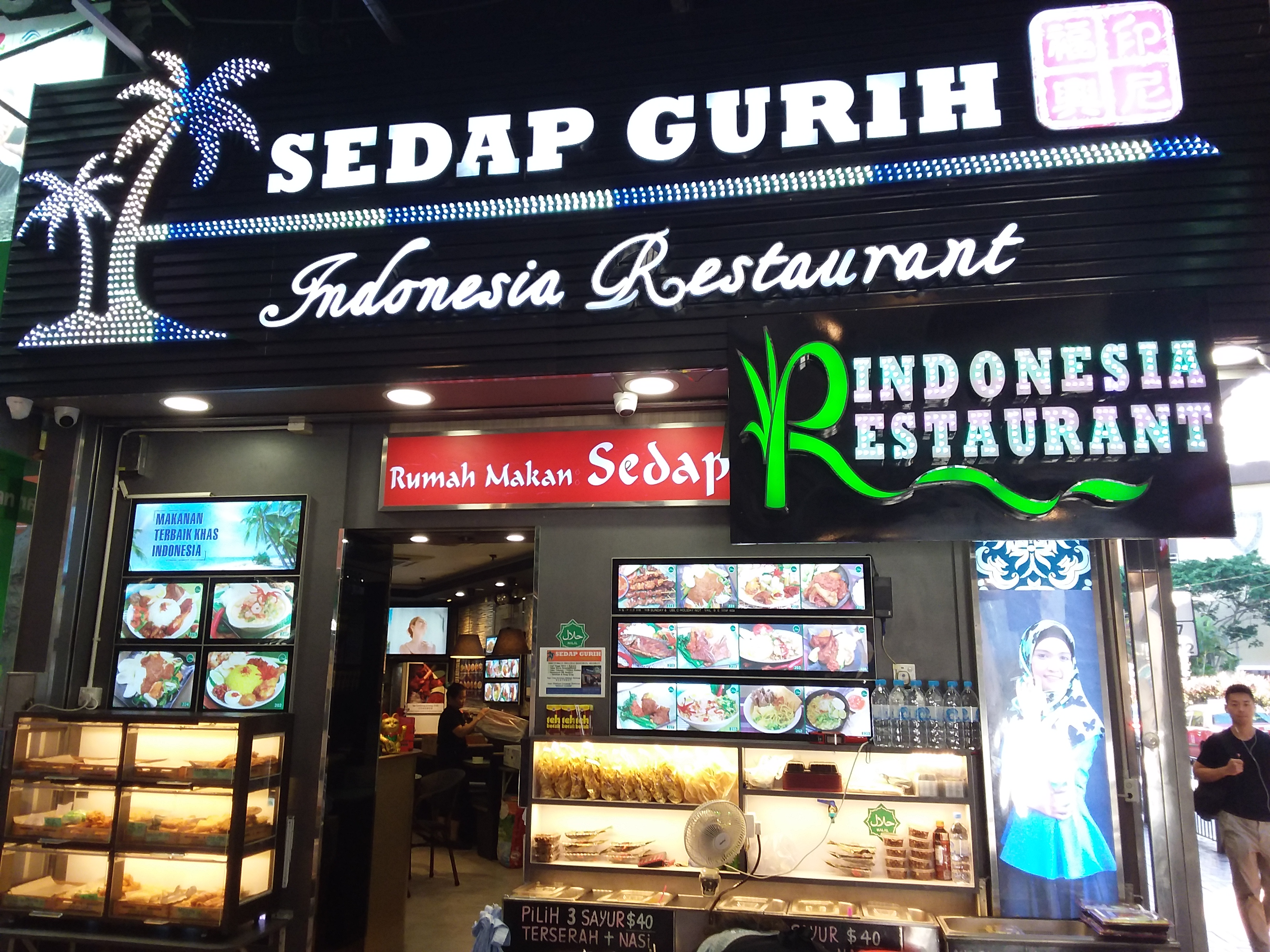
Indonesian restaurant in Hong Kong

Indonesian cuisine traditionally enjoyed popularity in neighbouring countries; e.g. Malaysia, Singapore, Brunei and Australia, as well as nations that shares historical ties with Indonesia; such as the Netherlands, Suriname, East Timor and South Africa. It is also increasingly popular in Japan and Korea, as well as in Western Europe through Dutch intermediary.

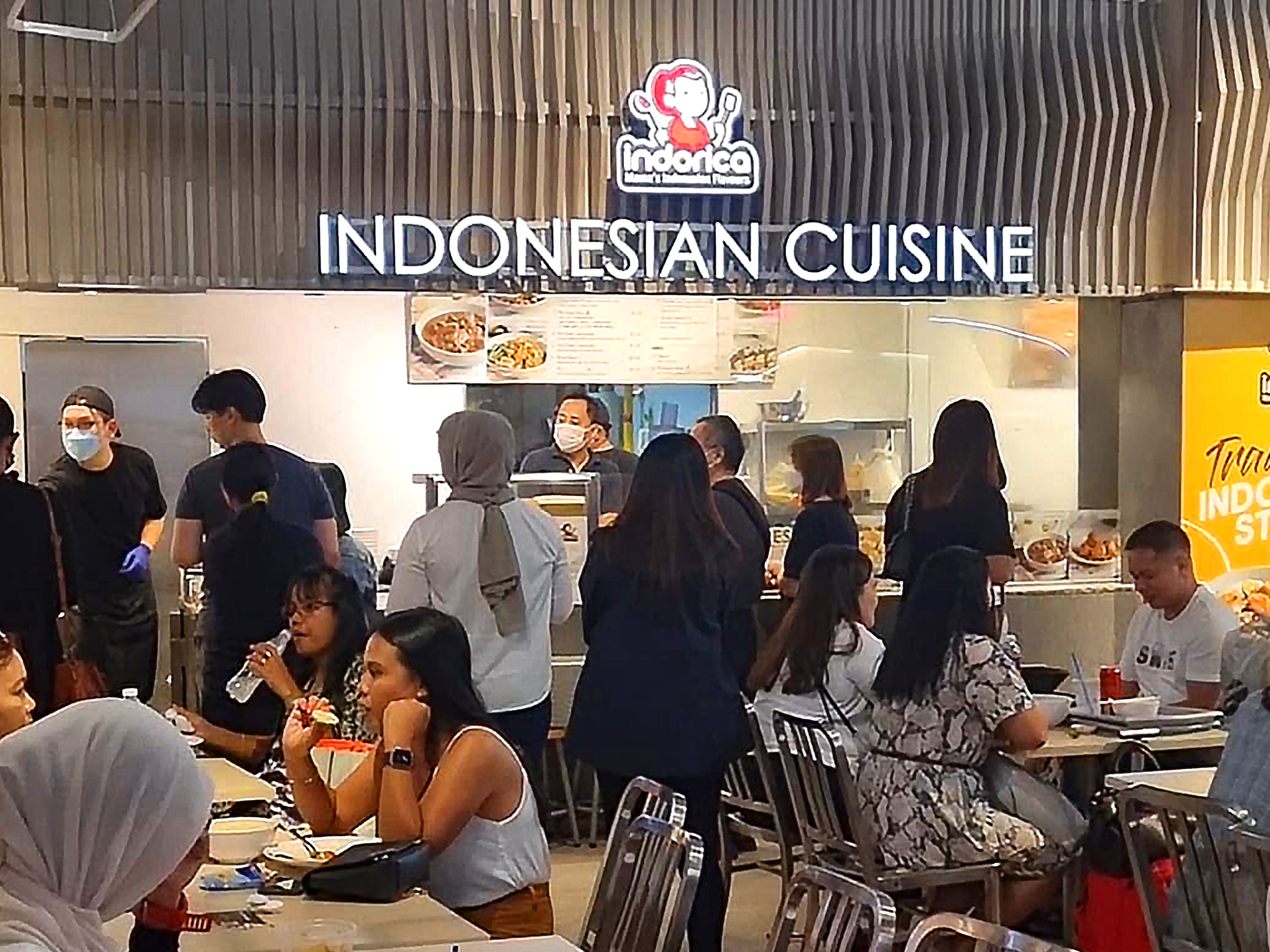
indorica, popular Indonesian Street Food Stall in Singapore Foodcourt scene

Learning from the success of other countries culinary diplomacy, especially those of Thailand, Korea and Japan, in 2021, the Indonesian government has launched the "Indonesia Spice Up The World" program, which is a form of coordinated gastrodiplomacy efforts. The programme was launched to promote Indonesian cuisine abroad, to assist Indonesian culinary industry; by helping the local spice products and processed food to find their ways into the global market, and also to assist Indonesian restaurants abroad.

The "Indonesia Spice Up The World" program involves government's inter-ministerial institutions, Indonesian food industry, and also the public. The objective of the program is to boost the export value of Indonesian spices and herbs to US$2 billion, and increasing the presence of four thousand Indonesian restaurants abroad by 2024.

== Meal times ==
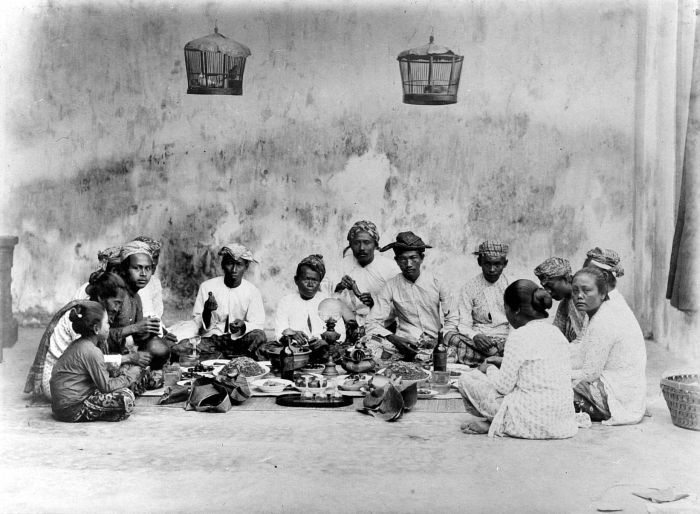
Traditional slametan meal in Java during colonial period

Indonesians might consume snacks or varieties of small dishes throughout the day. If separate scheduled larger meal is observed, they usually consists of sarapan or makan pagi (breakfast), makan siang (lunch) is often the main meal of the day, followed by makan malam (dinner). Mealtime is typically a casual and solitary affair, and might be observed differently across region.

In western and central Indonesia, the main meal is usually cooked in the late morning, and consumed around midday. In many families there is no set meal time when all members are expected to attend. For this reason, most of the dishes are made so that they can remain edible even if left on the table at room temperature for many hours. The same dishes are then re-heated for the final meal in the evening. Most meals are built around a cone-shaped pile of long-grain, highly polished rice. A meal may include a soup, salad (or more commonly vegetables sautéed with garlic), and another main dish. Whatever the meal, it is accompanied by at least one, and often several, relishes called sambals. Especially for Javanese family, on the table, it is also common to always have chips, that can be kerupuk, rempeyek, or any other chips to accompany the meal.

In eastern Indonesia, such as on the islands of Papua and Timor, where the climate is often much drier, the meals can be centred around other sources of carbohydrates such as sago or root vegetables and starchy tubers. Being east of the Wallace line, the biogeographic realm, and hence the flora and fauna, are quite different from those of the islands to the west, and so the food stuffs are as well.

== Feasts ==
=== Tumpeng ===
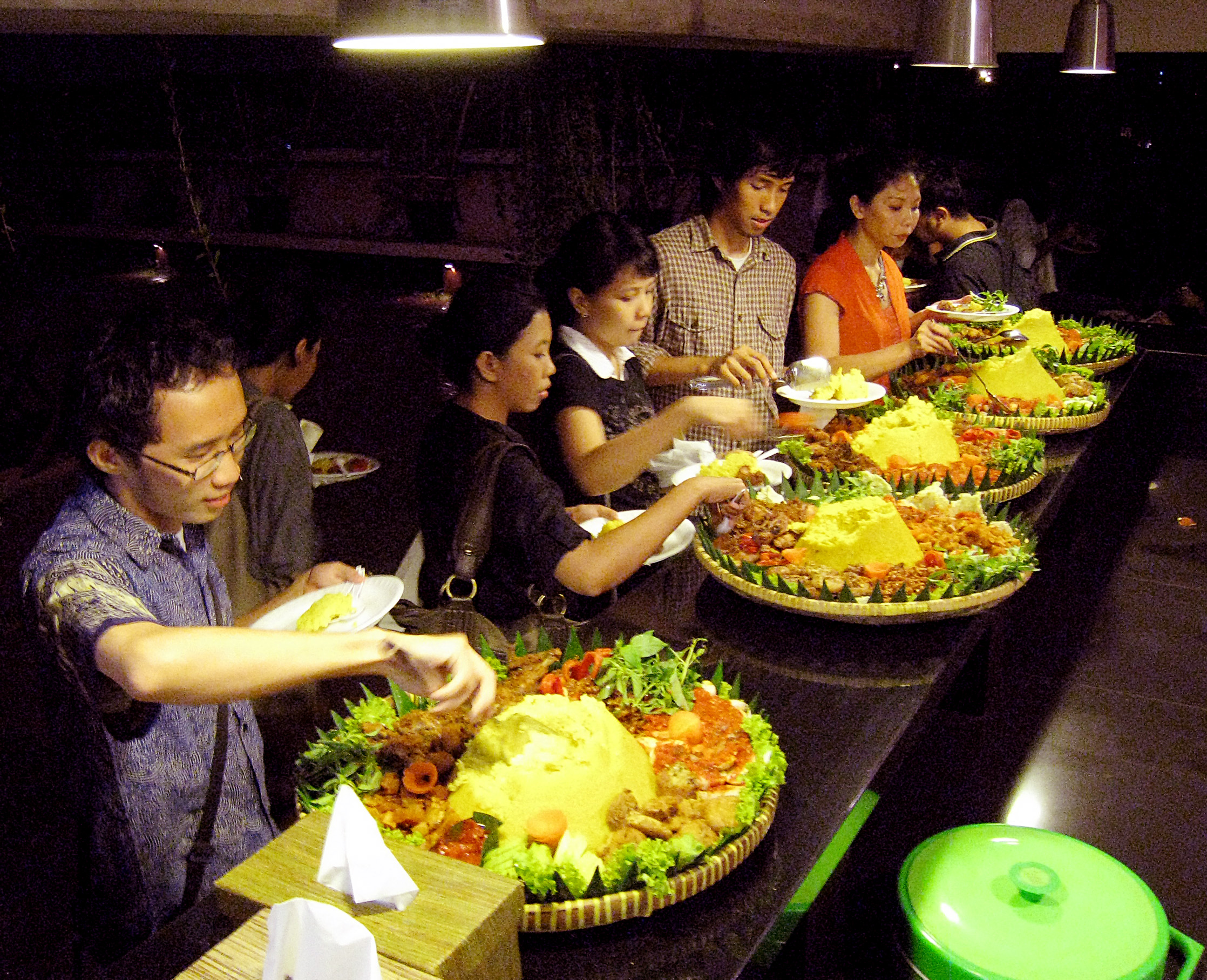
Tumpeng nasi kuning, the cone shaped yellow rice is served during a feast.

Many Indonesian traditional customs and ceremonies incorporate food and feast, one of the best examples is tumpeng. Originally from Java, tumpeng is a cone shaped mound of rice surrounded by an assortment of other dishes, officially chosen as Indonesian national dish in 2014. Traditionally featured in slametan ceremonies, the cone of rice is made by using bamboo leaves woven into a cone-shaped container. The rice itself can be plain white steamed rice, uduk (rice cooked with coconut milk), or yellow rice (rice coloured with kunyit, i.e., turmeric). After it is shaped, the rice cone is surrounded by assorted dishes, such as urap vegetables, fried chicken, semur (beef in sweet soy sauce), teri kacang (little dried fish fried with peanuts), fried prawns, telur pindang (marbleized boiled eggs), shredded omelette, tempe orek (sweet, dry fried tempeh), perkedel kentang (mashed potato fritters), perkedel jagung (corn fritters), sambal goreng ati (liver in chilli sauce), and many other dishes. Nasi tumpeng probably comes from an ancient Indonesian tradition that revers mountains as the abode of the ancestors and the gods. Rice cone is meant to symbolise the holy mountain. The feast served as some kind of thanksgiving for the abundance of harvest or any other blessings. Because of its festivities and celebratory value, even now tumpeng is sometimes used as an Indonesian counterpart to birthday cake.

=== Nasi Padang ===
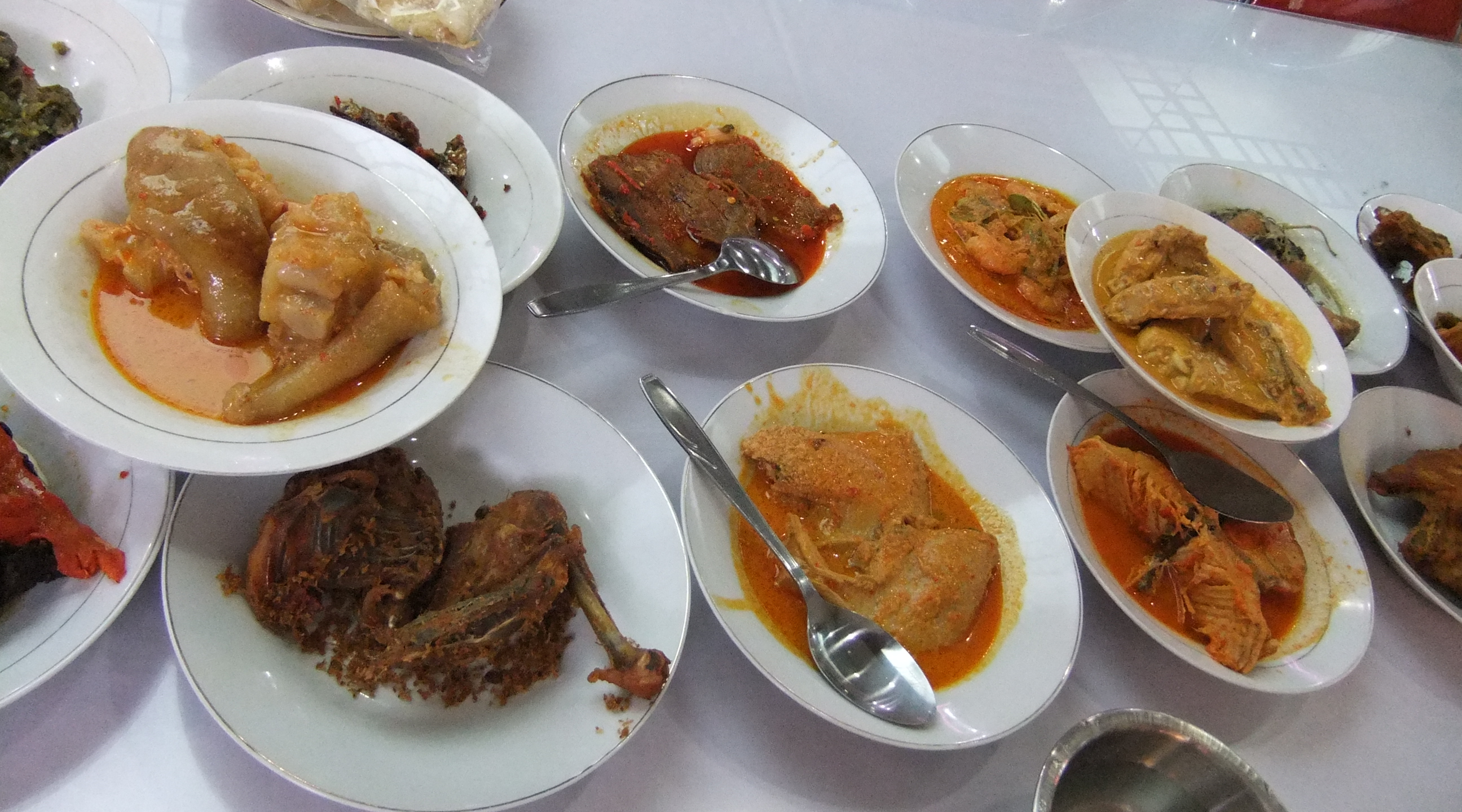
Hidang presentation of nasi padang

Having Nasi Padang in festive hidang (serve) style provides opportunity to sample wide array of Padang food in a single setting. Nasi Padang (Padang-style rice) is the steamed rice served with various choices of pre-cooked dishes originated from Padang city, West Sumatra. It is a miniature banquet of meats, fish, vegetables, and spicy sambals eaten with plain white rice. It is the Minangkabau's great contribution to Indonesian cuisine.

After the customers are seated, they do not have to order. The waiter with stacked plates upon their hands will immediately serves the dishes directly to the table. The table will quickly be set with dozens of small dishes filled with richly flavoured foods such as beef rendang, various gulais, curried fish, stewed greens, chili eggplant, curried beef liver, tripe, intestines, or foot tendons, fried beef lung, fried chicken, and of course, sambal. A dozen of dishes is a normal number, it could reach 14 dishes or more. Nasi Padang is an at-your-table, by-the-plate buffet. Customers take — and pay for — only what they have consumed from this array.

=== Rijsttafel ===
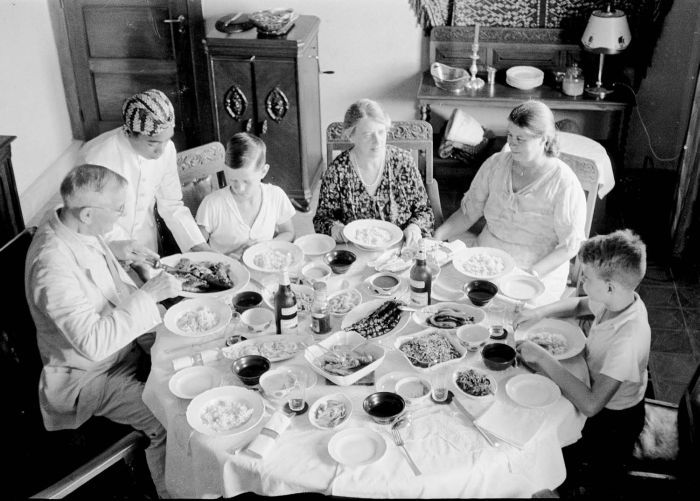
Rijsttafel in 1936 Dutch East Indies

Another Indonesian feast, the Rijsttafel (from Dutch, meaning 'rice table'), demonstrates both colonial opulence and the diversity of Indonesian cuisine at the same time. The classic style rijsttafel involved serving of up to 40 different dishes by 40 male waiters, bare foot but dressed in formal white uniforms with blangkon (traditional Javanese caps) on their heads and batik cloth around their waists. In contemporary Indonesian cuisine, it has been adapted into a western style prasmanan buffet.

=== Prasmanan ===
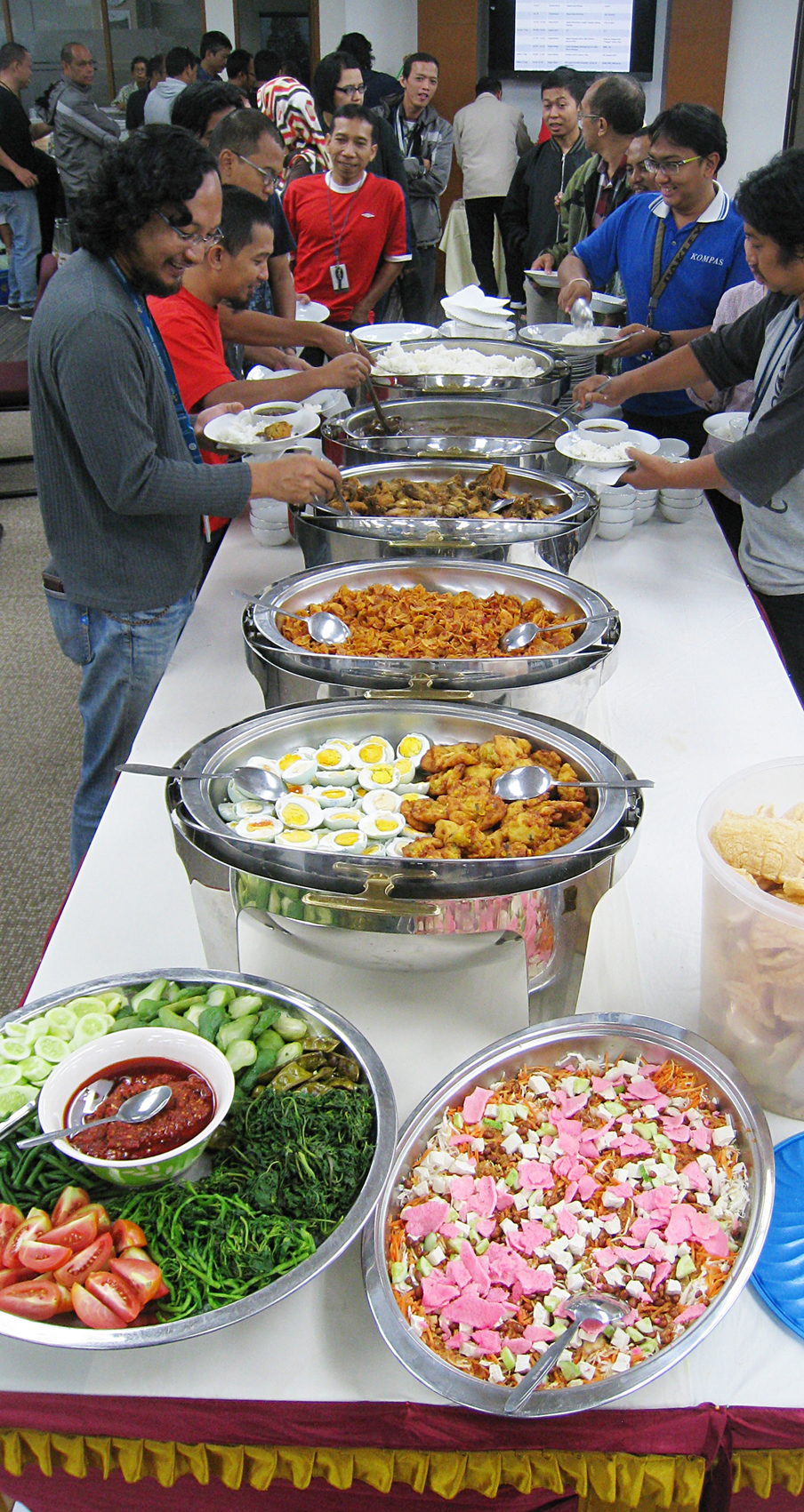
Prasmanan, an Indonesian style buffet

When attending the reception of an Indonesian traditional wedding party, office lunch-time meeting, a seminar or dinner gathering, one usually will find themselves queuing to Indonesian prasmanan; a long table filled with wide array of Indonesian dishes. A prasmanan is quite similar to rijsttafel but without the ceremonial waiters and usually served fewer choices of dishes compared to its flamboyant colonial predecessor. It is an Indonesian buffet as it employs a long table with a wide range of dishes, both savoury and sweet, served on it. It can usually be found in wedding ceremonies or any other festivities. The layout for an Indonesian wedding ceremony buffet is usually: plates, eating utensils (spoon and fork), and paper napkins placed on one end, followed by rice (plain or fried), a series of Indonesian (and sometimes international) dishes, sambal and krupuk (shrimp crackers), and ending with glasses of water on the other end of the table.

== Beverages ==
=== Non-alcoholic beverages ===
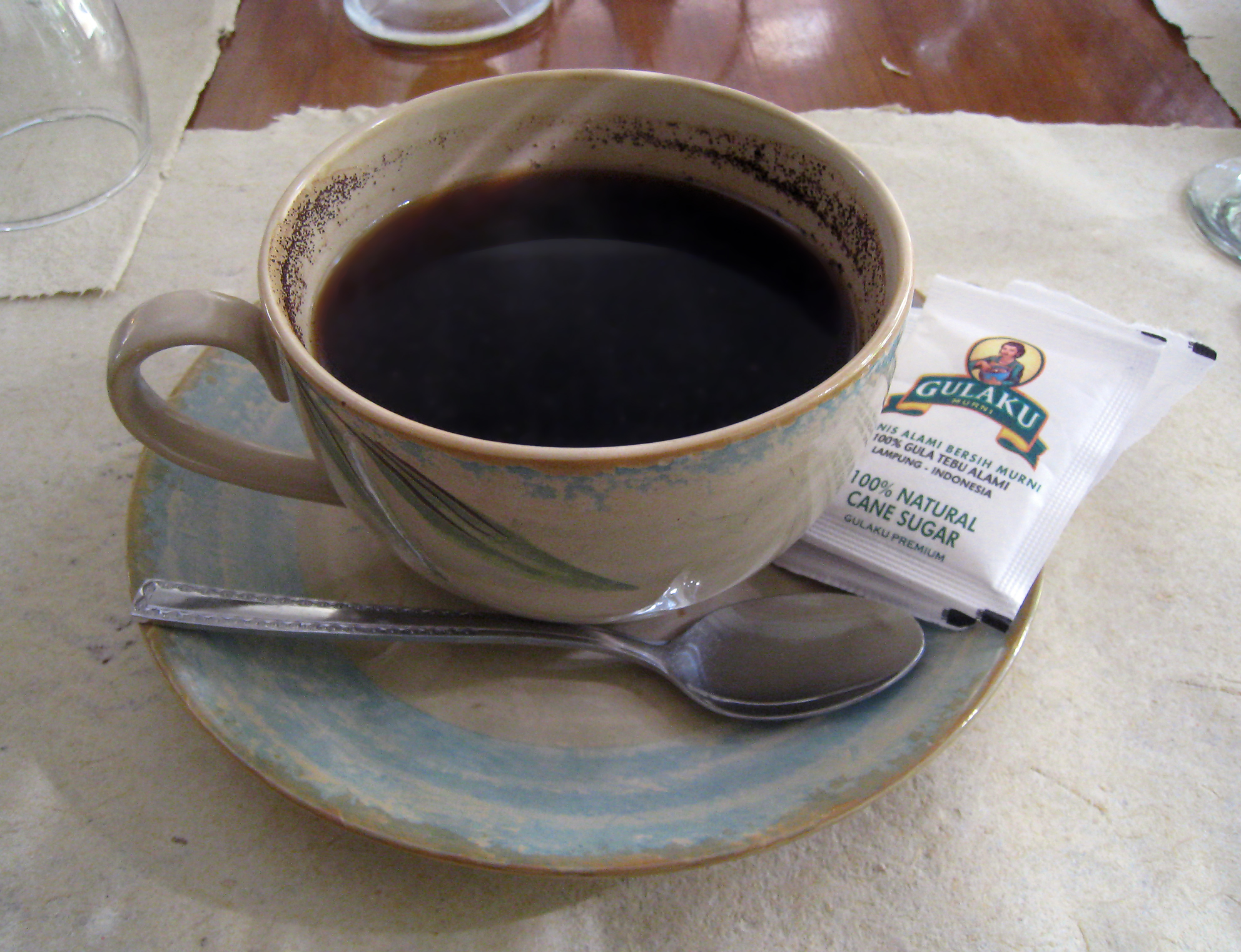
A cup of Java, Javanese kopi tubruk

The most common and popular Indonesian drinks and beverages are teh (tea) and kopi (coffee). Indonesian households commonly serve teh manis (sweet tea) or kopi tubruk to guests. Since the colonial era of Netherlands East Indies, plantations, especially in Java, were major producers of coffee, tea and sugar. Since then hot and sweet coffee and tea beverages have been enjoyed by Indonesians. Jasmine tea is the most popular tea variety drunk in Indonesia, however recent health awareness promotions have made green tea a popular choice. Usually coffee and tea are served hot, but cold iced sweet tea is also frequently drunk. Kopi luwak is Indonesian exotic and expensive coffee beverage made from the beans of coffee berries which have been eaten by the Asian palm civet (Paradoxurus hermaphroditus) and other related civets. Teh botol, bottled sweet jasmine tea, is now quite popular and locally competes favourably with international bottled soda beverages such as Coca-Cola and Fanta. Kopi susu (coffee with sweetened condensed milk) is an Indonesian version of Café au lait. Es kelapa muda or young coconut ice is fresh drink which is made from chilled young coconut water, coconut flesh and syrup. It is among favourite beverage in Indonesia.

Fruit juices (jus) are very popular. Varieties include orange (jus jeruk), guava (jus jambu), mango (jus mangga), soursop (jus sirsak) and avocado (jus alpokat), the last of these being commonly served with condensed milk and chocolate syrup as a dessert-like treat. Durian can be made into ice cream called es durian.

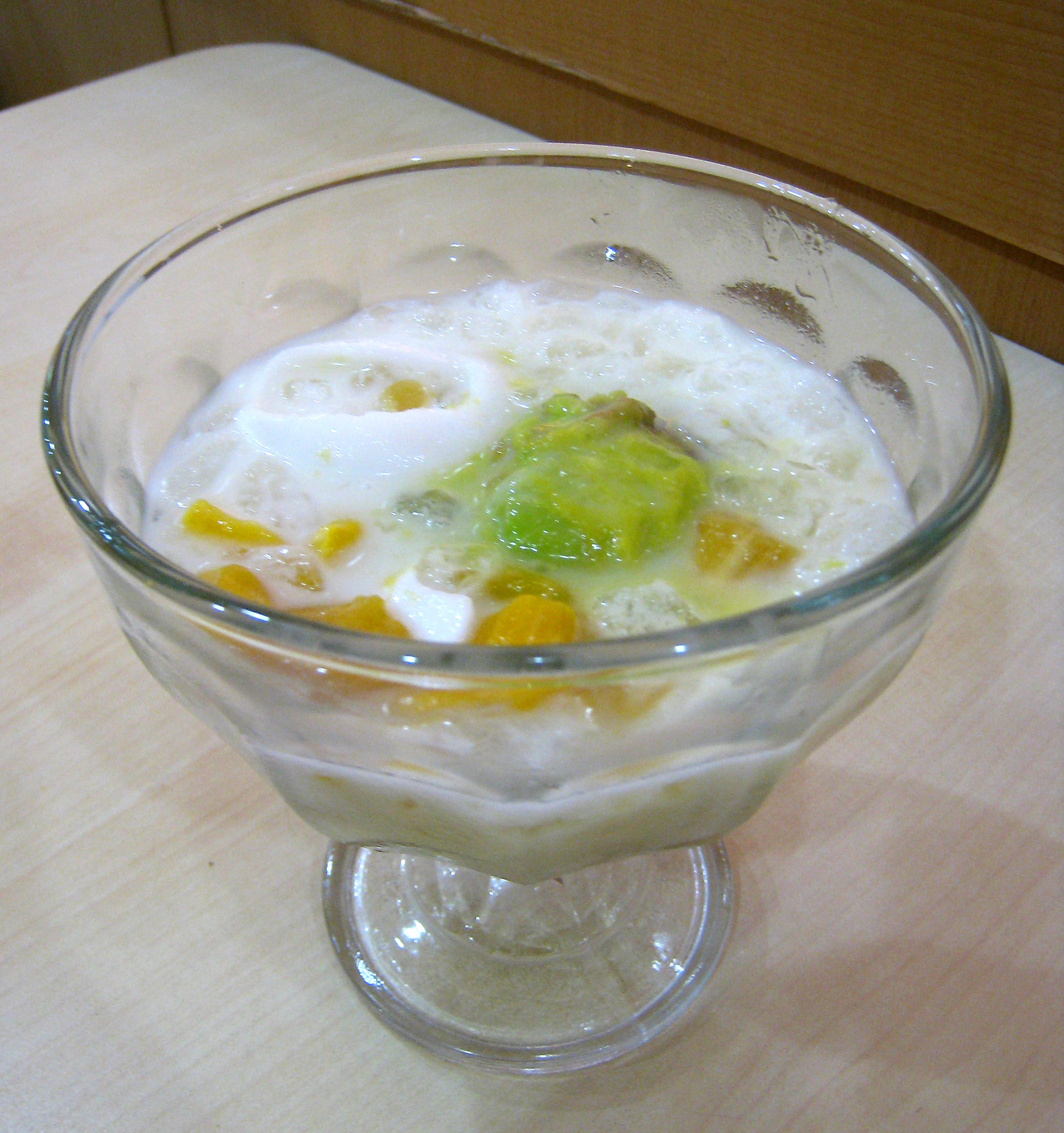
Indonesian dessert es teler, consisting of avocado, jackfruit, and young coconut in shredded ice and condensed milk

Many popular drinks are based on ice (es) and can also be classified as desserts. Typical examples include young coconut (es kelapa muda), grass jelly (es cincau), cendol (es cendol or es dawet), avocado, jackfruit and coconut with shredded ice and condensed milk (es teler), mixed ice (es campur), kidney beans (es kacang merah), musk melon (es blewah), and seaweed (es rumput laut).

Hot sweet beverages can also be found, such as bajigur and bandrek which are particularly popular in West Java. Both are coconut milk or coconut sugar (gula jawa) based hot drinks, mixed with other spices. Sekoteng, a ginger based hot drink which includes peanuts, diced bread, and pacar cina, can be found in Jakarta and West Java. Wedang jahe (hot ginger drink) and wedang ronde (a hot drink with sweet potato balls) are particularly popular in Yogyakarta, Central Java, and East Java.

=== Alcoholic beverages ===
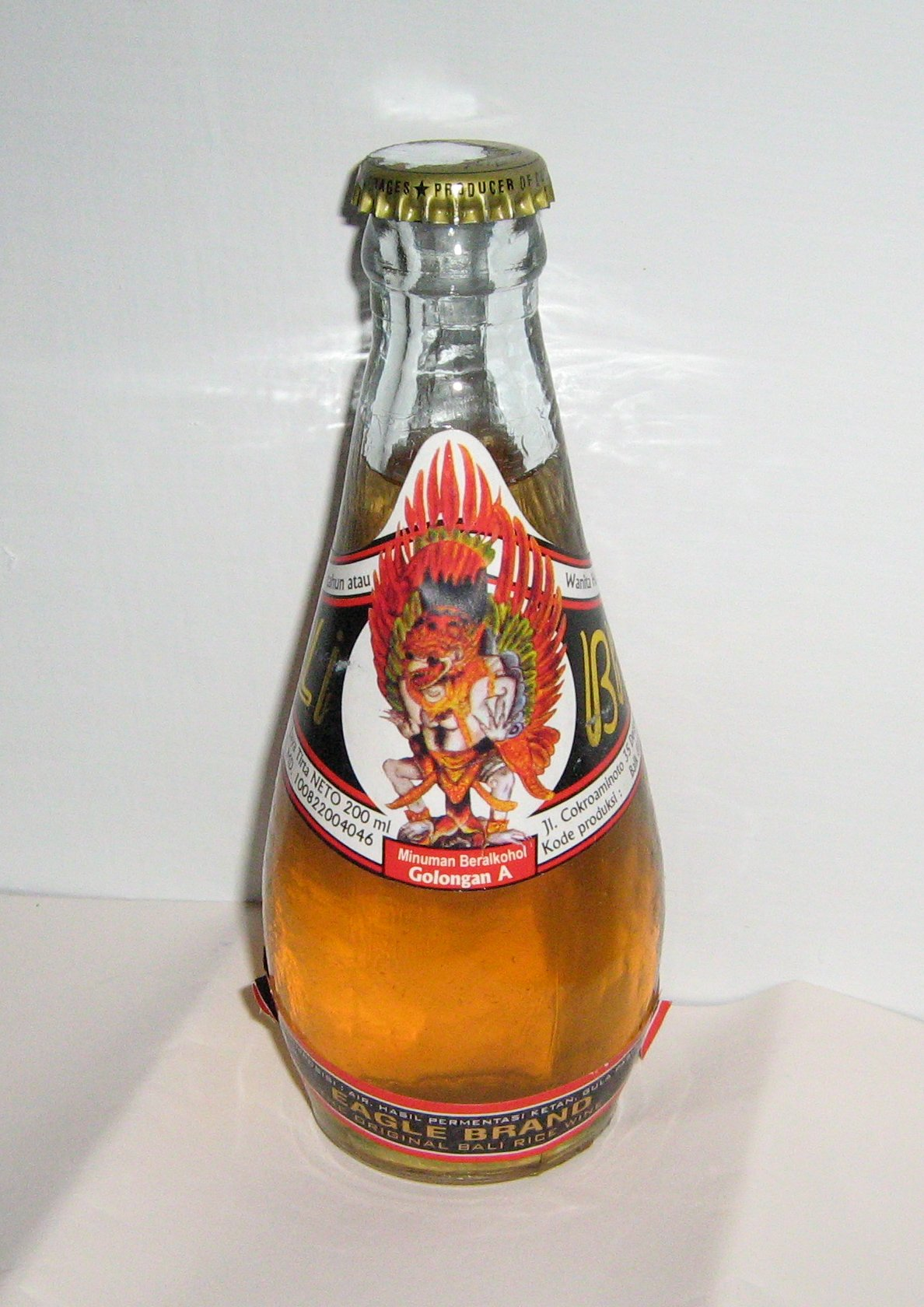
Balinese brem with 5% alcohol content

As a Muslim-majority country, Indonesian Muslims share Islamic dietary laws that prohibit alcoholic beverages. Since ancient times, local alcoholic beverages were developed in the archipelago. According to a Chinese source, people of ancient Java drank wine made from palm sap called tuak (palm wine). Today tuak continues to be popular in the Batak region, North Sumatra. A traditional Batak bar serving tuak is called lapo tuak. In Solo, Central Java, ciu (a local adaptation of Chinese wine) is known. Bottled brem bali (Balinese rice wine) is popular in Bali. In Nusa Tenggara and Maluku Islands the people also drink palm wine, locally known as sopi. In the Minahasa region of North Sulawesi, the people drink a highly alcoholic drink called Cap Tikus. Indonesians developed local brands of beer, such as Bintang Beer and Anker Beer.

== Eating establishment ==
In Indonesia, dishes are served from a fine dining restaurant in five-star hotel, a simple restaurant downtown, humble street side warung under the tent, to street hawker peddling their gerobak (cart) or pikulan (carrying using rod).

=== Restaurant and warung ===
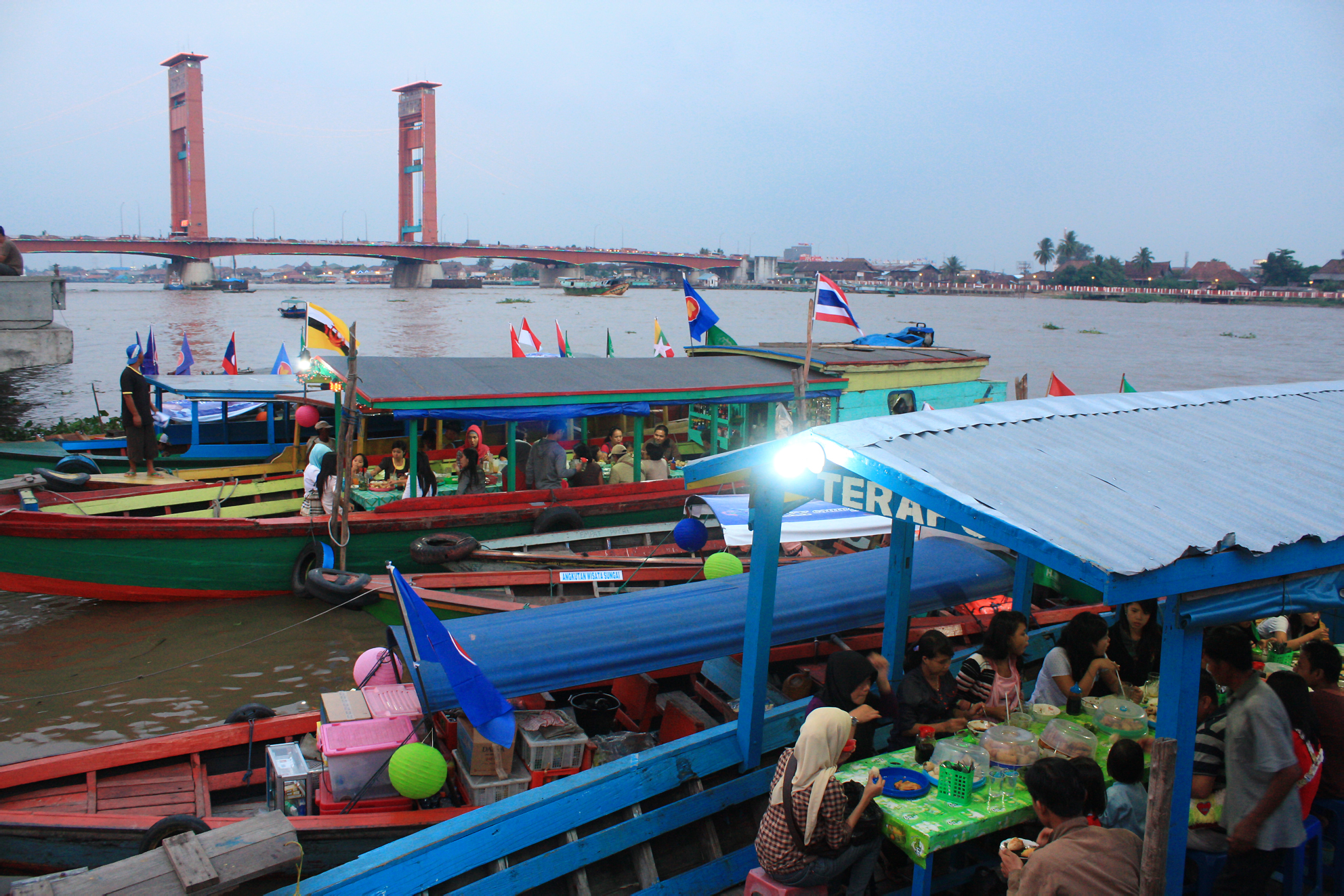
Floating warung boat attached to the bank of Musi river, Palembang, selling local favourite such as pempek

In Indonesia rumah makan means restaurant, while warung means small and humble shop. From these eating establishments, a warteg (warung Tegal) and rumah makan Padang are particularly notable for their ubiquitousness in Indonesian cities and towns.

A warteg or warung tegal is a more specific warung nasi, established by Javanese people from the town Tegal in Central Java. They sells favourite Javanese dishes and rice, the wide array of pre-cooked dishes are arranged in glass windowed cupboard. They are well known on selling modestly priced meals, popular among working class such as low-skilled labours in the cities. While rumah makan Padang is a Padang restaurant, a smaller scale Padang eateries might be called warung Padang.

Most of Indonesian restaurants are based upon specific regional cuisine tradition. For example, rumah makan Padang are definitely Minangkabau cuisine. Sundanese saung restaurant or colloquially called as kuring restaurants are selling Sundanese dishes. This includes Bataks' lapo, Manado and Balinese restaurants. While other restaurants might specifically featuring their best specific dishes, for example Ayam goreng Mbok Berek, Bakmi Gajah Mada, Satay Senayan, Rawon Setan Surabaya, Pempek Pak Raden, etc.

=== Street food ===
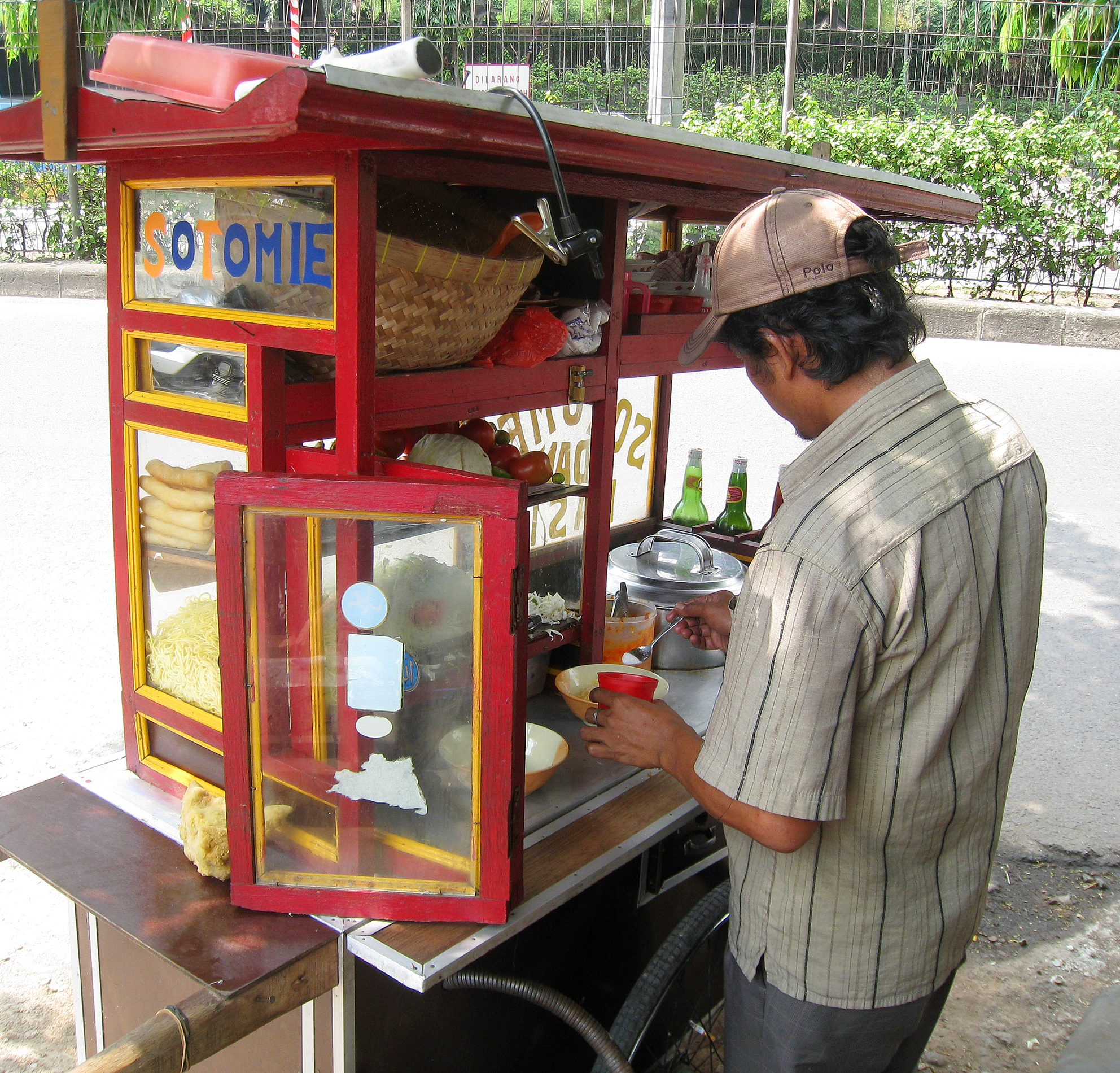
Soto mie cart street vendor

Indonesian street food are usually cheap, offer a great variety of food of different tastes, and can be found on every corner of the city. Street and street-side vendors are common, in addition to hawkers peddling their goods on bicycles or carts. These carts are known as pedagang kaki lima. These food hawkers on carts or bicycles might be travelling on streets, approaching potential buyers through residential areas whilst announcing their presence, or stationing themselves on a packed and busy street side, setting simple seating under a small tent and waiting for customers. Many of these have their own distinctive call, tune, or noise to announce their presence. For example, bakso sellers will hit the side of a soup bowl using a spoon, whereas nasi goreng sellers announce themselves by hitting their wok.

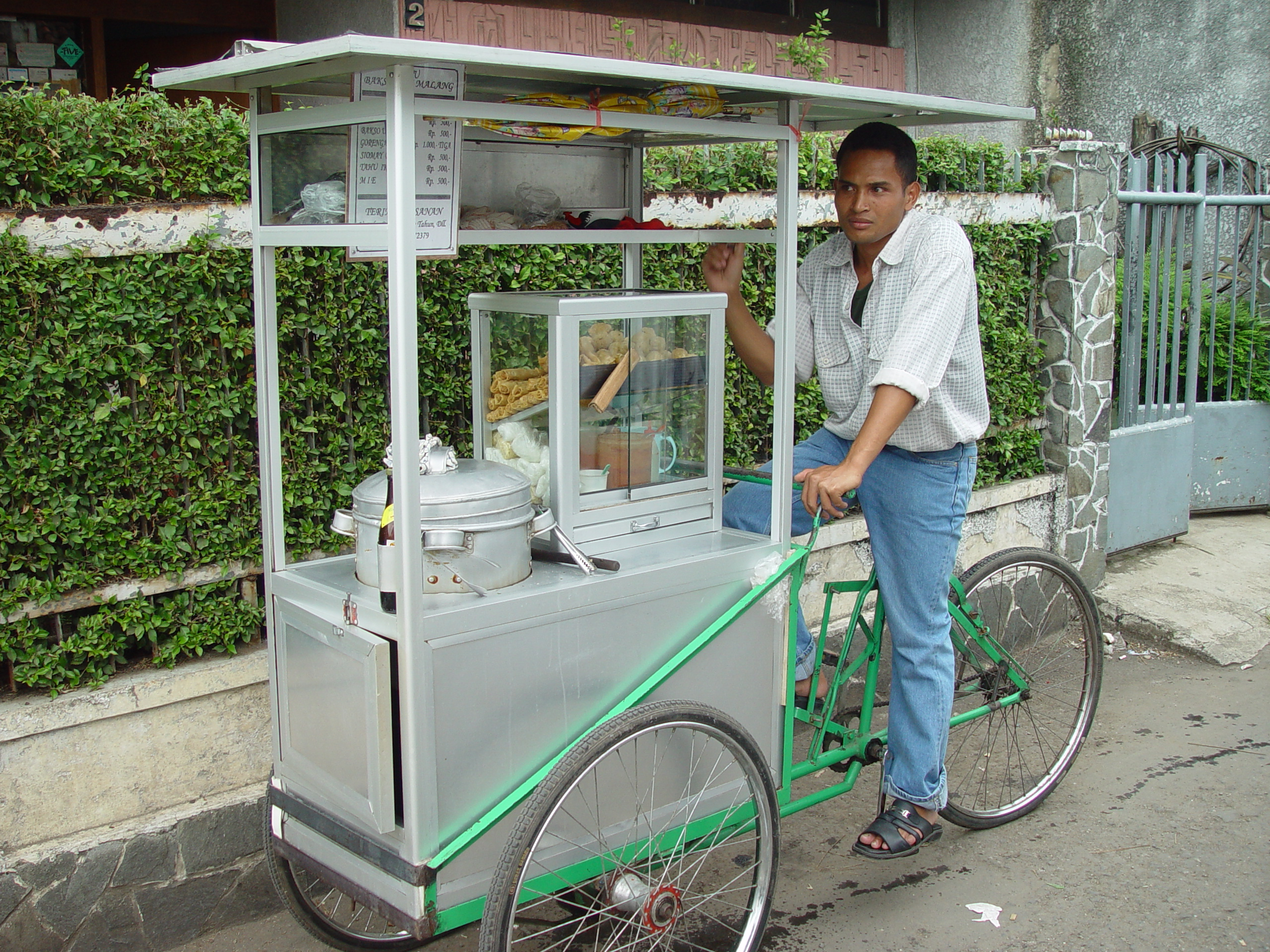
Bakso (meatball) seller in Bandung

In most cities, it is common to see Chinese dishes such as bakpao (steamed buns with sweet and savoury fillings), bakmie (noodles), and bakso (meatballs) sold by street vendors and restaurants, often adapted to become Indonesian-Chinese cuisine. One common adaptation is that pork is rarely used since the majority of Indonesians are Muslims. Other popular Indonesian street food and snacks are siomay and batagor (abbreviated from bakso tahu goreng), pempek (deep fried fish cake), bubur ayam (chicken congee), bubur kacang hijau (mung beans porridge), satay, nasi goreng (English: fried rice), soto mie (soto noodle), mie ayam (chicken noodle) and mie goreng (fried noodle), taoge goreng (mung bean sprouts and noodle salad), asinan (preserved vegetables or fruits salad), laksa, kerak telor (spicy omelette), gorengan (Indonesian assorted fritters) and bakwan (fried dish of beansprouts and batter).

Indonesian street snacks include iced and sweet beverages, such as es cendol or es dawet, es teler, es cincau, es doger, es campur, es potong, and es puter. Indonesian cakes and cookies are often called jajanan pasar (market munchies).

== Snacks ==
=== Kue ===
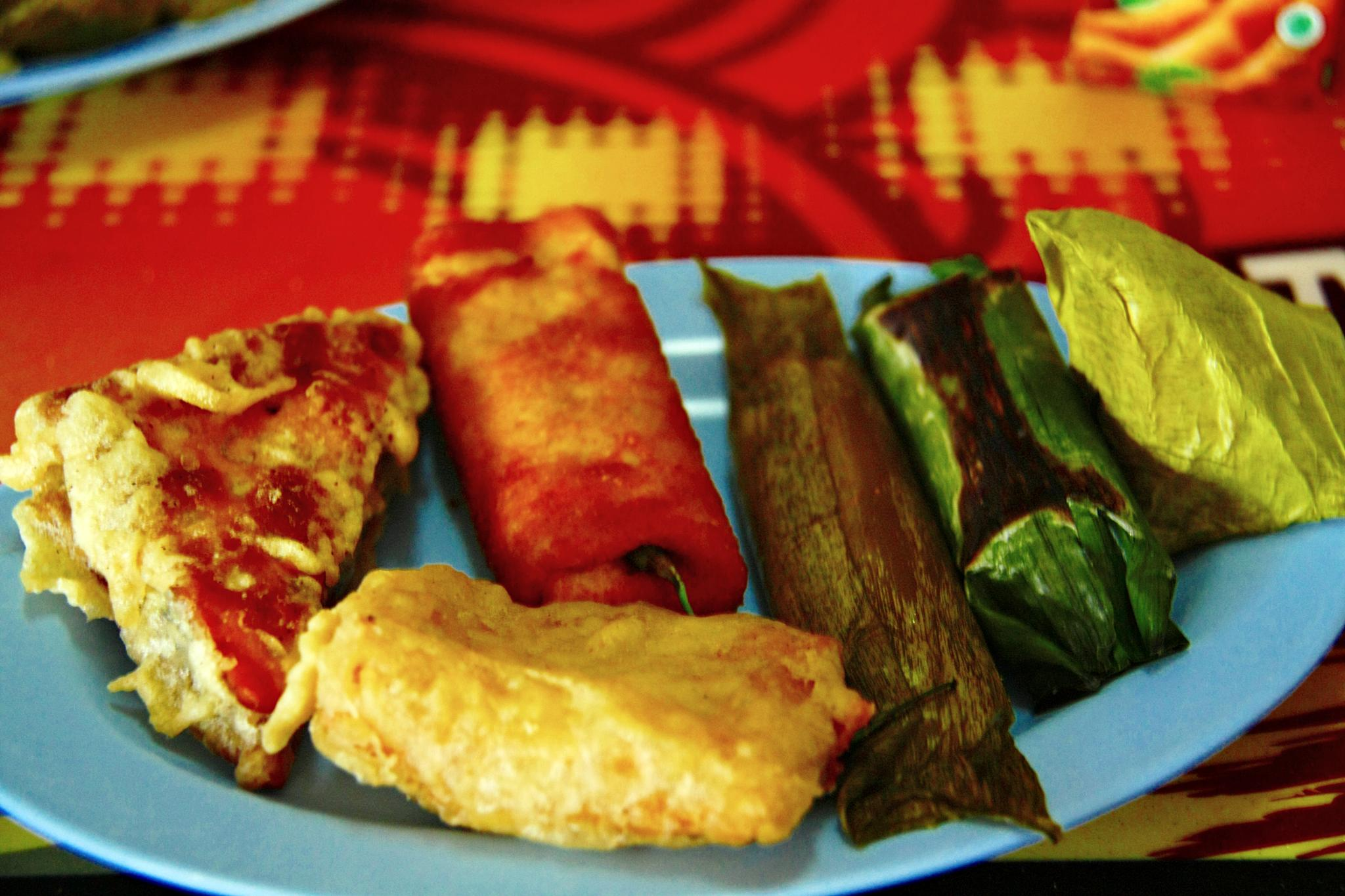
Indonesian snacks, such as tahu isi, pisang goreng, risoles, timpan, lemper, and kue pisang

Indonesia has a rich collection of snacks called kue (cakes and pastry), both savoury and sweet. Traditional kue usually made from rice flour, coconut milk, coconut sugar and mostly steamed or fried instead of baked. Traditional kue are popularly known as kue basah ("wet kue") that has a moist and soft texture because of rich coconut milk. The kue kering (dried kue) is local name for cookies.

Indonesia has rich variations of kue, both native-origin or foreign-influenced. Popular ones include Bika Ambon, kue pisang, kue cubit, klepon, onde-onde, nagasari, kue pandan, lupis, lemang, lemper, lontong, tahu isi, getuk, risoles, pastel, lumpia, bakpia, lapis legit, soes, poffertjes and bolu kukus.

=== Traditional crackers ===
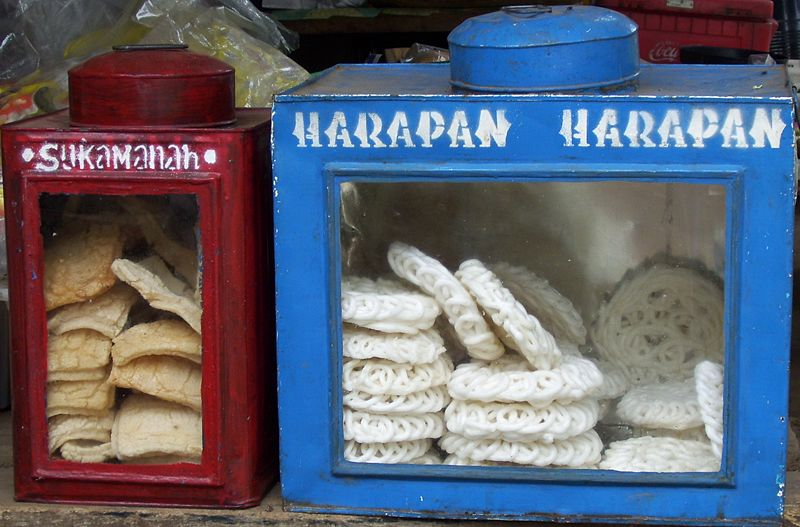
Krupuks in air-tight tin cans

Traditional crackers are called krupuk, made from bits of shrimp, fish, vegetables or nuts, which are usually consumed as a crunchy snack or to accompany main meals. These crispy snacks sometimes are added upon the main meal to provide crunchy texture; several Indonesian dishes such as gado-gado, karedok, ketoprak, lontong sayur, nasi uduk, asinan and bubur ayam are known to require specific type of krupuk as toppings. There are wide variations of krupuk available across Indonesia. The most popular ones would be krupuk udang (prawn crackers) and krupuk kampung or krupuk putih (cassava crackers).

Other popular types include krupuk kulit (dried buffalo-skin crackers), emping melinjo (gnetum gnemon crackers), and kripik (chips or crisps), such as kripik pisang (banana chips) and keripik singkong (Cassava chips), rempeyek, is a flour-based cracker with brittle of peanuts, anchovies or shrimp bound by crispy flour cracker, rengginang or intip (Javanese) is rice cracker made from sun-dried and deep fried leftover rice.

== Fruits ==
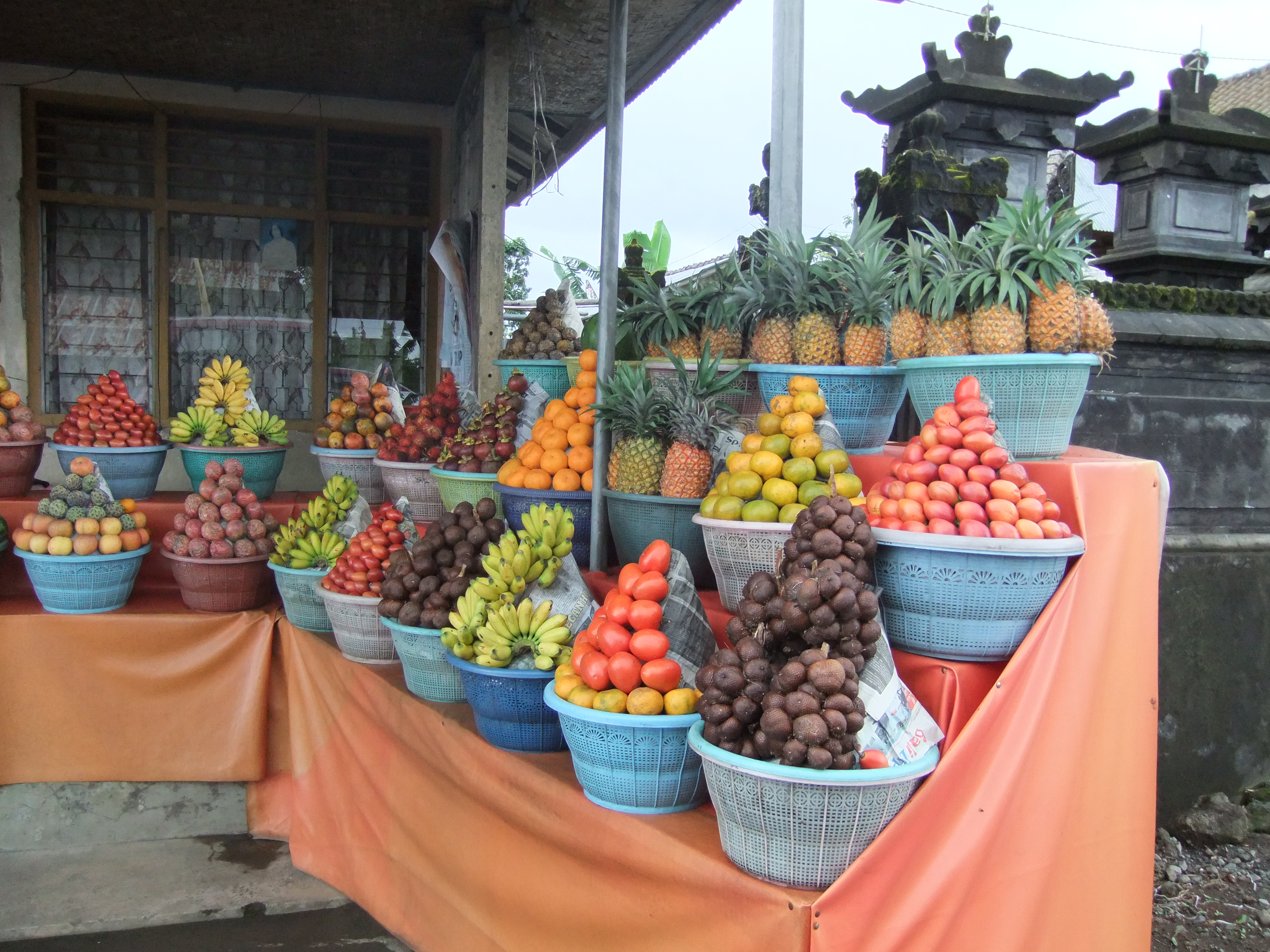
Selection of tropical fruits sold in Bali

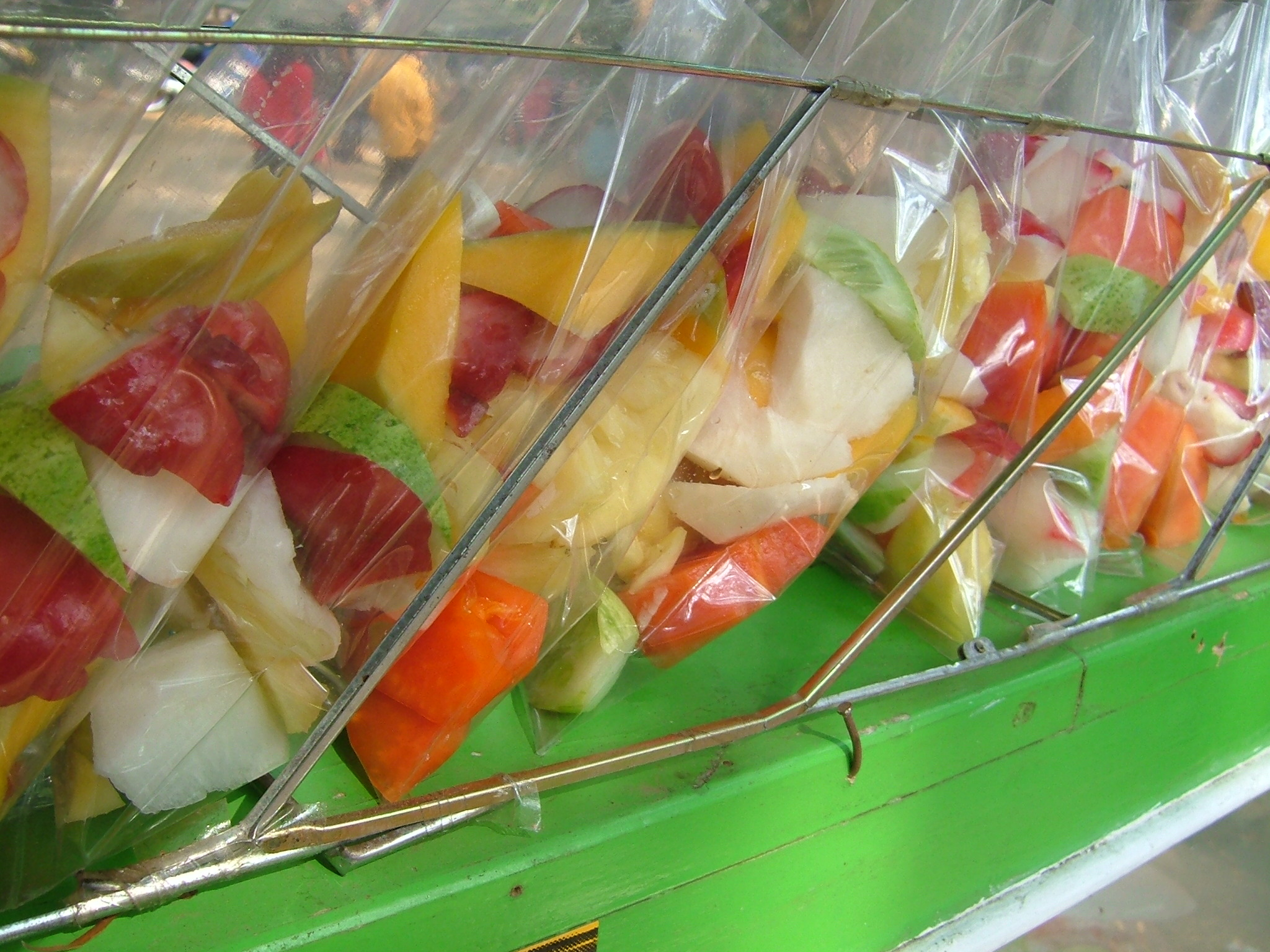
Fruit rujak, consists of slices of unripe mango, jambu air, kedondong, jicama, papaya and pineapple. These fruits are served with thick and spicy coconut sugar and spicy salt.

Indonesian markets abound with many types of tropical fruit. These are an important part of the Indonesian diet, either eaten freshly, or made into juices (such as jus alpukat), desserts (such as es buah and es teler), processed in savoury and spicy dishes like rujak, fried like pisang goreng (fried banana), cooked into cakes (such as kue pisang or bika ambon), sweetened and preserved such as sale pisang and manisan buah, or processed into kripik (crispy chips) as snacks like jackfruit or banana chips.

Many of these tropical fruits such as mangga (mango), manggis (mangosteen), rambutan, cempedak, nangka (jackfruit), durian, jambu air, duku (langsat), jeruk bali (pomelo), belimbing (carambola), kedondong and pisang (banana), are indigenous to Indonesian archipelago; while others have been imported from other tropical countries, although the origin of many of these fruits might be disputed. Klengkeng (longan) were introduced from India, semangka (watermelon) from Africa, kesemek from China, while alpukat (avocado), sawo, markisa (passionfruit), sirsak (soursop), nanas (pineapple), jambu biji (guava) and pepaya (papaya) were introduced from the Americas. Many of these tropical fruits are seasonally available, according to each species flowering and fruiting seasons. While certain fruits such as banana, watermelon, pineapple and papaya are available all year round.

Today, Indonesian markets is also enrichen with selections of home-grown non-tropical fruits that is not native to Indonesia. Strawberry, melon, apple, pear and dragon fruit are introduced and grown in cooler Indonesian highlands such as Malang in mountainous East Java, Puncak and Lembang near Bandung, to mimic their native subtropics habitat.

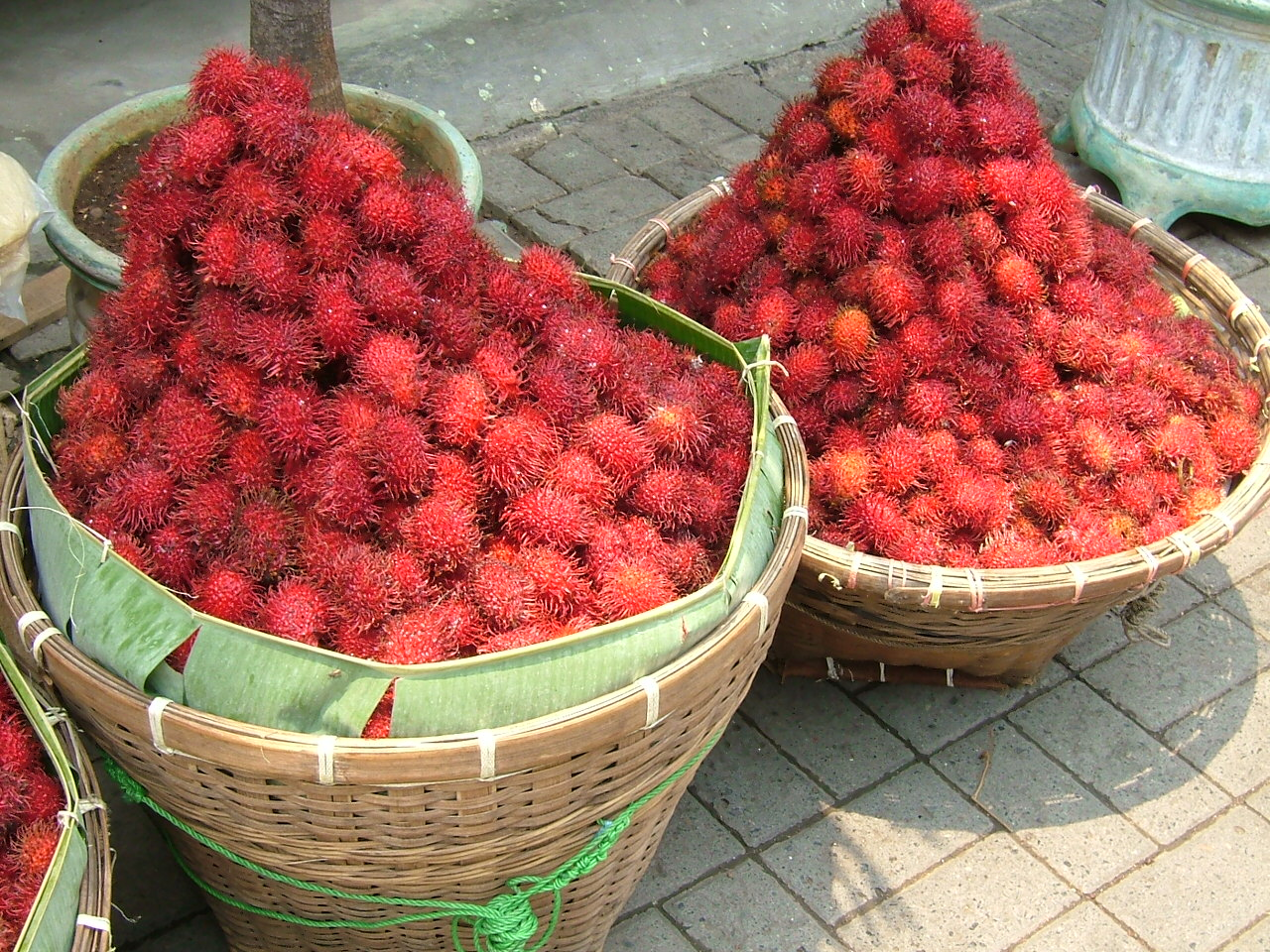
Rambutan for sale at a market in Jakarta

In the last few years, fruit chips have been more and more various. In the old times, banana and jackfruit chips were the most common, but now Indonesian fruit chips are also made from strawberry, apple, dragonfruit, pepino, watermelon, melon, more. Malang, a city in East Java, is the centre of fruit chip production aside from tempeh chips.

Banana and coconut are particularly important, not only to Indonesian cuisine, but also in other uses, such as timber, bedding, roofing, oil, plates and packaging. Banana leaf and janur (young coconut leaf) are particularly important for packaging and cooking process, employed to make pepes, lontong and ketupat.

== Health ==
=== Nutrition ===
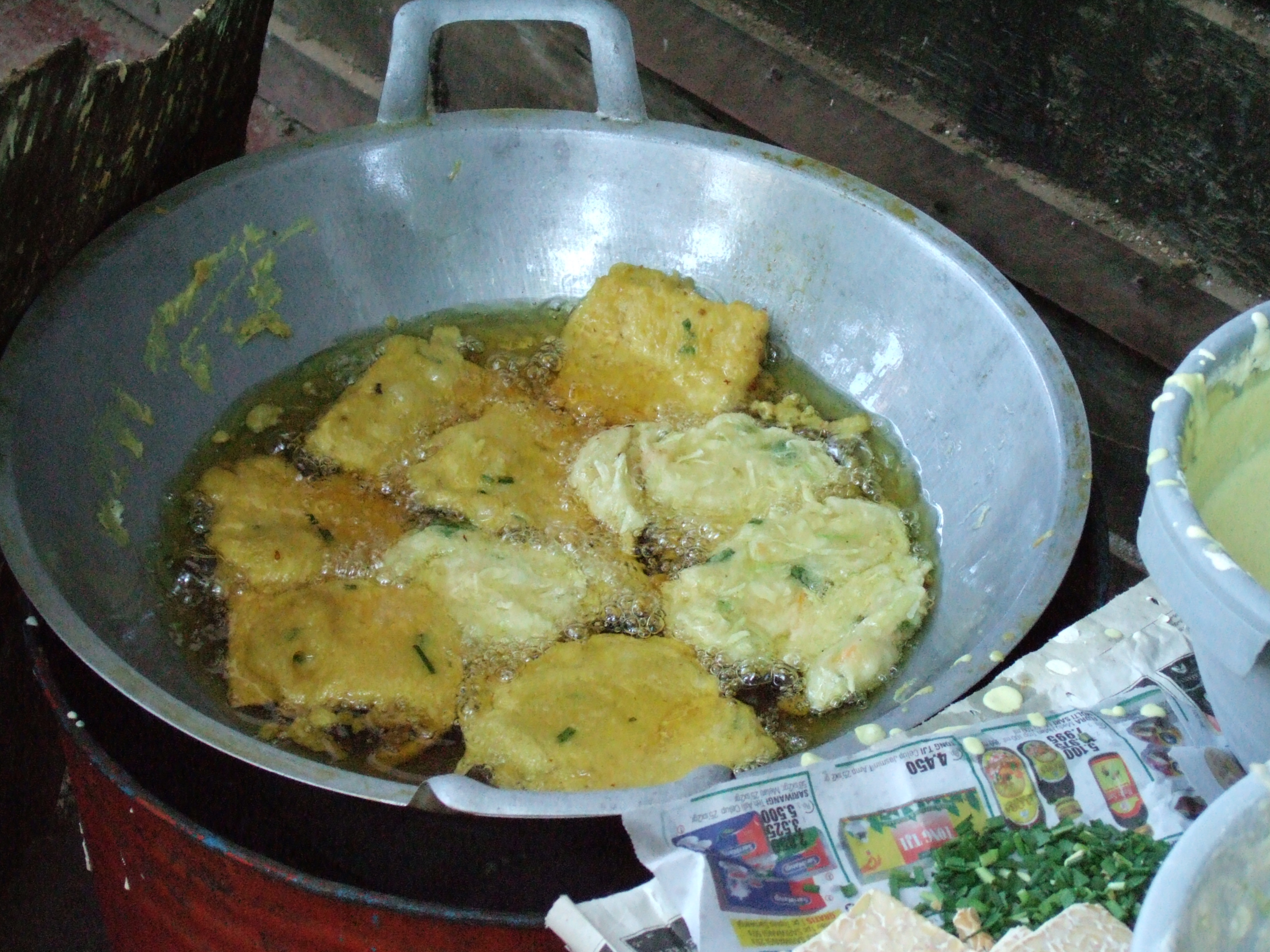
Deep frying mendoan tempeh. Indonesian food is often prepared by deep frying which adds saturated fat and cholesterol.

Much carbohydrate intake in Indonesian cuisine comes from rice, while in eastern parts of Indonesia, yam and sago are common. Indonesian protein intake comes from soy bean products that are processed into tofu and tempeh. Chicken eggs, poultry and meats are also consumed. Most of the fat intake comes from cooking oil (coconut oil) of fried dishes, coconut milk, peanuts, as well as meats and offals.

Some Indonesian fruit and vegetable dishes such as fruit rujak, gado-gado, karedok, pecel, lalab, capcay, tofu and tempeh are foods with low fat and high fibre. Tempeh, for example, is a vegetarian substitute for meat. Some dishes, especially gorengan (deep-fried fritters) and those dishes infused or caramelised with coconut milk, such as rendang and gulai, might taste succulent but are rich in saturated fat.

=== Food safety ===
The authentic traditional Indonesian home cooking is freshly made and consumed daily with minimal or no processed, canned or preserved foods, which means there is a minimal amount of preservatives and sodium. Most ingredients are bought fresh very early in the morning from local traditional markets, cooked around the late morning and consumed mainly for lunch. The leftovers are stored in the cupboard or on the table covered with tudung saji (weaved bamboo food cover to protect the food from insects or other animals), all in room temperature to be heated and consumed again for dinner. Traditionally, Indonesian dishes are rarely stored for long periods of time, thus most of these dishes are cooked and consumed in the same day. Some exceptions apply to dried, salted, and processed food. For example, dry rendang may still be safe to consume for several days. Modern refrigeration technology is available in most households.

=== Hygiene ===
While most of Indonesian grocery products and food served in mid to upperscale eating establishments maintain food hygiene standard ranges from good to acceptable — regulated and supervised by Badan Pengawasan Obat dan Makanan (Indonesian Food and Drug Administration) — some warung traditional foodstalls and street vendors might have poor hygiene. The tropical microbes also might contribute to food poisoning cases mostly gastroenteritis, especially among foreigners during their stay in Indonesia. It is advisable to drink bottled or boiled drinking water, or choose cooked hot food instead of uncooked room temperatured ones sold by street vendors.

== See also ==
- Bumbu (seasoning)
- Indonesian noodles
- Kue
- Thai cuisine
- Filipino cuisine
- Malaysian cuisine
- List of Indonesian beverages
- List of Indonesian condiments
- List of Indonesian desserts
- List of Indonesian dishes
- List of Indonesian snacks
- List of Indonesian soups
- Christmas Island cuisine
- Cocos (Keeling) Islands cuisine

== Bibliography ==
- Owen, Sri. "Indonesian Food and Cookery" ISBN 978-0907325000, Prospect Books, 1980.
- Owen, Sri. "Sri Owen's Indonesian Food" ISBN 978-1910496718, Pavilion Books, 2015.
- Wongso, William. "Flavors of Indonesia: William Wongso's Culinary Wonders", ISBN 978-9798926327 Bab Publishing, 2016.
- Ford, Eleanor. "Fire Islands: Recipes from Indonesia", ISBN 978-1911632047 Murdoch Books, 2019.
