= Nasi katok =

Bruneian rice dish

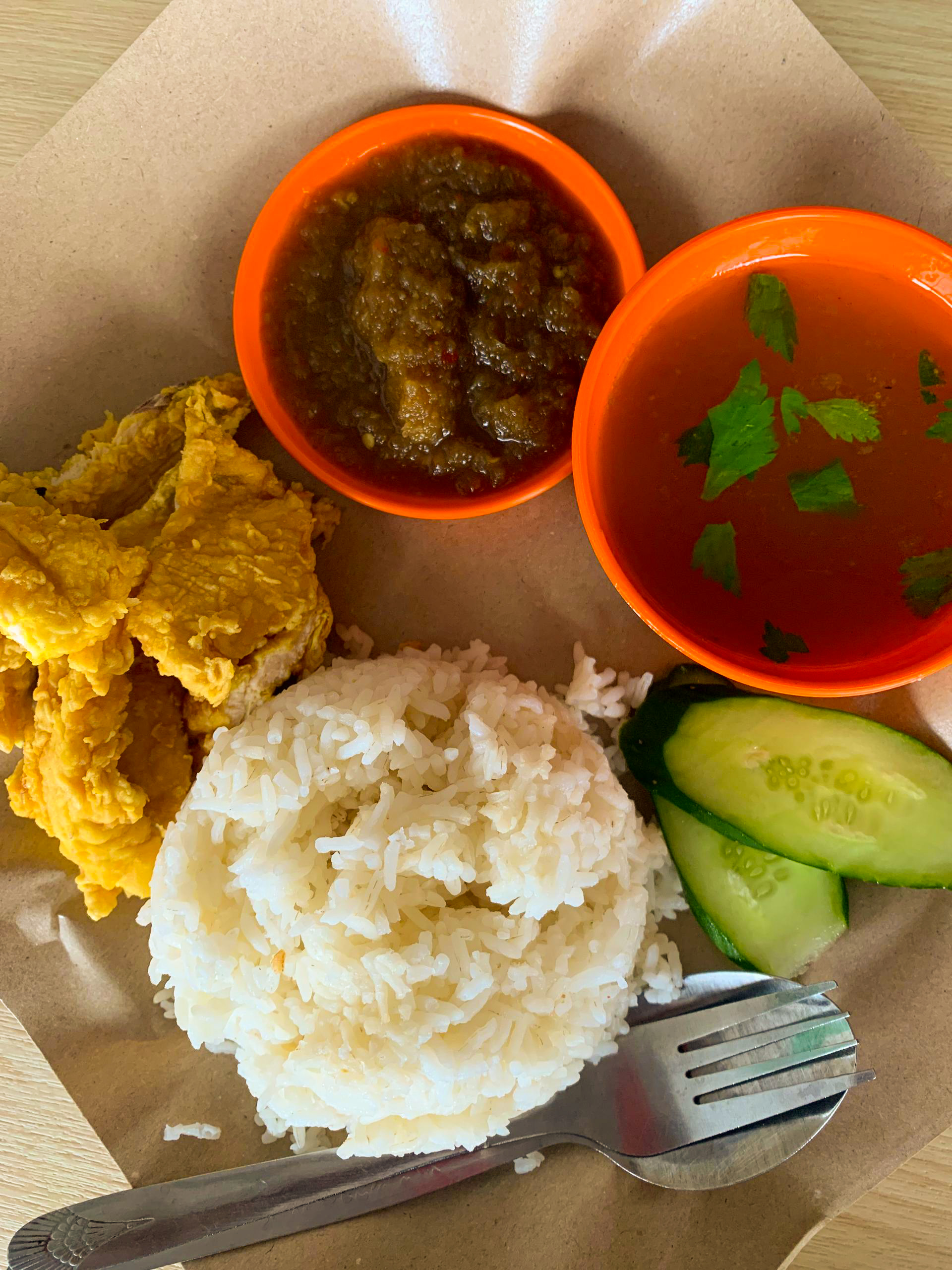
- A classic rendition of nasi katok
- Course: Main course
- Place of origin: Brunei
- Region or state: Brunei
- Serving temperature: Hot or room temperature
- Main ingredients: Best known for its serving of ayam goreng with rice and sambal; alternative versions are also available

Nasi katok (Jawi: ناسي كاتوق) is a dish originating from Brunei. Nasi katok is traditionally composed of steamed rice, ayam goreng (fried chicken) and a spicy chilli sambal sauce, often presented as individual servings wrapped in brown paper or contained within boxes.

While the fundamental components of nasi katok remain consistent, its preparation methods and ingredient choices for both the protein and sambal can vary significantly among vendors and eateries. This variation allows for a range of flavours and textures to cater to different preferences.

== Availability ==
Found throughout Brunei, the dish is readily available from roadside stalls to well-established restaurants and convenience stores. Its popularity surged in the late 2000s, propelled by the emergence of franchises and 24-hour dining establishments specialising in the dish. This culinary trend also solidified its status as Brunei's indigenous fast food equivalent.

Today, several chains have emerged in Brunei, each serving the local speciality with their own recipe, interpretations and styles. Among these establishments are Nasi Katok Kaka, Nasi Katok Mama, Nasi Katok Lily and Nasi Katok Nailis.

Additionally, nasi katok can also be found in cities and towns across East Malaysia that share robust socioeconomic connections with Brunei. These include Miri, Limbang, Lawas, Labuan, Sipitang, Papar and Kota Kinabalu. Reflecting the cultural exchange and cross-border influences, variations of this dish are offered in these regions.

== History ==
The dish derives its name from the Bruneian Malay terminology denoting rice ("nasi") and the action of knocking ("katok", Standard Malay: "ketuk"). This nomenclature finds its origins in the historical practice wherein patrons would signal their presence by knocking on the doors of rice vendors to initiate their orders.

According to popular accounts, the origins of nasi katok can be traced back to the 1980s when a Chinese family embarked on a venture in their residence at the Low San Flat, situated within the Mabohai area. Specialising in nasi pusu, a dish featuring anchovy-sambal rice, they became popular among locals, serving customers until late at night. This early endeavour is frequently regarded as the genesis of nasi katok, laying the groundwork for what eventually became the first informal nasi katok establishment.

Visitors would come to the family's home and knock on the door to purchase their food. The practice may reflect an era when doorbells were not commonplace, making knocking the customary method for patrons to announce their presence and request to purchase rice. This method of placing orders, aimed to create a distinctive and intimate dining experience. The legacy of Nasi Katok Mabohai, recognised as the pioneering nasi katok venue in Brunei, endures.

== Characteristics ==
=== Traditional ===
The preparation of fried chicken for the nasi katok encompasses a multitude of approaches, each contributing to its unique flavour profile. One method involves coating the chicken in flour for enhanced crispiness. Alternatively, the recipe may call for infusing the chicken with turmeric, adding a vibrant colour and aromatic essence, enhancing both its flavour and depth.

Furthermore, some versions prefer to marinate the chicken with an assortment of spices. This infusion of flavours results in a more nuanced and complex taste experience, further enriching the overall dish. These diverse preparation methods provide consumers with a selection of options, each offering its own distinct characteristics and nuances, thus enhancing the culinary experience of Nasi Katok.

=== Contemporary innovations ===
In recent times, there has been a diversion from the traditional chilli sambal to a variety of non-traditional sambals to nasi katok. Examples include tomato sambal, gravy and buttermilk sauce.

Businesses have also diversified from selling just fried chicken (ayam goreng), now offering beef rendang, grilled lamb, mussels, lobsters, tofu, and tempeh as other protein options.

=== Affordability ===
Despite fluctuations in ingredient costs, including a recent uptick due to pandemic-related factors, nasi katok remains an accessible and satisfying meal option, particularly with its reputation for affordability, especially in Brunei Darussalam. While some vendors have adjusted the basic nasi katok prices slightly to B$1.50 to manage rising expenses, others have chosen to maintain the original B$1 price point, reflecting the diverse approaches taken by vendors in response to economic factors.

== See also ==
- Bruneian cuisine
- Malay cuisine
- Ayam penyet
- Chicken inasal
- Nasi campur
- Nasi lemak
- Nasi kucing
