= Kedai Makan =

Malaysian restaurant in Seattle, Washington, U.S.

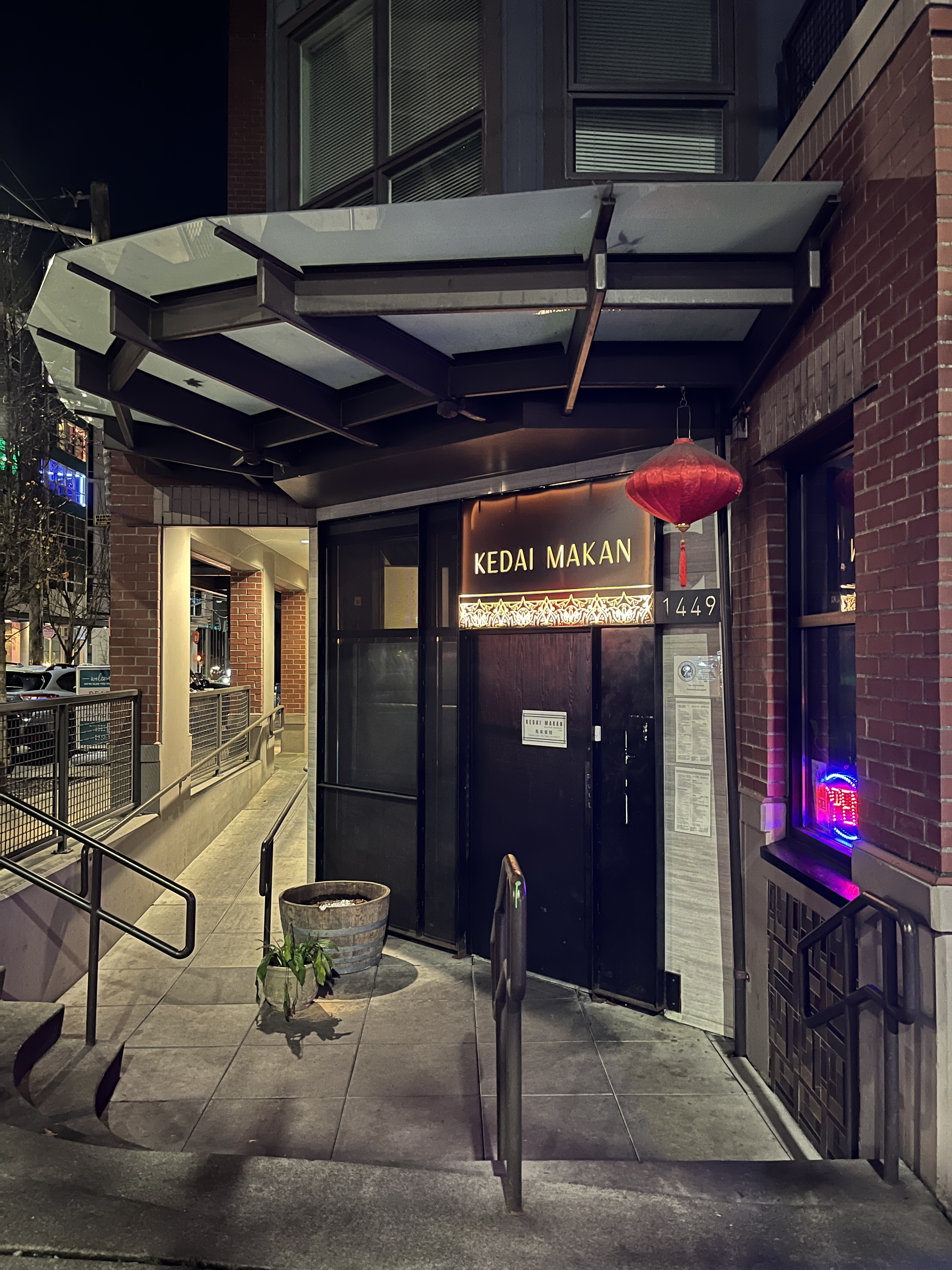
- The restaurant's main entrance, 2023
- Interactive map of Kedai Makan

Restaurant information
- Previous owners: Kevin Burzell; Alysson Wilson
- Food type: Malaysian
- Location: 1449 East Pine Street, Seattle, King, Washington, 98122, United States
- Coordinates: 47°36′55″N 122°18′47″W
- Website: kedaimakansea.com

Kedai Makan is a Malaysian restaurant on Seattle's Capitol Hill, in the US state of Washington.

It was originally owned by Kevin Burzell and Alysson Wilson, who opened the first brick-and-mortar location in 2013 after starting as a pop-up. Kedai Makan closed in October 2022, but has since reopened under new ownership. In May 2024, the restaurant expanded to a second location in Belltown.

== Description ==
The Malaysian restaurant Kedai Makan operates on Seattle's Capitol Hill. Its menu has included ayam goreng masala, chili pan mee, duck noodles, nasi goreng belacan, nasi lemak, pho, and sarawak laksa. The restaurant has also served a burger, fried frog legs, Malaccan-style Hainanese chicken, pickled veggies, roti with lentil curry, "sweet-spicy" tofu, and tripe. The Ngow Lam Fan has noodles with stewed beef, five spice, beef ball, peanuts, and mustard greens.

== History ==
Initially a pop-up restaurant, the original brick-and-mortar location opened in 2013. It took over the space previously occupied by Taco Gringos on Olive Way in January, with next door "sibling" dive bar Montana Bar (or simply Montana). It continued to offer murtabak (stuffed pancake) and a line of bottled sauces at the Capitol Hill Farmers Market, as of 2014.

Kedai Makan expanded from a take-out operation to a full service establishment during 2015. The restaurant closed in October 2022, but has since reopened under new ownership.

Kedai Makan has also hosted pop-ups, such as the German business Dackel in 2013–2014.

In May 2025, Kedai Makan opened a second location at 2234 1st Avenue in Seattle's Belltown neighborhood.

== Reception ==
Eater Seattle included Kedai Makan in 2014 lists of the city's 38 "essential" restaurants. In 2016, Providence Cicero of The Seattle Times gave the restaurant a three-star rating, and The Stranger's Angela Garbes complimented the owners, saying their "affection for and study of Malaysian food is evident in the restaurant's complex, boldly flavored dishes".
