= Indomie =

Indonesian instant noodle brand

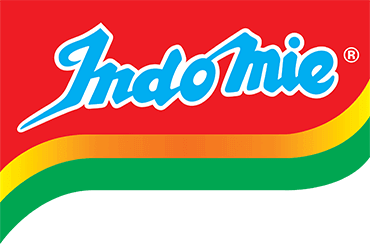

- Indomie packagings sold in Indonesia.
- Product type: Instant noodle
- Current owner: Indofood
- Country: Indonesia
- Introduced: 1972; 54 years ago
- Markets: Worldwide
- Tagline: Indomie, Seleraku! lit. 'Indomie, my taste!' (Indonesia); Flavour, Favoured by The World (worldwide); Tasty Nutrition. Good For You. (Nigeria); Delicious, economical, practical./ Ready flavor in three minutes. (Turkey)
- Website: indomie.com

Indomie is an instant noodle brand produced by the Indonesian company Indofood. Indomie is among the largest instant noodle manufacturers in the world, with 17 factories. Over 19 billion packs of Indomie are produced annually, and exported to more than 80 countries. Indomie has been produced primarily in Indonesia since its launch in 1972. It has also been produced in Nigeria since 1995, Turkey since 2010, and Serbia since 2016. Since its introduction in the region in the 1980s, Indomie has become increasingly popular in African countries.

== Background ==
=== History ===
Indomie's name is a portmanteau from Indo for "Indonesia" and mie, an older spelling of the Indonesian word for "noodles", mi.

Instant noodles were introduced into the Indonesian market in 1969. Indofood is one of Indonesia's largest pre-packaged food companies, which was founded in 1982 by Sudono Salim (1916–2012), an Indonesian tycoon who also owned Bogasari Flour Mills.

The Indomie instant noodle brand was first produced in June 1972 by PT Sanmaru Food Manufacturing Co. Ltd. with the Indomie Kuah Rasa Kaldu Ayam (chicken broth) flavour with the Indomie Kuah Rasa Kari Ayam (chicken curry) flavour being produced later in 1980. In 1982, PT Sanmaru Food launched its first dry variant (served without soup), Indomie Mi Goreng (fried noodles), which quickly became popular in the Indonesian market.

In 1984, PT Sanmaru Food was acquired by PT Sarimi Asli Jaya, which was owned by Bogasari flour mills, before they merged into PT Indofood Sukses Makmur Tbk in 1994. Indomie accounted for around 70 per cent of the instant noodle market in Indonesia in 2010.

Indomie won multiple awards, including the Lausanne Index Prize (L.I.P.), the Indonesia Best Brand Award (IBBA), the Most Effective Ad Award, the Indonesia Consumer Satisfaction Award (ICSA), and the Indonesia Best Packaging Award.

=== Timeline ===
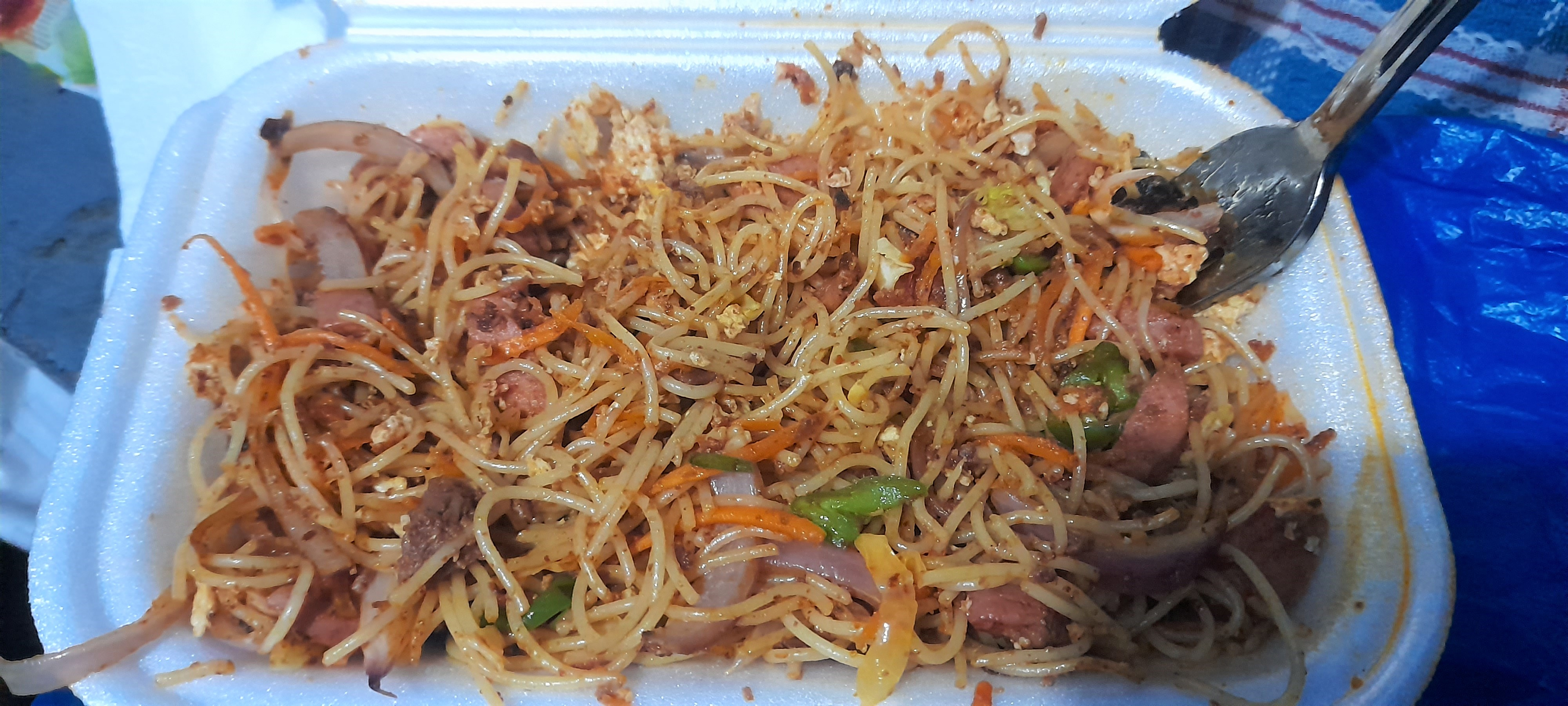
Indomie in Ghana

- 1972: Indomie was first introduced to the market in Indonesia, produced by PT Sanmaru Foods Manufacturing Co. Ltd.
- 1982: Indomie introduces a new Indomie flavor variant "Mi Goreng" based on the Indonesian dish "Mie goreng", and Indomie has been distributed to several countries through exports.
- 1988: Indomie was introduced in Nigeria through exports from Indonesia.
- 1995: Indomie opened its first production factory in Nigeria under Dufil Prima Foods – the first instant noodles manufacturing plant of its kind in Nigeria and the largest in Africa.
- 2005: Indomie broke the Guinness Book of World Records category for "The Largest Packet of Instant Noodles" by creating a packet that was 3.4m x 2.355m x 0.47m, with a net weight of 664.938 kg, which is about 8,000 times the weight of a regular pack of instant noodles. It was made using the same ingredients as a regular pack of instant noodles and was certified fit for human consumption.
- 13 December 2009: Roger Ebert put Indomie on his "Twelve Gifts of Christmas".
- 3 January 2010: Indomie released its new design in Indonesia. This design started being used in export markets in the mid-2010s (replacing the 2005–2009 design), with the Philippines and Hong Kong being the last countries to adopt this design in February and June 2022, respectively (replacing the 2001–2004 design), followed by Japan in January 2026 (replacing the 2005–2009 design). The previous 2005–2009 design was retained for Rasa Ayam Spesial (special chicken flavour) 68 gram packaging in Indonesia (albeit with 2019 minor revision in serving suggestion illustration) until replaced with the current 2010 design in September 2026 (the current 2010 design was also available for Rasa Ayam Spesial 70 gram packaging until mid-2010s before being used on current 68 gram packaging).
- 7 October 2010: in Taipei, the Taipei County Public Health Bureau announced that cosmetic preservatives were found in Indomie instant noodle products and ordered all vendors to withdraw the product from the market. On 11 October, Indofood released an official statement: "The Company believes that the recent reports in the Taiwanese media arose concerning instant noodle products manufactured by ICBP that were not intended for the Taiwanese market." The authorities there have since allowed the instant noodle products to re-enter the Taiwan market on 6 May 2011.
- 11 January 2016: Australian singer-songwriter Courtney Barnett released a song, "Three packs a day" about Mi goreng on a compilation on her record label Milk!
- 31 October 2024: Indomie appointed South Korean girl group NewJeans as its global brand ambassador for Mi Goreng, as well as local brand ambassador for Korean Ramyeon series in Indonesia.

== Products ==
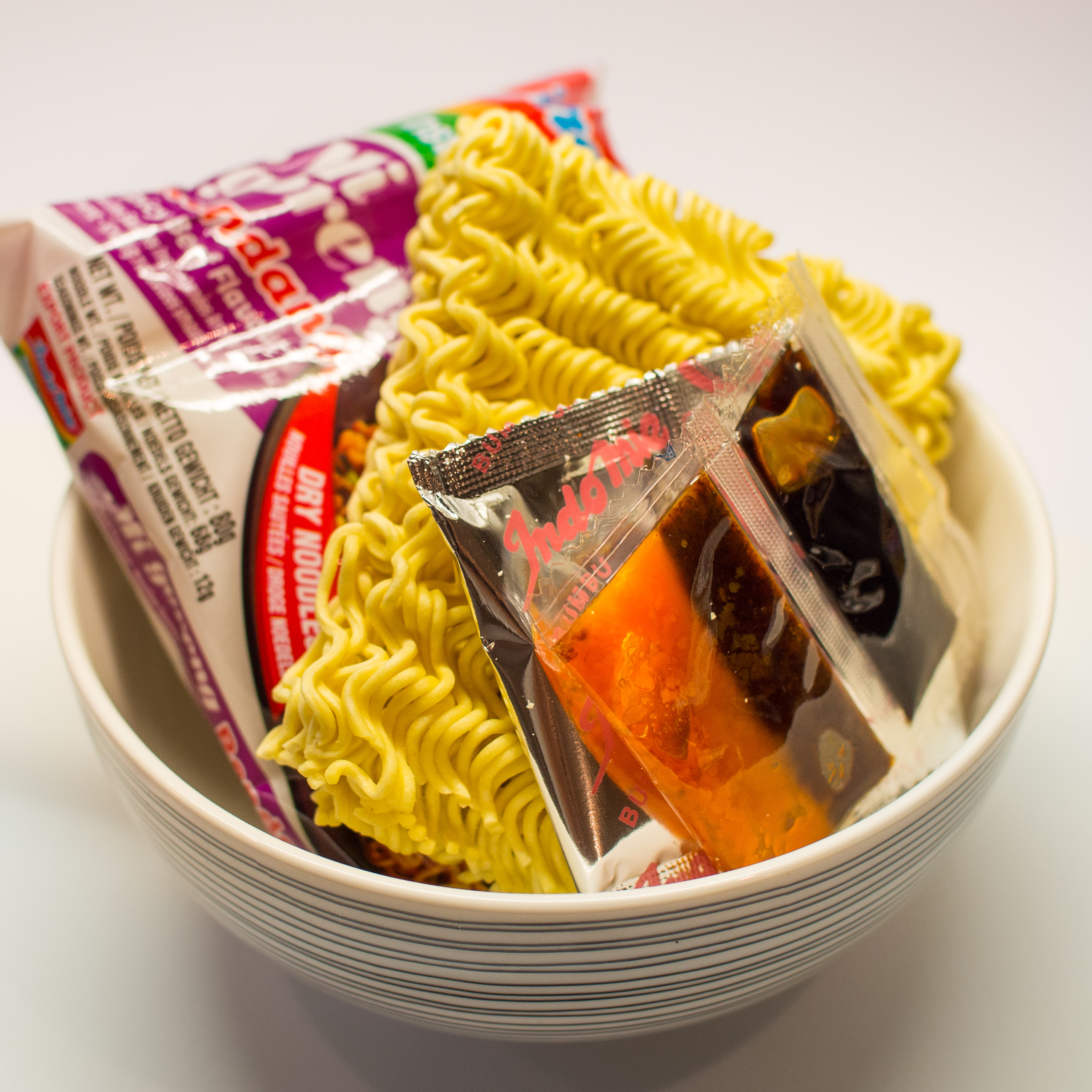
The contents of a packet of mi goreng rendang

Indomie noodles come in a variety of brands and flavours. The brand is divided into five product categories: Indomie goreng (fried noodles served without soup), Indomie kuah (with soup), Kuliner Indonesia (Indonesian cuisine), Mi Keriting (premium curly noodle), and Hype Abis (unique spicy flavours). Many of the Indomie flavours were created by Nunuk Nuraini, an employee in the instant noodle division of Indofood.

Indomie noodle soup flavours include variations of Rasa Ayam Bawang (onion chicken flavour), Rasa Ayam Spesial (special chicken flavour), Rasa Kaldu Ayam (chicken broth flavour), Rasa Kaldu Udang (shrimp broth flavour), Rasa Kari Ayam (chicken curry flavour), Rasa Soto Mie (Soto mie or vegetable flavour), and Rasa Soto Spesial (Special Soto flavour with Koya powder). There are also Beef and Vegetables (vegetarian) noodle soup flavours in select export markets. In January 2025, new flavours Rasa Soto Koya Nagih (Soto flavour with Koya powder made with prawn crackers) and Rasa Soto Koya Pedas Dower (Soto flavour with spicy Koya powder) were made available in Indonesia.

=== Mi Goreng ===
The back of an Indonesian version of the Indomie Mi Goreng package, showing both the standard preparation method and the microwave preparation method in Indonesian.

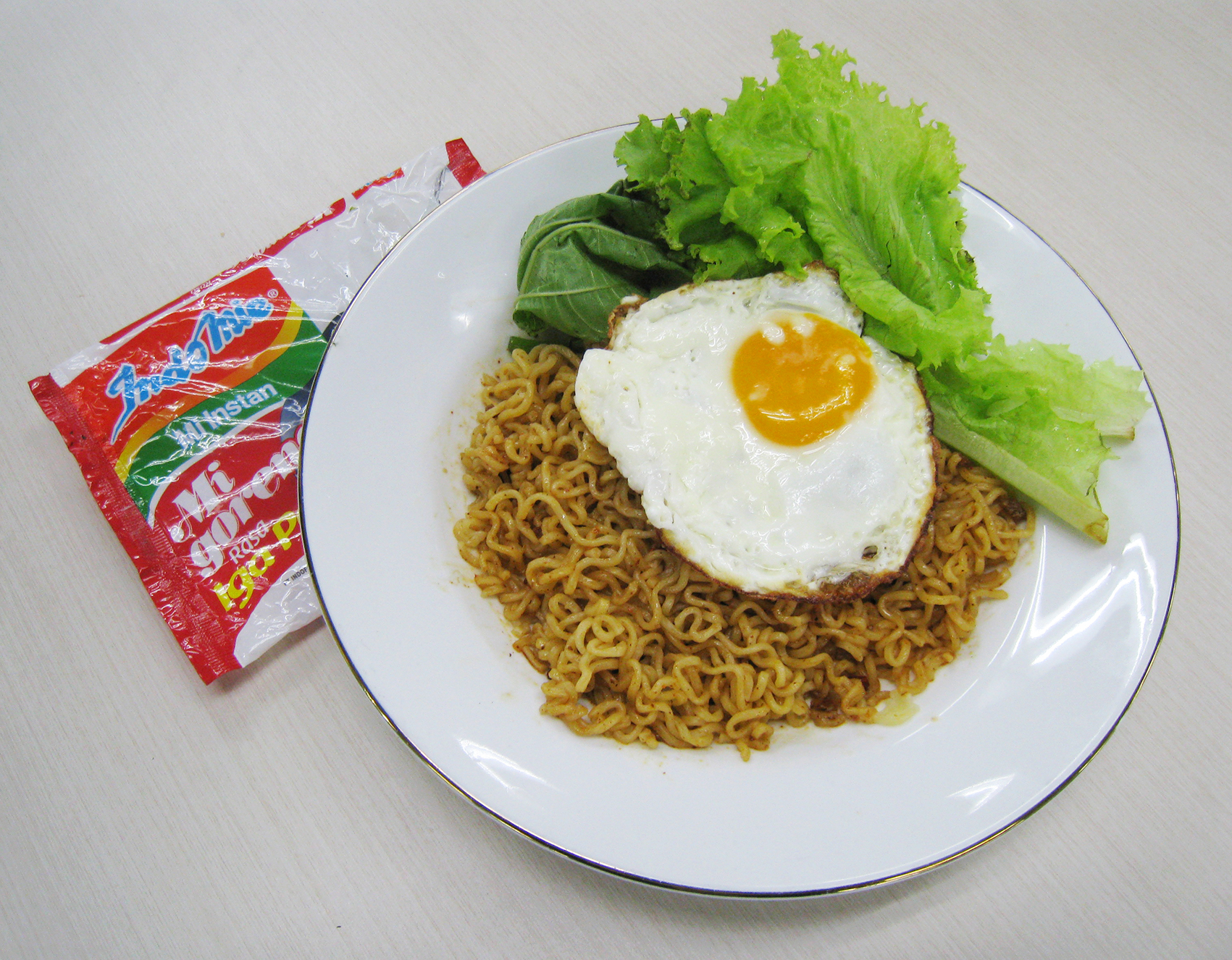
Cooked Indomie Mi Goreng Iga penyet (Indonesian Spicy Beef Ribs) flavour, served with fried egg and vegetables.

The Mi Goreng (stir-fry) line of instant noodles is based on the Indonesian dish mie goreng (fried noodles). It entered the market in 1983 and is distributed in North America, Europe, Africa, Australasia, and various regions in Asia. They are sold in varying weight packets of around 85 grams (3.0 oz) and contain two sachets of flavourings. One containing sweet soy sauce, chilli sauce, and seasoning oil; and the other containing dry seasoning powder and fried shallot flakes. In some regions, Mi Goreng is also available in Jumbo (large) packs, a larger variant with a net weight of 127–129 g (4.5–4.6 oz).

The line is available in Mi Goreng (original fried noodles, also available with fried onion and chilli sauce in Java and Bali islands of Indonesia, as well as in Australia, Canada, and the United States), Mi Goreng Pedas (spicy fried noodle with fried onion), Mi Goreng Rasa Ayam Panggang (barbecue chicken flavoured fried noodle, available with fried onion in export markets), and Mi Goreng Rasa Sate (Satay flavour fried noodles with fried onion; currently only available in Taiwan and Australia). The first three flavours are also available in cup noodle variants in export markets. There is also Mi Goreng Rasa Cabe Ijo or Mi Goreng Perisa Cili Hijau (green chili flavour fried noodle; only available in Indonesia, Malaysia, Saudi Arabia, and Taiwan), Mi Goreng Rasa Iga Penyet (spicy beef ribs flavour fried noodle; available in Indonesia, Vietnam, and export markets), Mi Goreng Rasa Soto (Soto flavour fried noodle, currently available in Malaysia), Mi Goreng Rasa Sambal Matah (Balinese Sambal flavour fried noodle; has since been discontinued), Mi Goreng Rasa Sambal Rica-Rica (Minahasan Sambal flavour fried noodle), and Mi Goreng Kriuuk Pedas (fried noodle with spicy crunchy fried onion). The latter three are only available in Indonesia. The Jumbo variant is only available in Mi Goreng (original fried noodles with fried onion), Mi Goreng Rasa Ayam Panggang (barbeque chicken flavour fried noodles with dried vegetable garnish), Mi Goreng Rasa Rendang (Rendang flavour fried noodles with Krendangz fried topping), and Mi Goreng Rasa Cabe Ijo (green chili flavour fried noodles).

=== Other variants ===
Indomie Kuliner Indonesia refers to Indonesian traditional cuisine variants, such as Mie Aceh (Acehnese fried noodle with fried onion), which reflects the historical culinary influences associated with Aceh's position on maritime trade routes linking the Indonesian archipelago with South Asia and the wider Indian Ocean region, Mi Goreng Rasa Cakalang (skipjack tuna flavour fried noodle), Mi Goreng Rasa Rendang (spicy beef flavour fried noodle), Rasa Coto Makassar (Makassarese Soto flavour), Rasa Empal Gentong (Cirebonese clay pot beef soup flavour), Rasa Mie Celor (spicy coconut shrimp noodle soup flavour), Rasa Mie kocok Bandung (Bandung beef noodle soup flavour), Rasa Rawon Pedas Mercon (East Java spicy beef soup flavour), Rasa Soto Banjar (Banjar Soto flavour), Rasa Soto Banjar Limau Kuit (Banjar Soto with kaffir lime flavour), Rasa Soto Lamongan (Lamongan Soto flavour), and Rasa Soto Medan (Medanese Soto flavour).

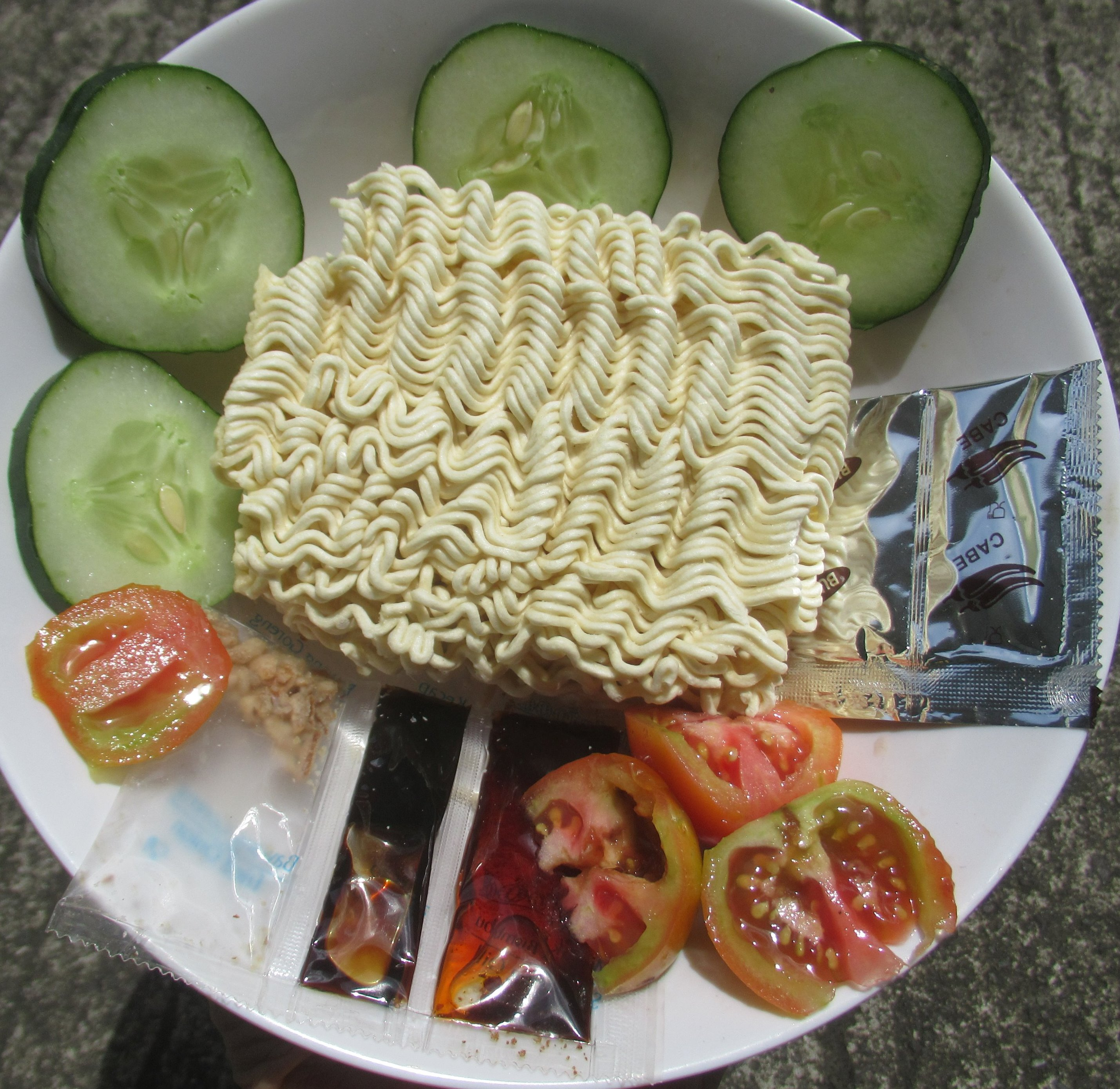
The contents of Indomie pancit canton (the vegetables are not part of the packaging)

Mi Keriting (curly noodle) is the premium variant with additional toppings. It is available in Rasa Ayam Panggang (grilled chicken flavour with separate soup) and Goreng Spesial (special fried curly noodle). The Salted Egg flavour fried curly noodles was also available from 2018 until 2021. There were also Real Meat fried curly noodles variants with real chicken meat, available in Mushroom Chicken and Pepper Chicken flavours from 2019 until 2022, with the former flavour were available from 2016.

The Hype Abis series are variants with unique spicy flavours that were introduced in the late 2010s, and are only available in Indonesia. Variants include Mi Goreng Rasa Ayam Geprek (spicy crushed fried chicken flavour fried noodle, introduced in early 2019), Rasa Seblak Hot Jeletot (Sundanese spicy soup flavour, introduced in early 2020),, Mi Nyemek Ala Banglahdes'e Rasa Kari (Bangladeshi noodles with curry flavour, introduced in June 2025), and Mi Nyemek Ala Jogja Rasa Rendang (Jogja noodles with rendang flavour, introduced in December 2025). There was also Mi Goreng Chitato Rasa Sapi Panggang (fried noodle with Chitato beef barbecue flavour), a limited edition flavour in collaboration with Chitato potato chips brand to celebrate Chitato's 30th anniversary, available from May 2019, Mieghetti Rasa Bolognese (Bolognese sauce flavour spaghetti-style noodle), available from early 2021 until 2022, and Mi Goreng Rasa Kebab Rendang (spicy beef kebab flavour fried noodles), available from September 2022 until 2025.

The Japanese Ramen series, which was introduced in March 2023, is available in Tori Miso flavour soup noodles and Tori Kara (spicy chicken) flavour soup noodles, the latter flavour which was introduced in December 2023. It was previously also available in Shoyu flavour soup noodles and Takoyaki flavour fried noodles (similar to Yakisoba) until 2024.

The Korean Ramyeon series, which was introduced in October 2024, is available in Fiery Chikin (spicy chicken) flavour fried noodles, K-Rosé (rosé sauce) flavour fried noodles, and Spicy Ramyeon (spicy mushroom soup) flavour soup noodles.

The Philippine Indomie Mi Goreng series include fried noodles and pancit canton.

== Pop Mie ==
Pop Mie is an instant cup noodle brand which is a sub-brand of Indomie, first introduced in Indonesia in 1987. The soup variant is available in Rasa Ayam (chicken flavour), Rasa Ayam Bawang (onion chicken flavour) Rasa Baso (meatball flavour), Rasa Kari Ayam (chicken curry flavour), and Rasa Soto Ayam (chicken soto flavour). The Pop Mie Goreng variant is available in Mi Goreng Spesial (special fried noodles) and Mi Goreng Pedas (hot and spicy fried noodles). There is also a spicy variant called Pedas Squad, which is available in Ayam Dower (spicy chicken flavour noodle soup, introduced in 2018), Ayam Gledek (spicy chicken flavour fried noodles, introduced in 2019), Baso Granat (spicy meatball flavour noodle soup), and Kari Lava (spicy curry flavour noodle soup), the latter two flavours were introduced in 2025.

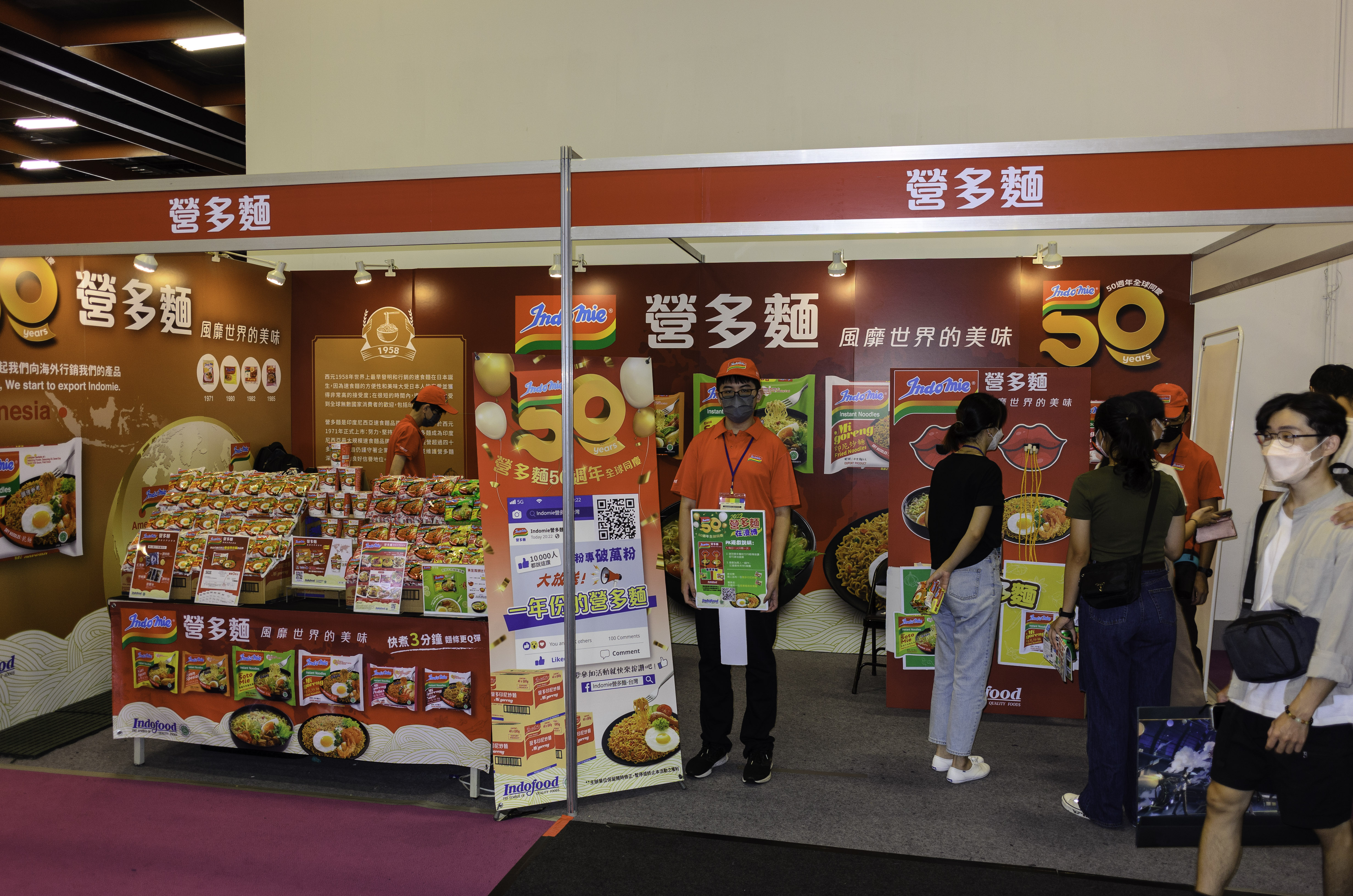
Indomie booth in Taiwan

== Outside Indonesia ==
=== Nigeria ===
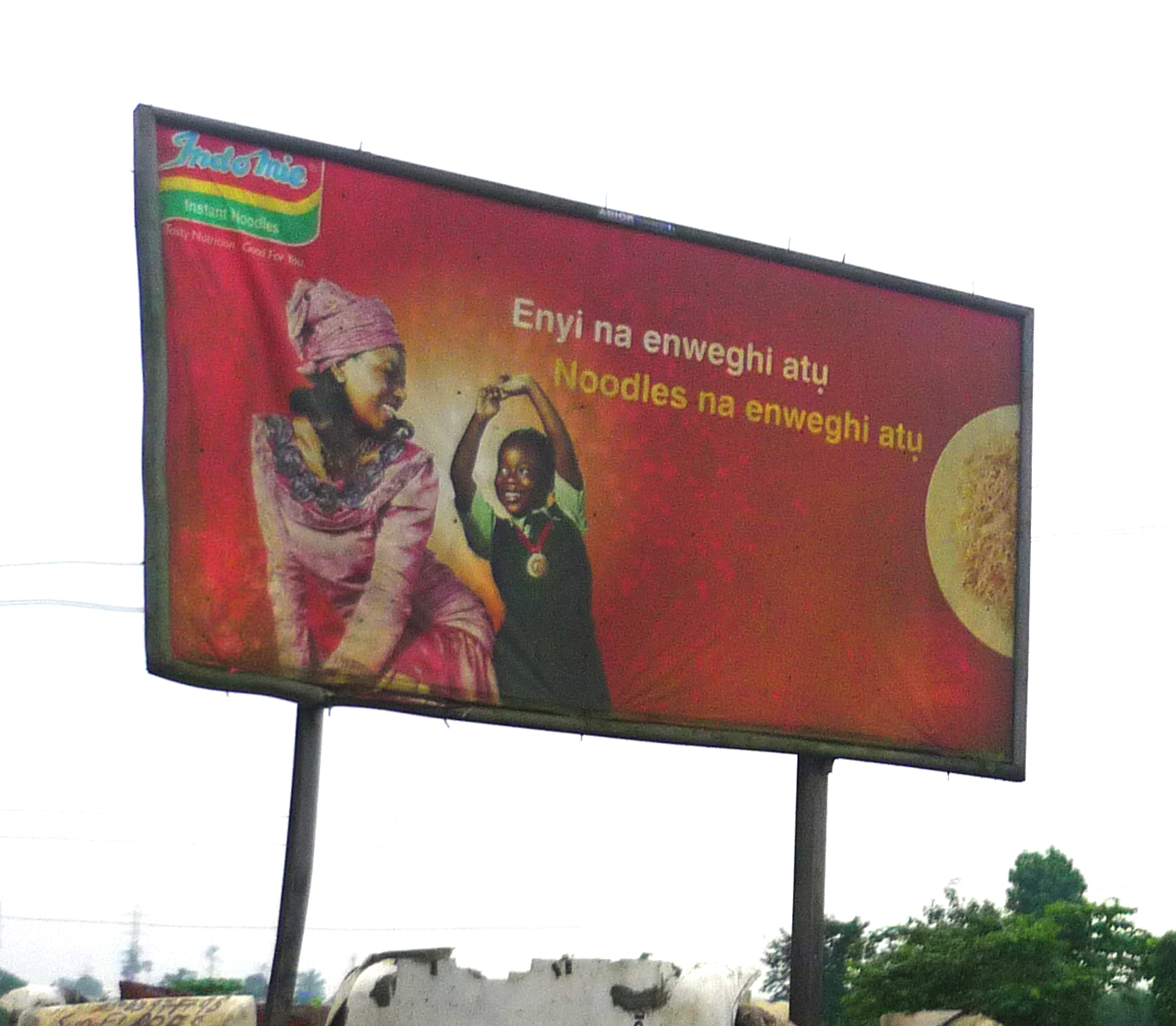
Igbo-language advertisement for Indomie in Nigeria

In Nigeria, Indomie was introduced in the 1980s and is manufactured by Dufil Prima Foods, a joint venture of Indofood and the Singapore-based Tolaram Group. It is available in chicken, onion chicken, chicken pepper soup, and oriental fried noodles flavours. There is also an Indomie relish variant in chicken delight and seafood delight flavours.

Indomie Nigeria hosts a yearly award ceremony aimed at recognising, celebrating, and awarding brave Nigerian children after rigorous search processes.

The popularity of Indomie in Nigeria has led many Nigerians to believe that Indomie is a Nigerian product.

=== Turkey ===
In Turkey, Indomie is available in chicken, vegetables, curry, special, soy sauce, hot and spicy, and veal flavours.

=== Serbia ===
Indomie has been manufactured in Inđija, Serbia since 2016 by IndoAdriatic Industry, a licensed producer of Indomie products, and is the principal manufacturer for the European market. It quickly became popular in the Serbian market.

=== Pakistan ===
Indomie has been manufactured in Pakistan by Pinehill Private Limited, a licensed manufacturer. The company initially imported Indomie products before establishing a production facility in Faisalabad to serve the domestic market. Locally available flavours include Meat Masala, Chicken Chatkhara, Lemon Tarka, and Chicken.

== Bans and recalls ==
In October 2010 the Taiwanese government announced that the Indomie sold there contained two prohibited preservatives, sodium benzoate, and methyl p-hydroxybenzoate, used to make cosmetics. Two leading supermarket chains in Hong Kong also temporarily stopped selling Indomie instant noodles.

In April 2023, Malaysia and Taiwan recalled Indomie's "special chicken" flavour noodles following the detection of ethylene oxide in the product by Malaysian and Taiwanese health institutions.

== See also ==
- List of instant noodle brands
