= Ayam goreng kalasan =

Indonesian traditional fried chicken

Ayam Goreng Kalasan
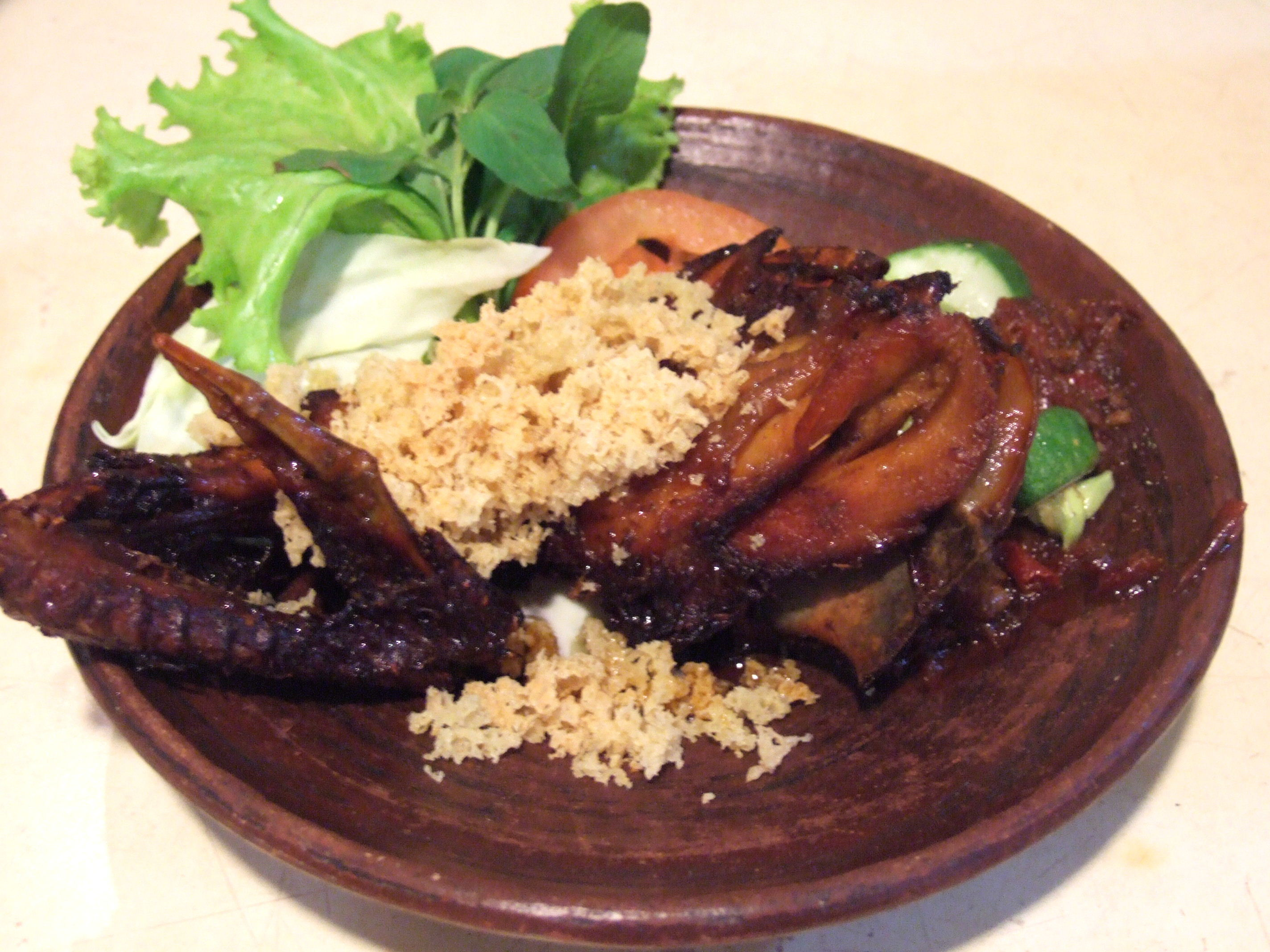
- Course: Main course
- Place of origin: Indonesia
- Region or state: Sleman, Yogyakarta
- Associated cuisine: Indonesian cuisine
- Created by: Mbok Berek
- Serving temperature: Hot
- Main ingredients: Ayam goreng with kremesan

Ayam goreng Kalasan (Javanese: ꦄꦪꦩ꧀ꦒꦺꦴꦫꦺꦁꦏꦭꦱꦤ꧀, romanized: Ayam Gorèng Kalasan) is an Indonesian dish consisting of fried chicken topped with kremesan, crisp bits of fried batter. The dish originates from the area surrounding the Kalasan Temple in Sleman, Yogyakarta, and has since spread nationwide, being considered a popular iteration of the ubiquitous ayam goreng.

== History ==
Ayam goreng Kalasan (lit. Kalasan fried chicken) originates from Yogyakarta's Kalasan area, near the Prambanan Temple. The dish was created by Nini Ronodikromo from the village of Candisari, during the Japanese occupation of Java. Ronodikromo, better known as Mbok Berek, ran a small stall selling ayam goreng and created the dish after learning of a cooking technique taught by an unknown elderly man said to have come from the Baduy of West Java.

The success of the dish cumulated to Mbok Berek's opening of a restaurant specialising in the dish, later visited and further popularised by Indonesian president, Sukarno in the 1950s. Upon the restaurant's bankruptcy and demise in the 1960s, the dish was reproduced and spread by her former staff and patrons, who opened restaurants of their own. Such patrons included Suharti, founder of the Ayam Goreng Suharti chain of restaurants, which initially used Mbok Berek's name before reverting to her own name. Upon the death of Mbok Berek, the recipe was passed down to her descendants, who later opened a restaurant of their own in Jakarta in 1978.

Presently, the Candisari village has become a centre of the dish, with 54 distinct businesses specialising in the dish operating in the area.

== Preparation ==
The dish is traditionally prepared with the ayam kampung chicken, native to Indonesia. Apart from the cooked chicken, the dish is most commonly served with rice and is paired with a sambal and a vegetable lalab, typically consisting of cucumbers, basil leaves, and cabbage. It is typically prepared with young chickens seasoned with a spice mix that includes salt, shallots, garlic, coriander, galangal, bay leaves, among other ingredients and boiled in coconut milk. The resulting dish is topped with its distinctive kremesan, a crisp, fried batter made of starch flour, chicken stock, and eggs.

== See also ==
- Ayam goreng
- Ayam penyet
- Javanese cuisine
- Indonesian cuisine
