= Nunuk Nuraini =

Food scientist who invented Indomie brand mi goreng flavour instant noodles

- Born: 1961; Bandung, Indonesia
- Died: 27 January 2021 (aged 59–60); Jakarta, Indonesia
- Employer: Indofood
- Known for: Indomie mi goreng instant noodles

Nunuk Nuraini (1961 – 27 January 2021), also known as Bu Nunuk ("Mrs. Nunuk"), was an Indonesian food scientist who invented Indomie's mi goreng-flavour instant noodles.

West Java governor Ridwan Kamil called her "pahlawan bagi anak-anak kos" (hero for the boarding house kids). The mi goreng flavour is described as a "cult favourite". The noodles are popular around the world, so much so that starting in 1995 the company had built three factories in Nigeria alone.

Nuraini was born in Bandung, Indonesia. She graduated from Padjadjaran University in that city with a degree in food technology. Nuraini was an adherent of Islam. She worked for Indofood as the flavour department manager, developing recipes there for almost three decades. She developed the popular mi goreng flavour in 1982, which was the first "dry" flavour sold without broth. Nuraini originated the flavour with traditional ingredients. Other flavours she invented include chicken curry, green chilli, rendang, salted egg, sambal matah, and soto. Despite having many fans, Nuraini rarely appeared in public.

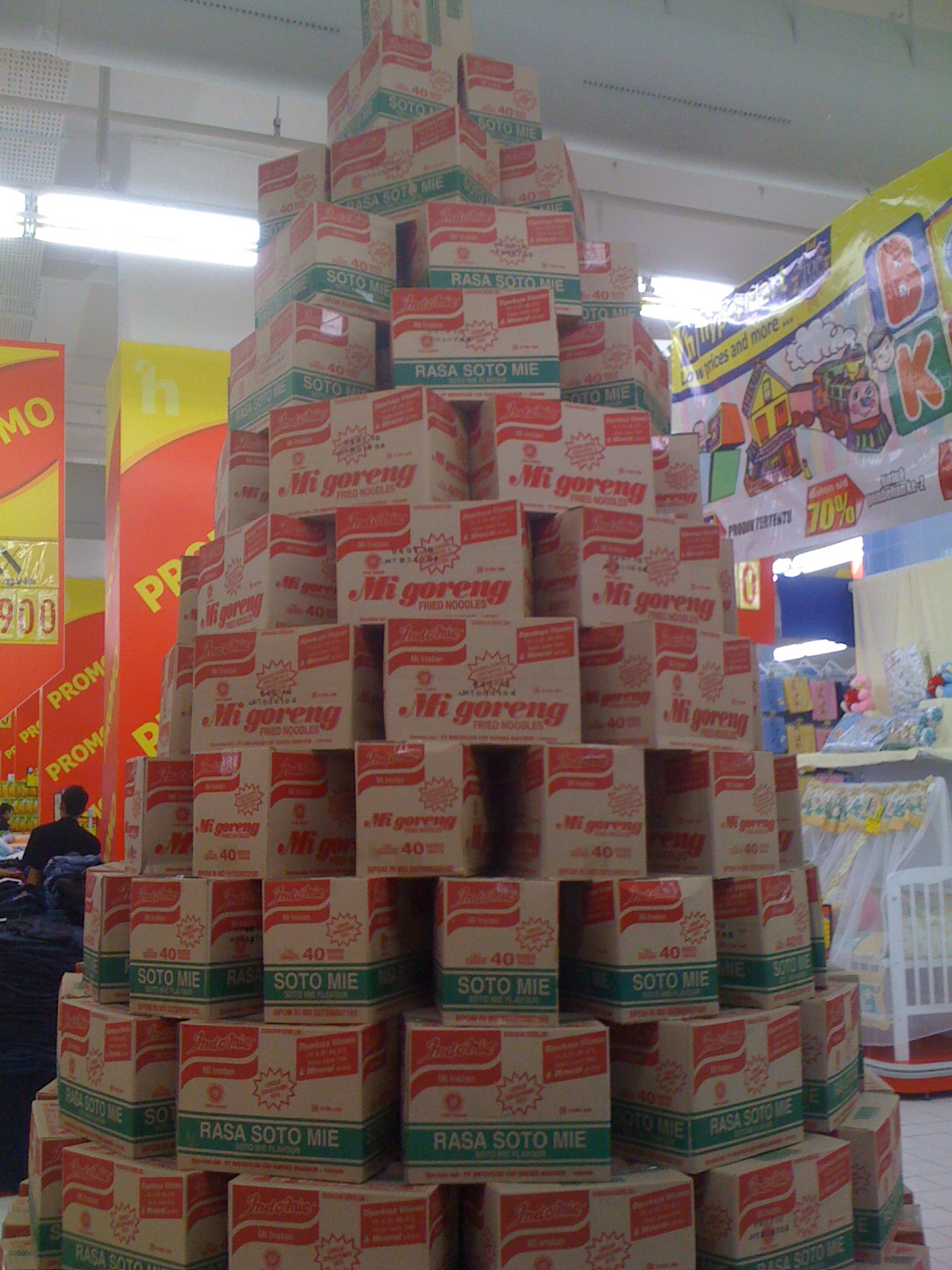
Cases of Indomie instant noodles

Her death was confirmed by Indofood's head of public relations, Nurlita Novi Arlaida, who wrote: "Ibu Hj Nunuk Nuraini wafat hari ini dan pulang dengan tenang ke pangkuan Allah SWT" (Mrs. Hajjah Nunuk Nuraini has died today and is returning peacefully to God's side). Early on, the cause of Nuraini's death was not specified. But the Padjadjaran University alumni later stated her death was caused by a heart disease, not COVID-19, as was earlier rumoured. Following her death, numerous tributes to Nuraini were posted on social media, thanking her for her work and expressing pride for it being a product of Indonesia.
