= Iga penyet =

Indonesian fried beef spare ribs dish

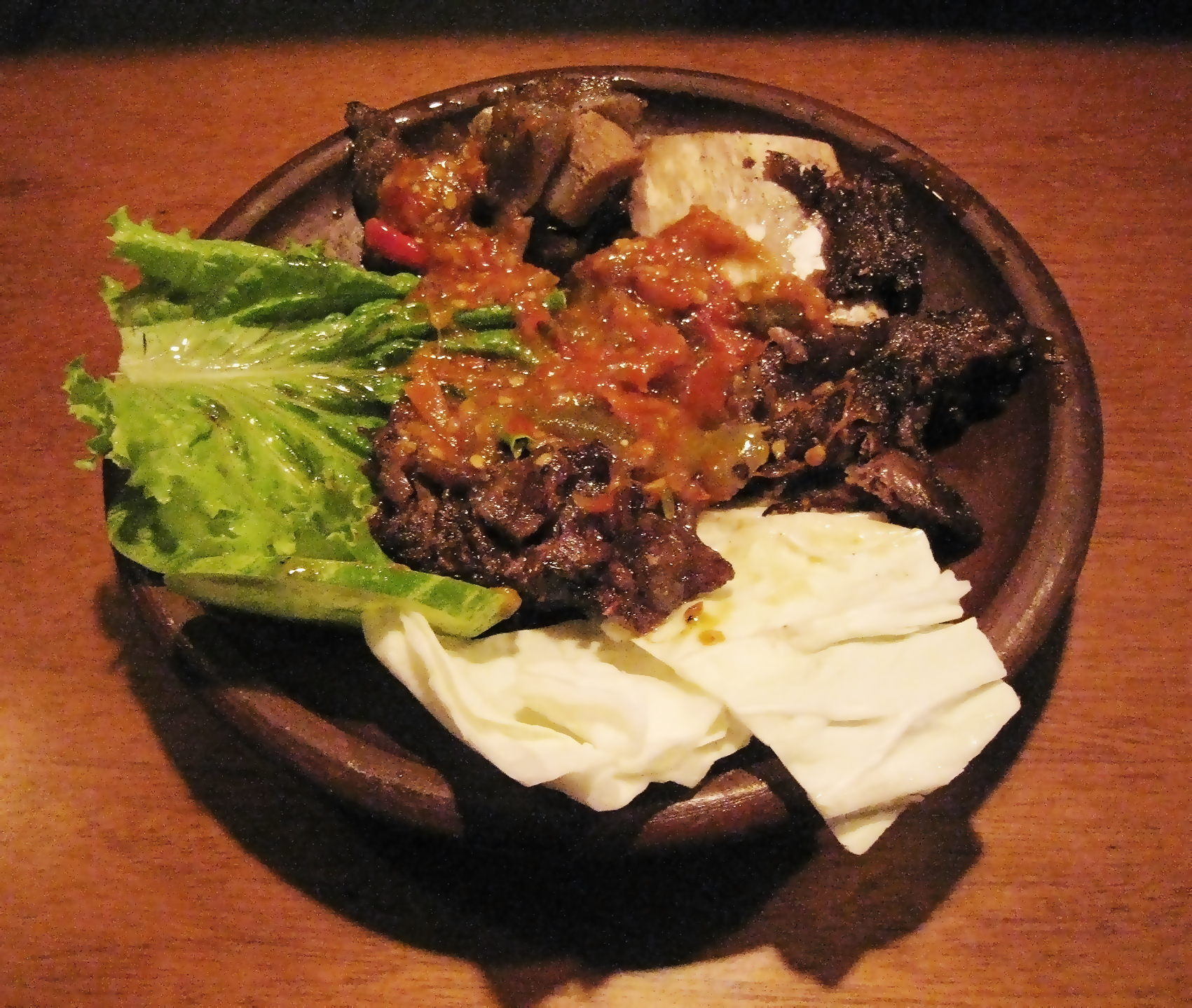
- Iga penyet, "squeezed" beef spare ribs in sambal
- Course: Main course
- Place of origin: Indonesia
- Region or state: Surabaya, East Java
- Serving temperature: Hot
- Main ingredients: "Squeezed" beef ribs served with sambal

Iga penyet (English: squeezed ribs) is a Javanese dish of fried beef spare ribs served with spicy sambal terasi. The fried beef ribs are squeezed against a mortar filled with sambal, and usually served with lalab (raw vegetables) and steamed rice. Iga penyet first became popular in the eastern Javanese city of Surabaya, and has since spread across Indonesia.

== Etymology ==
In Indonesian iga means ribs, while the term penyet in Javanese means "to squeeze", which refer to the serving method of squeezing the meat against mortar filled with spicy sambal. This penyet method of food preparation is also applied to a number of other dishes, such as empal, ayam penyet, ayam goreng penyet, and ayam bakar penyet.

== See also ==
- Javanese cuisine
