= Geprek Bensu =

Indonesian fast food restaurant

- Type: Fast food chain
- Founded: 17 April 2017
- Founder: Ruben Onsu
- Headquarters: Kemang, South Jakarta, Indonesia
- Number of locations: 110 franchisees (Indonesia)
- Products: Ayam geprek
- Number of employees: 3,500 (Indonesian employees, 2018)
- Parent: PT Onsu Pangan Perkasa

Geprek Bensu is an Indonesian fast food restaurant chain primarily serving ayam geprek. As of December 2018, the chain had 110 franchises in Indonesia, employing an estimated 3,500 people. The chain also operates in Hong Kong and Malaysia, and plans to expand to Taiwan and the Netherlands.

The chain is owned by Indonesian actor Ruben Onsu, in his capacity as chief executive officer of PT Onsu Pangan Perkasa (OPP) founded on 17 April 2017.

== Branding disputes ==
The chain has been involved in trademark disputes against eateries with the same name. Onsu filed lawsuits against the following people, but in each case his claim was dismissed by the court due to mala fide intent.

- Jessy Handalim, owner of Bensu (short for Bengkel Susu; the Milk Workshop in English).
- Benny Sujono, owner of I Am Geprek Bensu (a portmanteau of his own name). It has been alleged that Onsu planted a subordinate in an I Am Geprek Bensu location to obtain their chain's recipe.

Detik.com reported in June 2020 that the chain's logo is based on a free vector image.
