= Ayam penyet =

Indonesian traditional fried chicken

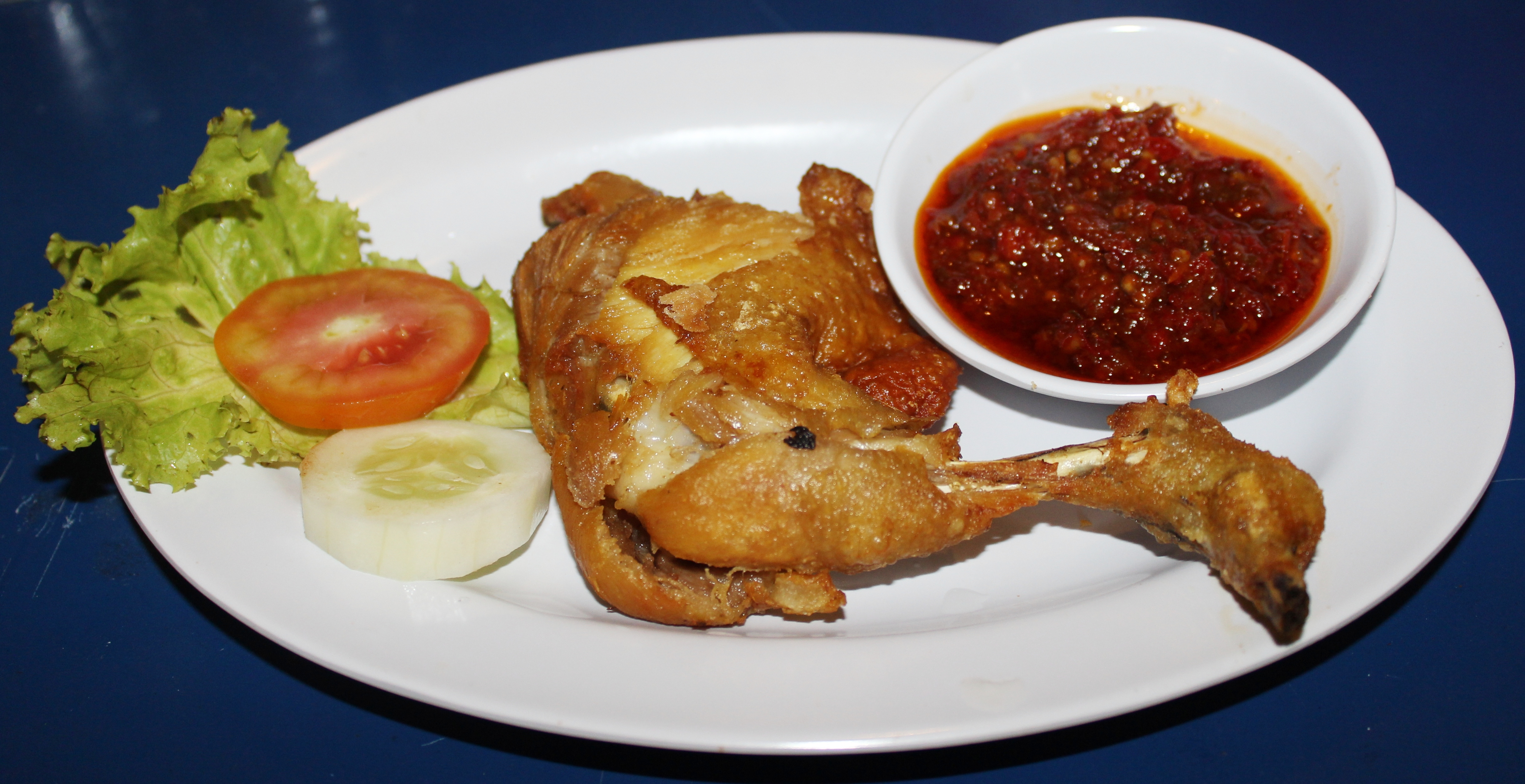
- A plate of ayam penyet, "squeezed" fried chicken in sambal
- Course: Main course
- Place of origin: Indonesia
- Region or state: East Java
- Associated cuisine: Indonesia
- Serving temperature: Hot
- Main ingredients: "Squeezed" or "smashed" fried chicken served with sambal

Ayam penyet (Javanese for squeezed fried chicken) is an Indonesian — more precisely East Javanese cuisine — fried chicken dish consisting of fried chicken that is squeezed with the pestle against the mortar to make it softer, and is served with sambal, slices of cucumbers, fried tofu, and tempeh (mostly cucumber). In Indonesia, penyet dishes such as fried chicken and ribs are commonly associated with Surabaya, the capital city of East Java. The most popular ayam penyet variant is ayam penyet Suroboyo.

Ayam penyet is known for its spicy sambal, which is made with a mixture of chilli, anchovies, tomatoes, shallots, garlic, shrimp paste, tamarind and lime juice. Like its namesake, the sambal mixture is then smashed into a paste to be eaten with the dish.

Today ayam penyet is commonly found in Indonesia, Malaysia, Brunei and Singapore. It has recently surged in popularity across Southeast Asia, where various chains of franchises have opened selling the dish along with other Indonesian delicacies.

== Name ==
Penyet is a Javanese term for "squeezed" or "pressed," thus ayam penyet means "squeezed chicken." It is quite similar to another popular Indonesian fried chicken dish, ayam geprek, as both are fried chicken smashed and mixed together with hot and spicy sambal chili paste. The difference is ayam penyet is a traditional Javanese ayam goreng half-cooked in bumbu kuning (yellow spice paste) and then deep fried in hot palm oil. Ayam geprek however, is more akin to western-style (American) fried chicken, which is crispy fried chicken coated with batter, or known in Indonesia as ayam goreng tepung (battered fried chicken).

== History ==
The history of Ayam Penyet was originally from Ayam bakar Wong Solo, this menu is present as a variation of the menu at Ayam Bakar Wong Solo. But it became more and more famous when Surabaya people sold this under the name Ayam Penyet Surabaya.

== Gallery ==
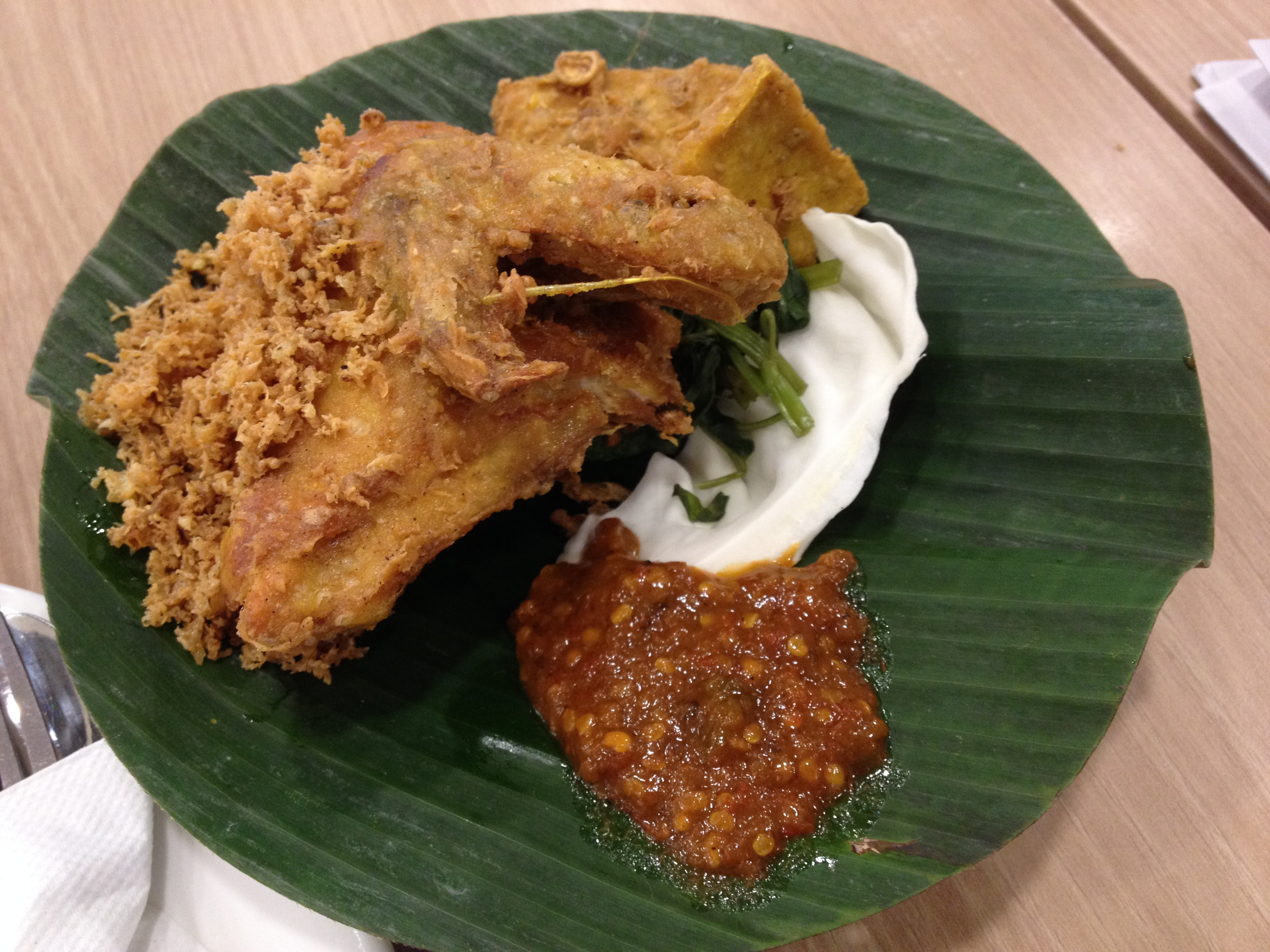

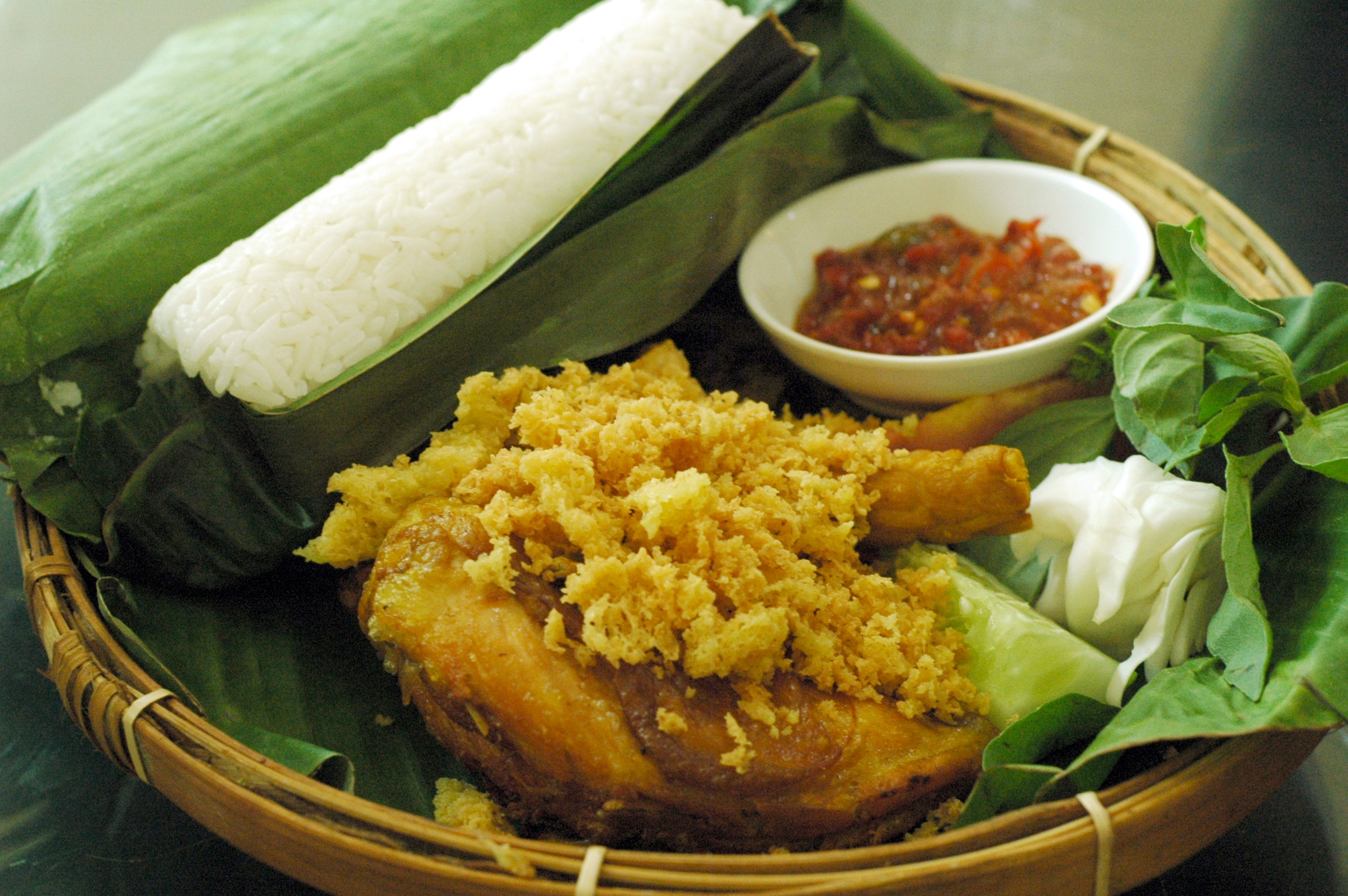

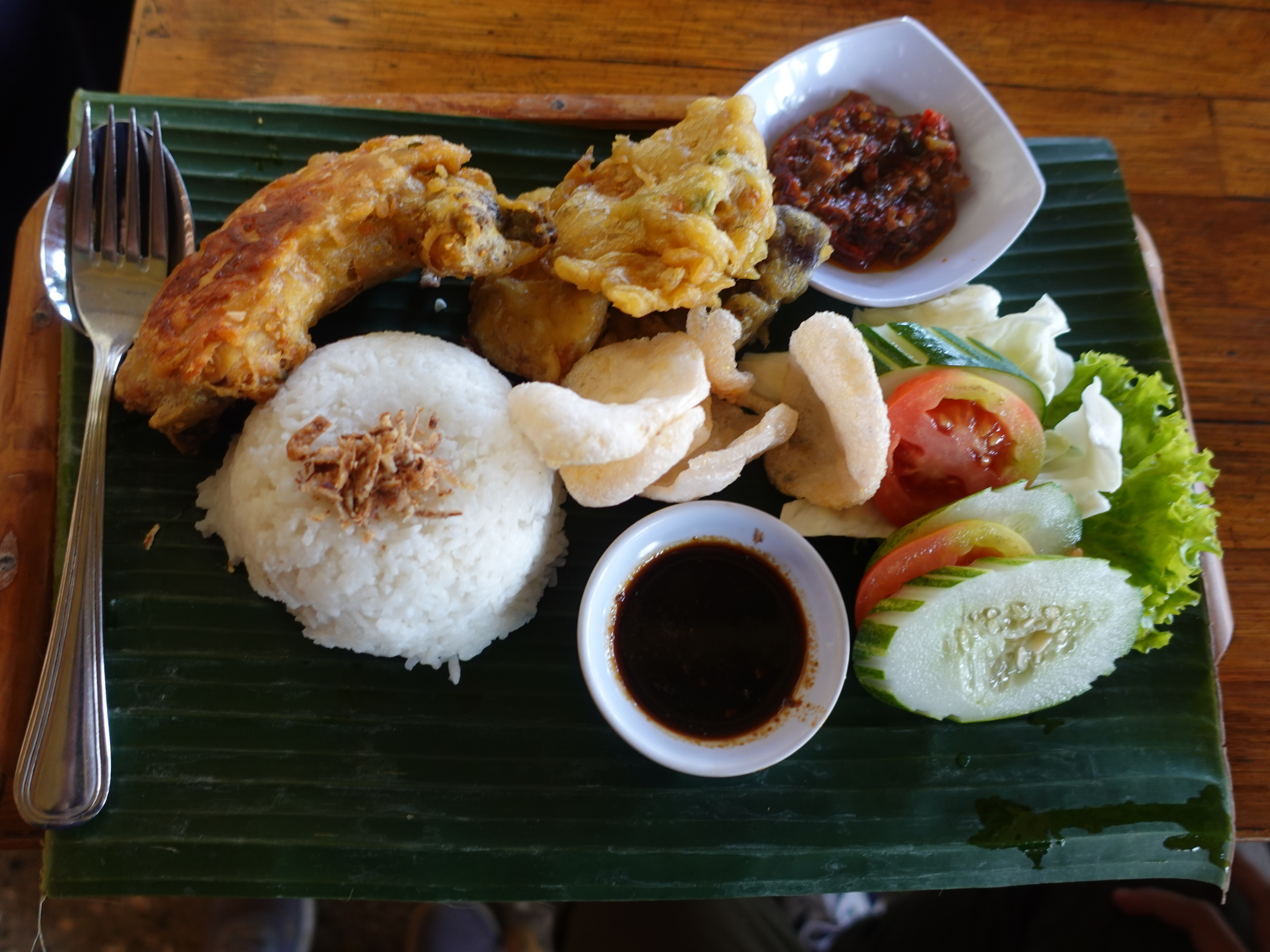

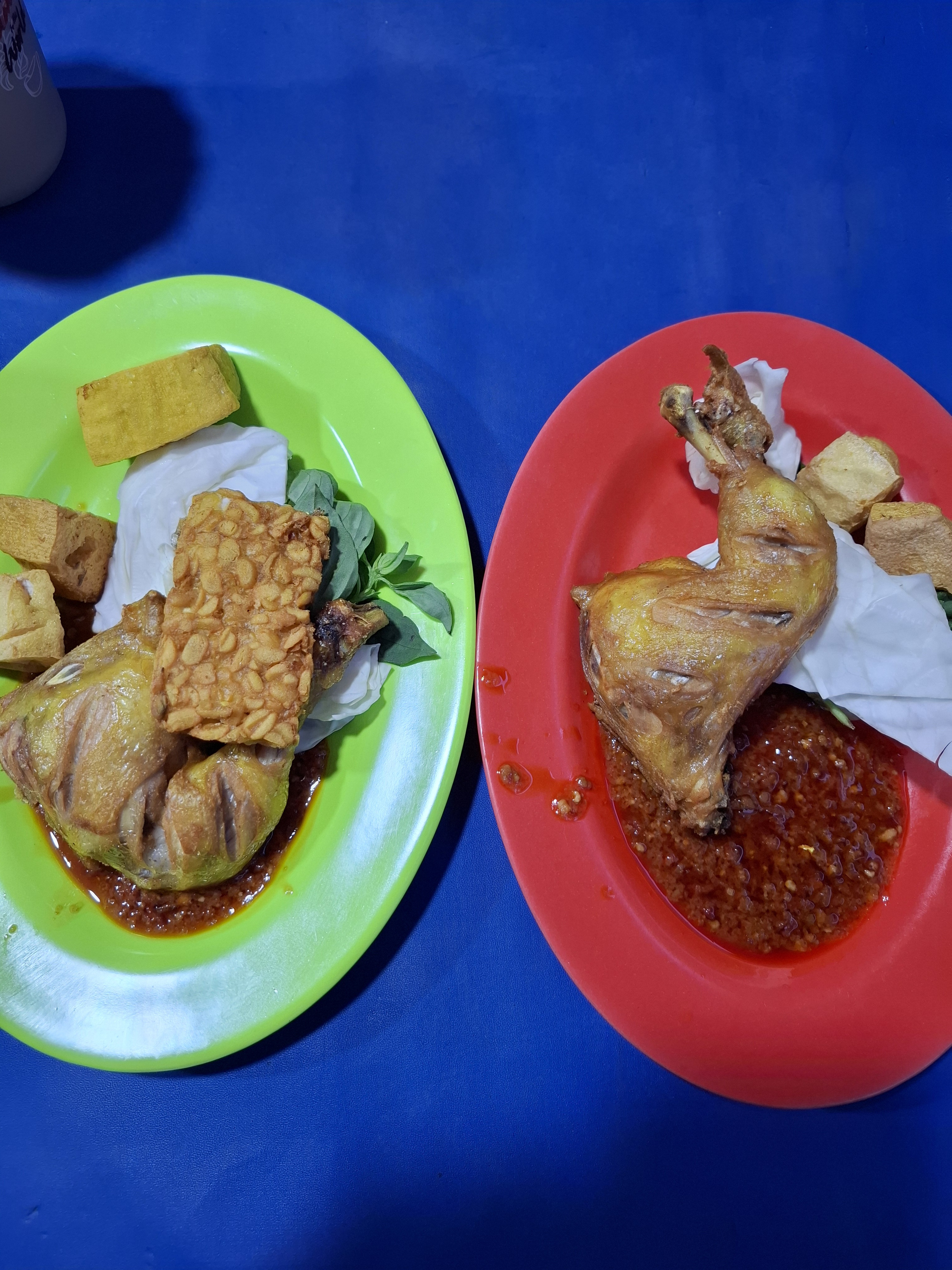

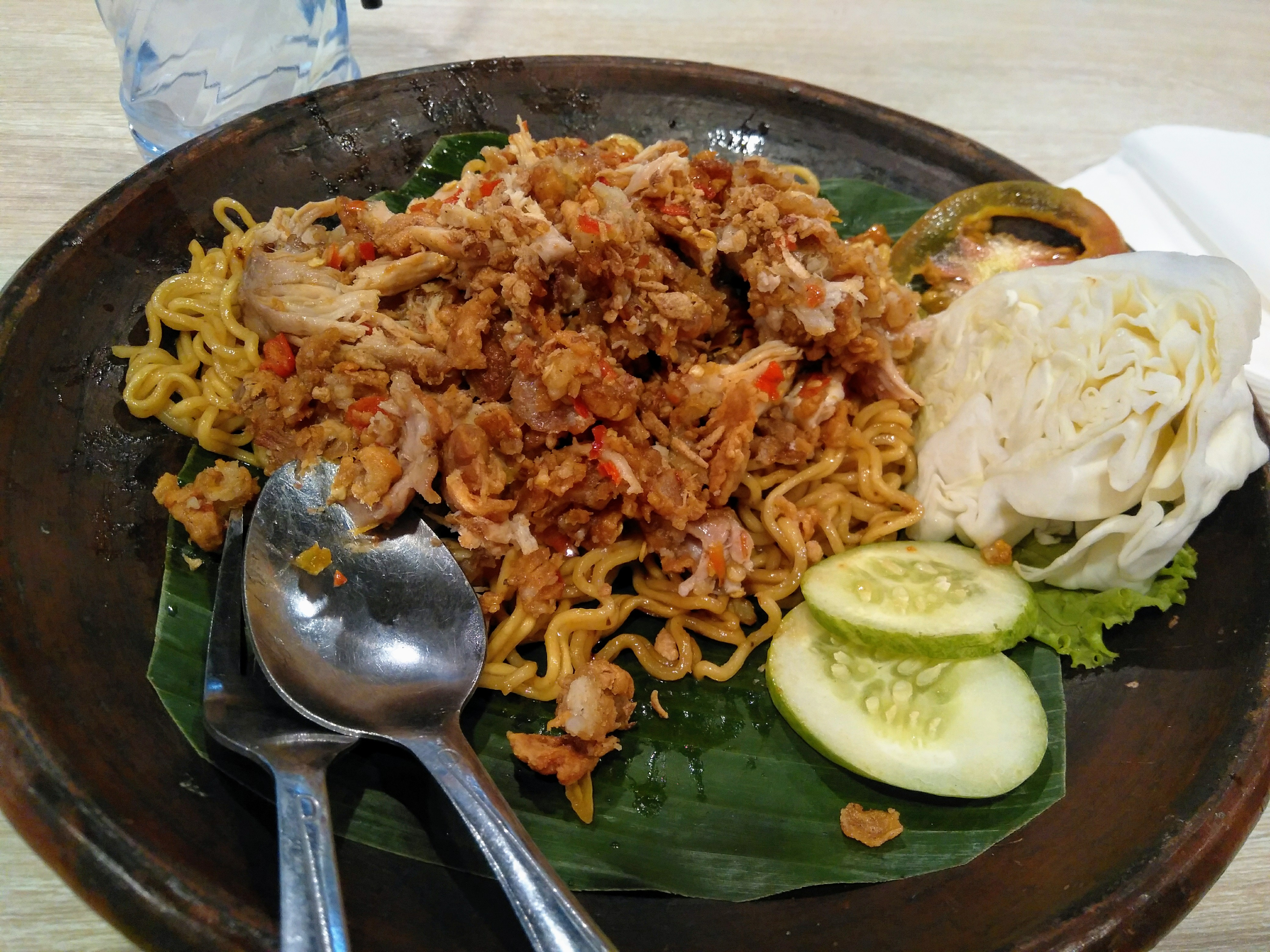
With Indomie

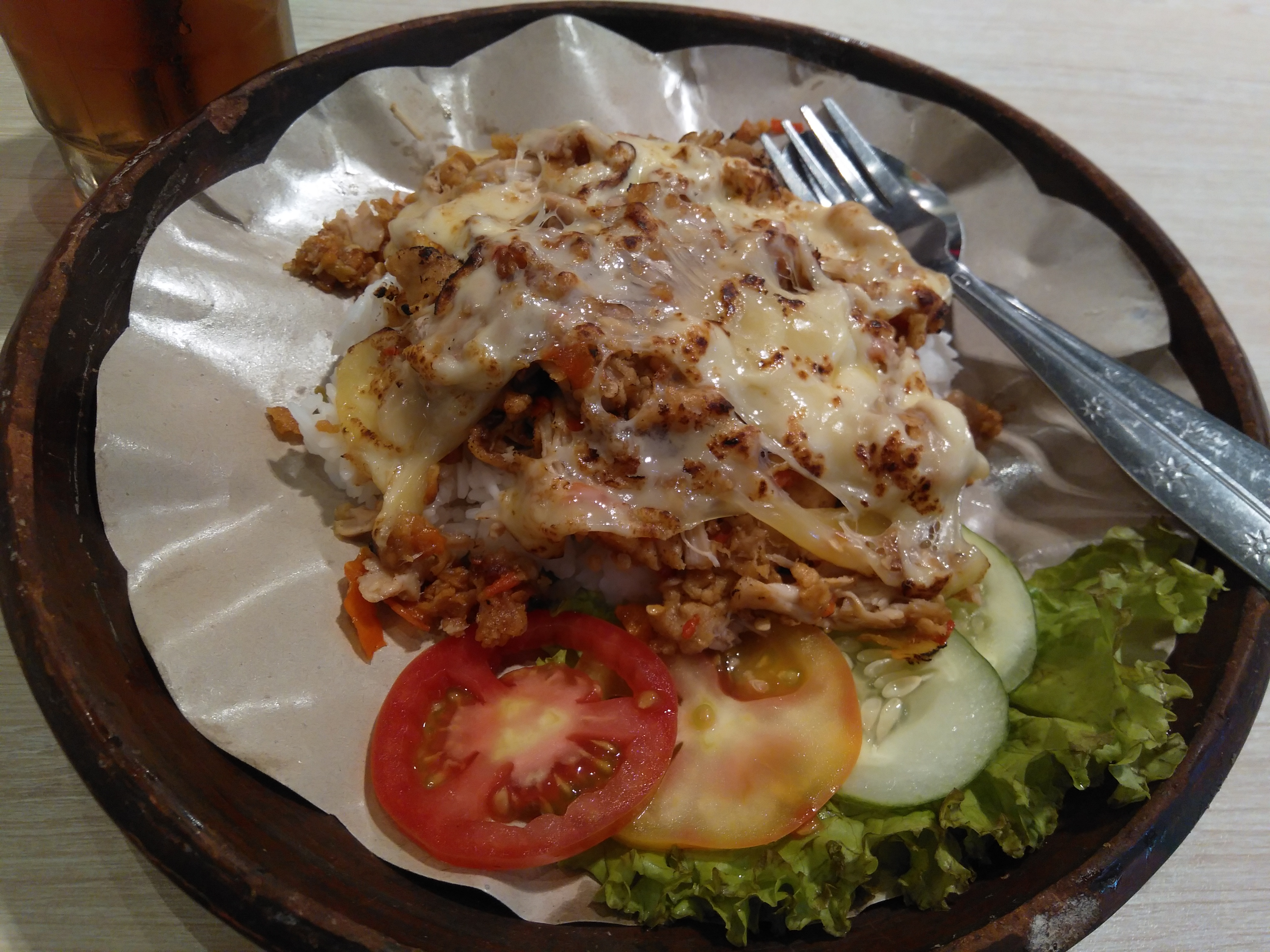
With mozzarella cheese

== See also ==
- Iga penyet
- Ayam geprek
