= Ayam geprek =

Indonesian fried chicken dish

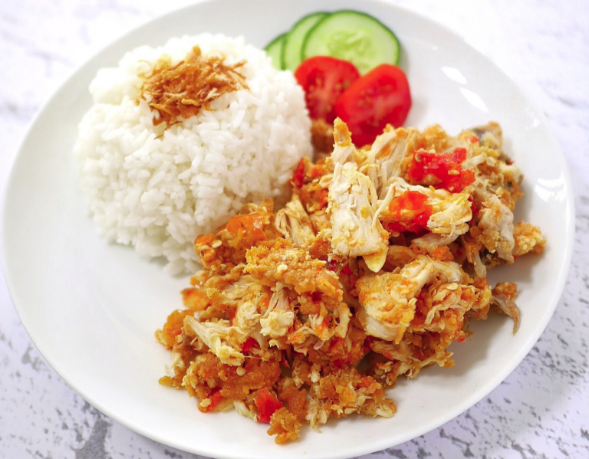
- A plate of ayam geprek, fried chicken in sambal served with steamed rice
- Course: Main course
- Place of origin: Indonesia
- Region or state: Yogyakarta
- Associated cuisine: Indonesia (Javanese)
- Created by: Ruminah from Yogyakarta
- Invented: 2003
- Serving temperature: Hot
- Main ingredients: fried chicken served with sambal

Ayam geprek (Javanese: ꦥꦶꦠꦶꦏ꧀ꦒꦼꦥꦿꦺꦏ꧀, romanized: pitik geprèk, lit. 'crushed chicken') is Indonesian crispy battered fried chicken crushed and mixed with hot and spicy sambal. Currently, ayam geprek is commonly found in Indonesia and neighbouring countries; however, its origin was from Yogyakarta in Java.

Geprek is the Javanese term for "crushed" or "smashed", thus ayam geprek means "crushed chicken". It is quite similar to the traditional East Javanese ayam penyet, as both consist of fried chicken that is smashed and mixed with hot and spicy sambal chili paste. The difference is that ayam penyet is a type of traditional Javanese ayam goreng that is half-cooked in bumbu kuning (yellow spice paste) before being deep-fried in hot palm oil, while ayam geprek is more akin to Western-style (American) fried chicken that is coated with batter and popularly known as ayam goreng tepung (battered fried chicken) in Indonesia.

== Origin ==
Ayam geprek gained popularity across Indonesia in 2017, with a number of outlets sprouting in most Indonesian cities. Its origin, however, was believed to be from Yogyakarta, from the creation of Mrs. Ruminah, or popularly known as Bu Rum. In 2003, Bu Rum's customers requested that her ayam goreng tepung (battered fried chicken) be smashed and topped with sambal chilli paste. Subsequently, this smashed spicy crispy fried chicken has gained wider popularity, as a number of restaurants copied the recipe.

Another source argued that the current popularity of ayam geprek was initiated by local fast food chain Quick Chicken, which launched their product called "American Penyet" in 2013. Bedi Zubaedi, founder and CEO of Quick Chicken, claimed that before the ayam geprek was as popular, they had made an identical dish named "American Penyet". This menu is a blend of Western-style fried chicken served in the Indonesian penyet method mixed with sambal bajak.

In 2018, Grab Holdings announced that 13 million orders of ayam geprek were made through the food delivery app, citing convenience, speed, and taste as key factors for the dish's popularity.

== Variants ==
Ayam geprek is commonly served with sambal chilli paste; however, today its new variants might be served with additional toppings such as mozzarella cheese and kol goreng (fried cabbage). A variant of the dish, ayam geprek sambal ijo (hijau in standardized Indonesian), incorporates green bird's eye chilli in the sambal.

Different poultry birds may be used in place of chicken while maintaining the geprek style. Common variants use pigeon meat (burung dara geprek), duck (bebek geprek), and quail (burung puyuh geprek). These variants are especially popular during the Ramadan fast.

Other non-poultry meats may also be incorporated in the geprek style. Such variants include beef in the form of breaded beefsteak (daging sapi geprek) and seafood like shrimp (udang geprek), squid (cumi geprek) and Clarias catfish (lele geprek). Non-halal (i.e. haram) variants using pork (babi geprek) have also been documented in areas with significant Chinese-Indonesian populations such as Jakarta, Semarang, and Surakarta, alongside provinces with a higher non-Muslim population like Bali.

Vegetarian variants using geprek are also well-documented, namely variants using oyster mushrooms (jamur geprek), tofu (tahu geprek), tempeh (tempe geprek), eggplant (terong geprek), and Amaranth (bayam geprek). These vegetarian variants of geprek, unlike the aforementioned meat variants, are generally treated as a snack or side dish instead of the main protein. Tempe geprek is the favorite food of Sri Mulyani, the former International Monetary Fund executive director and Indonesian Minister of Finance.

=== Jamur geprek ===
Jamur geprek is a vegetarian variant of ayam geprek made using oyster mushrooms which are fried until crispy. It has garnered social media popularity, particularly among university students and consequently small businesses as a street food. However, unlike the other meat-based variants which are treated as a main protein with rice, jamur geprek is generally considered a light snack.

In 2018, Grab Holdings listed jamur geprek as one of its app's two most popular delivery snack orders alongside honey-flavored pisang goreng, with the former peaking in order frequency during events like the World Cup, Asian Games, and Eid al-Fitr.

== Commercialisation ==
- Geprek Bensu is a fast food chain revolving around ayam geprek, with locations in Indonesia, Hong Kong, and Malaysia.

== See also ==
- Fried chicken
- Ayam goreng
- Ayam penyet
