= Ayam goreng =

Indonesian and Malay fried chicken dish

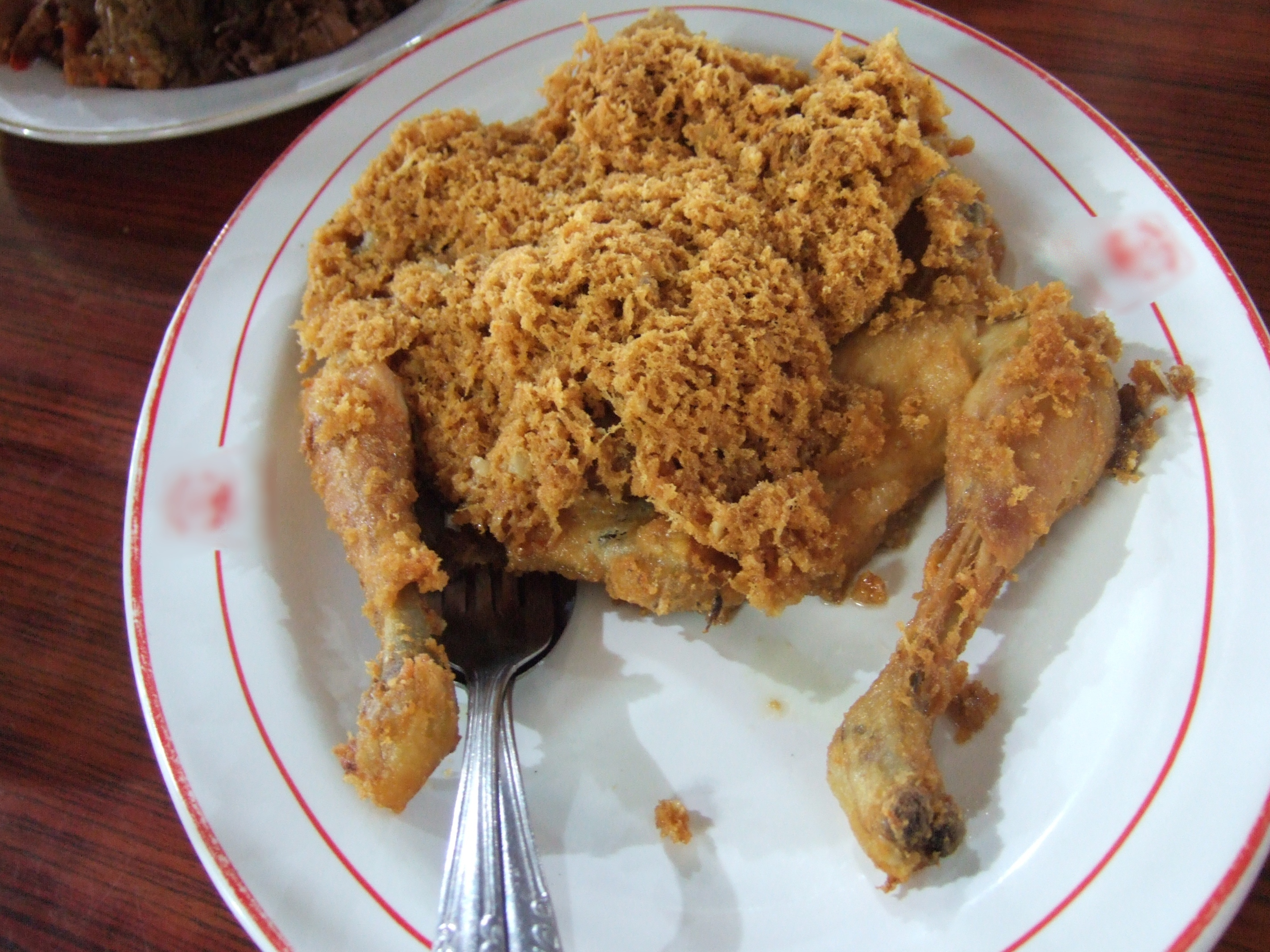
- Ayam goreng kalasan, served with kremes crispy granules
- Course: Main course
- Associated cuisine: Indonesia, Brunei, Malaysia, Singapore
- Serving temperature: Hot
- Main ingredients: Chicken, turmeric, garlic, shallots and other spices deep fried in coconut oil

Ayam goreng is an Indonesian and Malay dish consisting of deep-fried chicken in oil. Ayam goreng literally means "fried chicken" in Indonesian, Malay, and also in many Indonesian regional languages (e.g. Javanese). Unlike other countries, Indonesian fried chicken usually uses turmeric and garlic as its main ingredients rather than flour.

In 2024, TasteAtlas ranked ayam goreng as one of the best fried chicken dishes and the best traditional chicken dishes in the world.

== Marination and spices ==
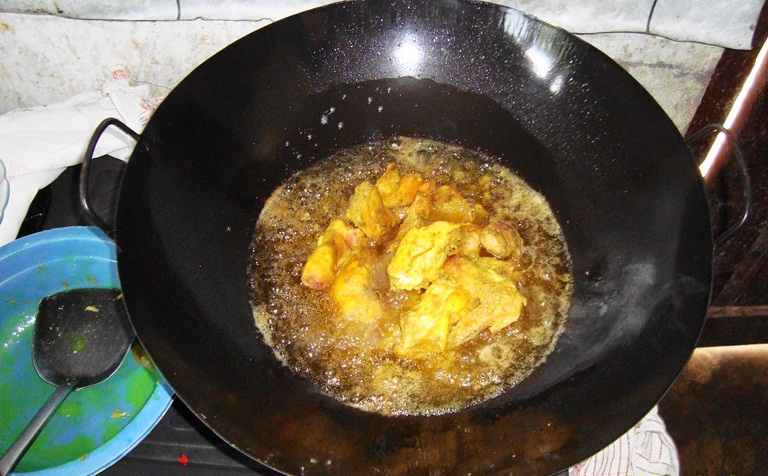
Frying ayam goreng

Some versions of ayam goreng coat chicken in neither batter or flour, but instead seasoned richly with various spices. The spice mixture varies by regions, but usually consists of a combination of ground shallot, garlic, Indian bay leaves, turmeric, lemongrass, tamarind juice, candlenut, galangal, salt, and sugar. The chicken pieces are marinated in the spice mixture prior to frying, sometimes heating the chicken in ground spices. Most often prior to deep frying, ayam goreng is already half-cooked with yellowish colour tinted of turmeric. In Javanese, this process is called ungkep.

The chicken is then deep fried in an ample amount of hot cooking oil, either palm or coconut oil. The chicken is fried until golden yellow. Some variants such as Javanese ayam goreng kremes add the deep fried spiced flour as crispy granules. While in other recipes, these granules are acquired from fried grated galangal or coconut (serundeng).

Ayam goreng is usually served with steamed rice, sambal terasi (chili with shrimp paste) or sambal kecap (sliced chilli and shallot in sweet soy sauce) as a dipping sauce or condiment and slices of cucumber and tomato for garnish. Fried tempeh and tofu might be added as side dishes.

== Variants ==
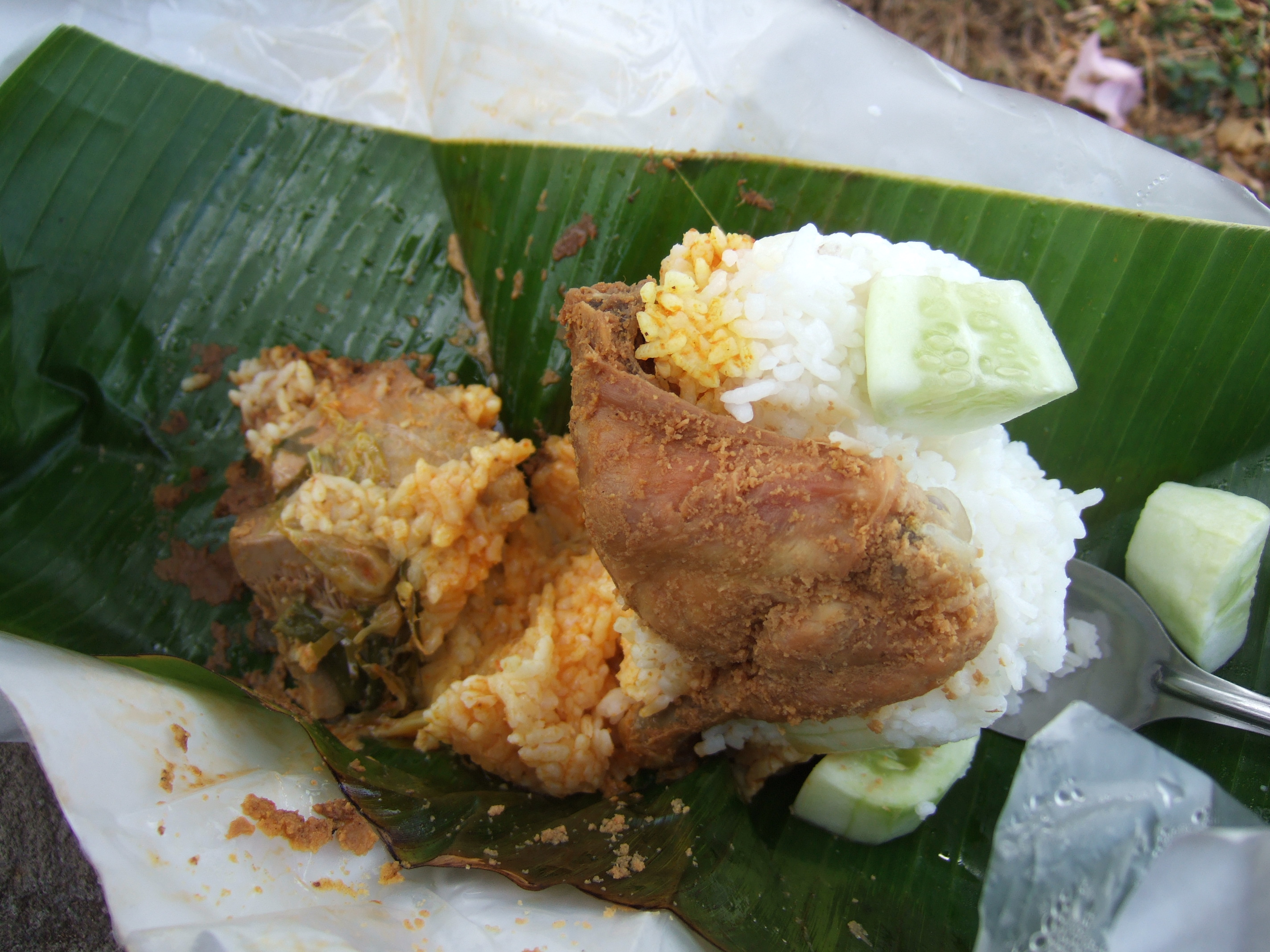
Nasi bungkus Padang with Padang style ayam goreng.

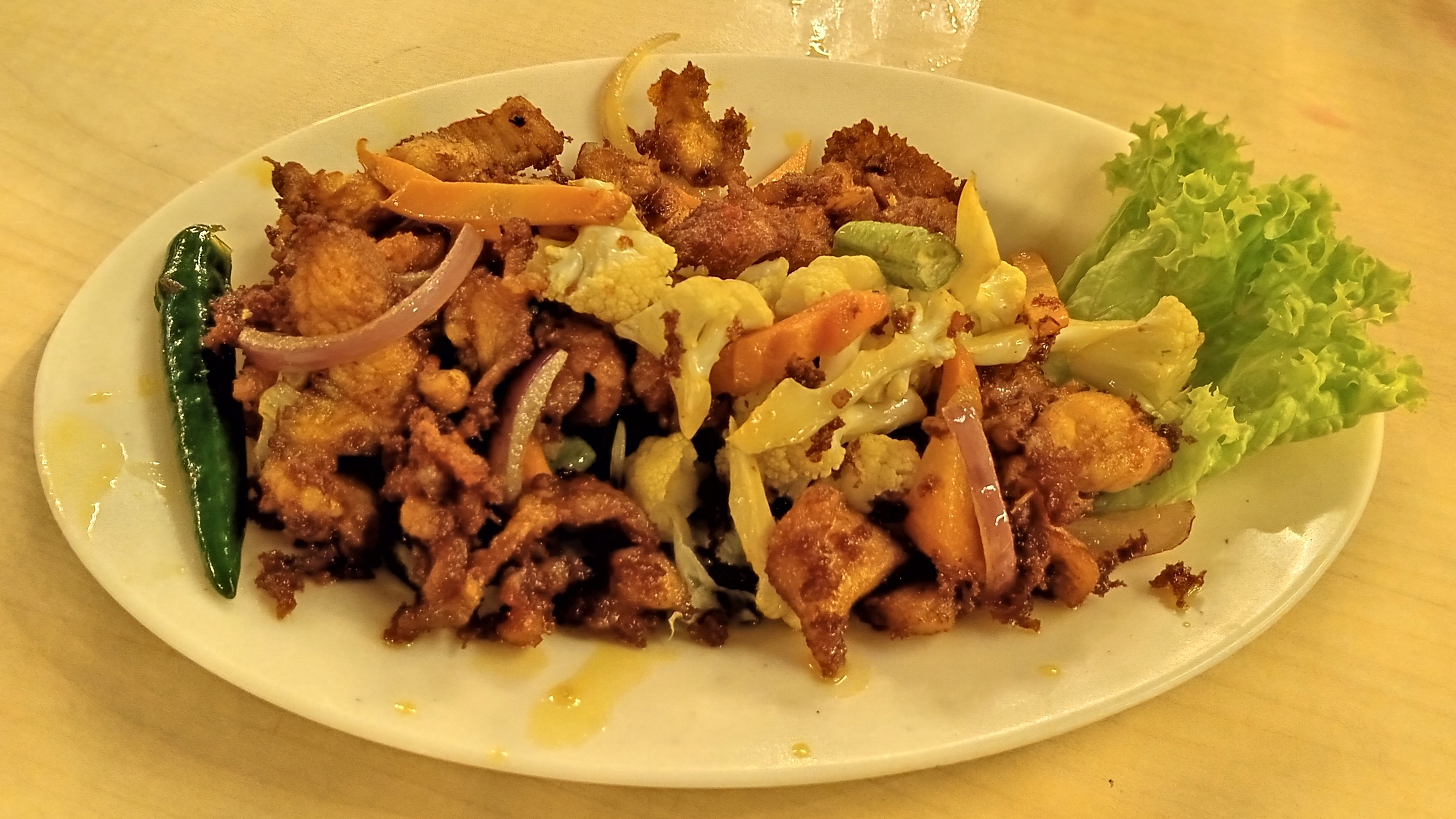
Ayam goreng kunyit

There are many recipes of ayam goreng, among the popular ones are:

- Ayam goreng lengkuas: galangal fried chicken. also known as hayam goreng Bandung: Sundanese Bandung style ayam goreng.
- Ayam goreng Padang: Padang style ayam goreng, there are several variants of Padang fried chicken. The most popular one is quite similar to galangal fried chicken.
- Ayam pop: Padang style skinless pale fried chicken, served with distinct sambal.
- Ayam goreng balado: Padang or Minang style fried chicken. The fried chicken pieces are coated with spicy balado chilli paste.
- Ayam goreng lado ijo: a variant of Minang-style ayam goreng balado using green chili pepper.
- Ayam goreng Jakarta: Jakarta style ayam goreng.
- Ayam goreng Kalasan: Javanese fried chicken from Kalasan village, Yogyakarta.
- Ayam goreng kremes: Javanese fried chicken with kremes crispy granules.
- Ayam goreng serundeng: Javanese fried chicken with serundeng grated coconut.
- Pecel ayam: East Javanese ayam goreng served with sambal.
- Ayam geprek: Yogyakarta crispy battered ayam goreng crushed and mixed with hot and spicy sambal.
- Ayam penyet: penyet is Javanese word for "squeezed" since the fried chicken is served in earthenware mortar upon sambal and squeezed with pestle to mix it with sambal.
- Ayam goreng berempah: Malay fried chicken, fried until golden burnt with crunchy flour bits – the signature of the dish.
- Ayam goreng ketumbar: Central Javanese style fried chicken seasoned with coriander, garlic, and salt.
- Ayam goreng kunyit: Malay cubed chicken bits fried with turmeric coat.

In Indonesia and Malaysia various style of foreign fried chicken is often also called as ayam goreng. Common Southern United States fried chicken is often called ayam goreng tepung or flour-battered or breaded fried chicken. Common McDonald's fried chicken is marketed as "Ayam Goreng McD" in Malaysia.

Ayam goreng variants

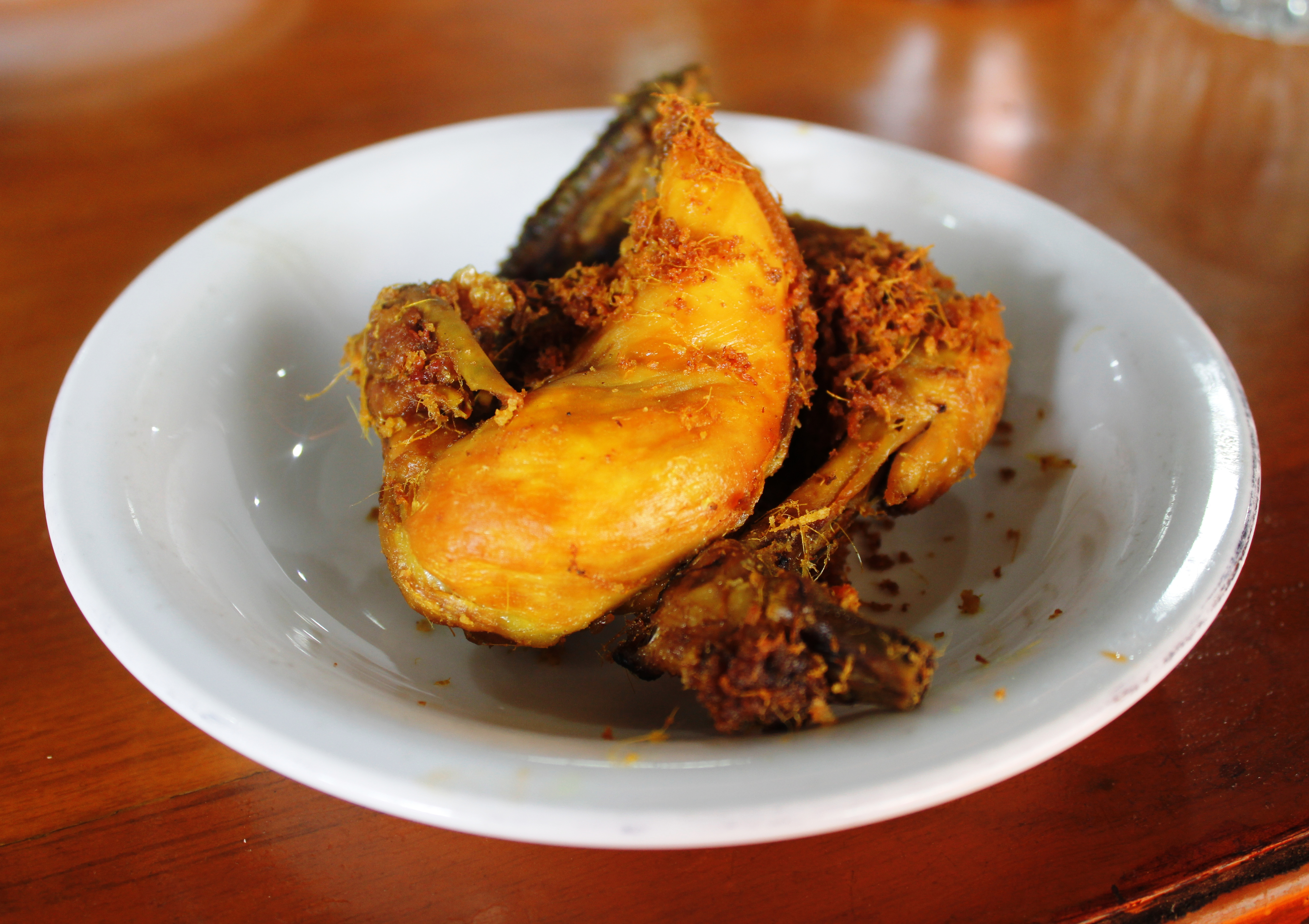
Ayam bumbu, a Minang fried chicken in Aie Badarun restaurant, Tanah Datar.

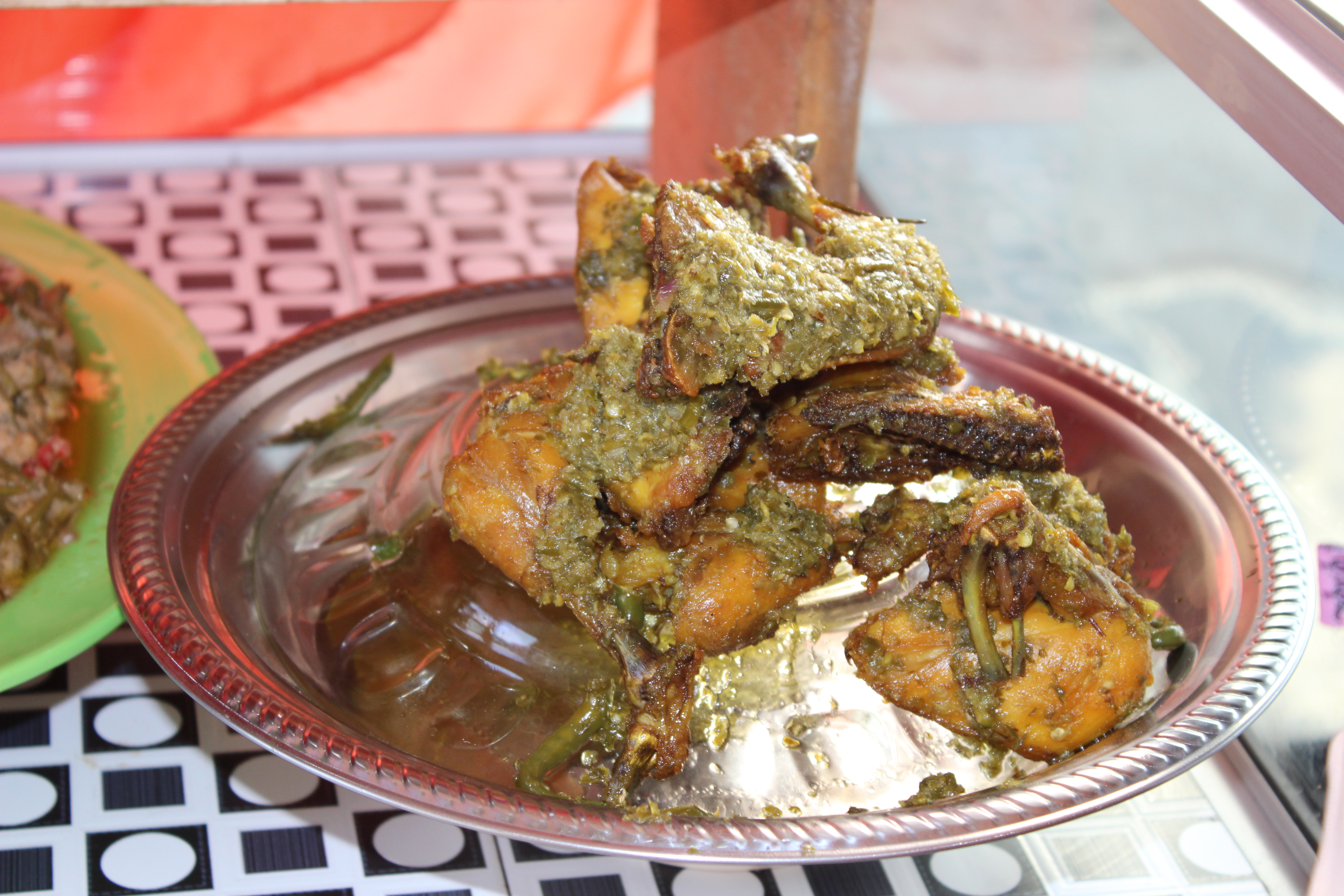
Ayam goreng lado ijo, Minang fried chicken with green pepper

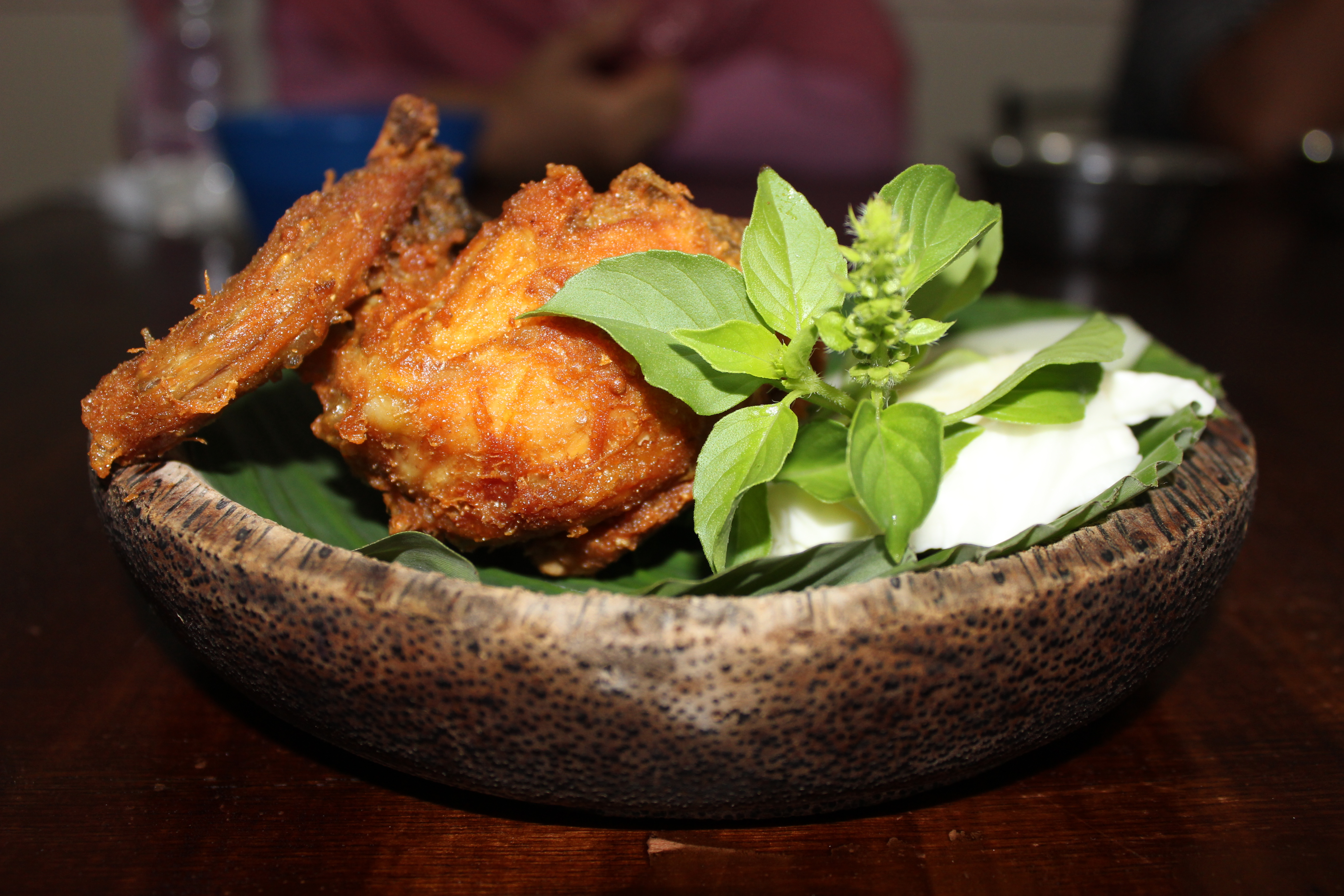
Ayam goreng Jawa, Javanese fried chicken

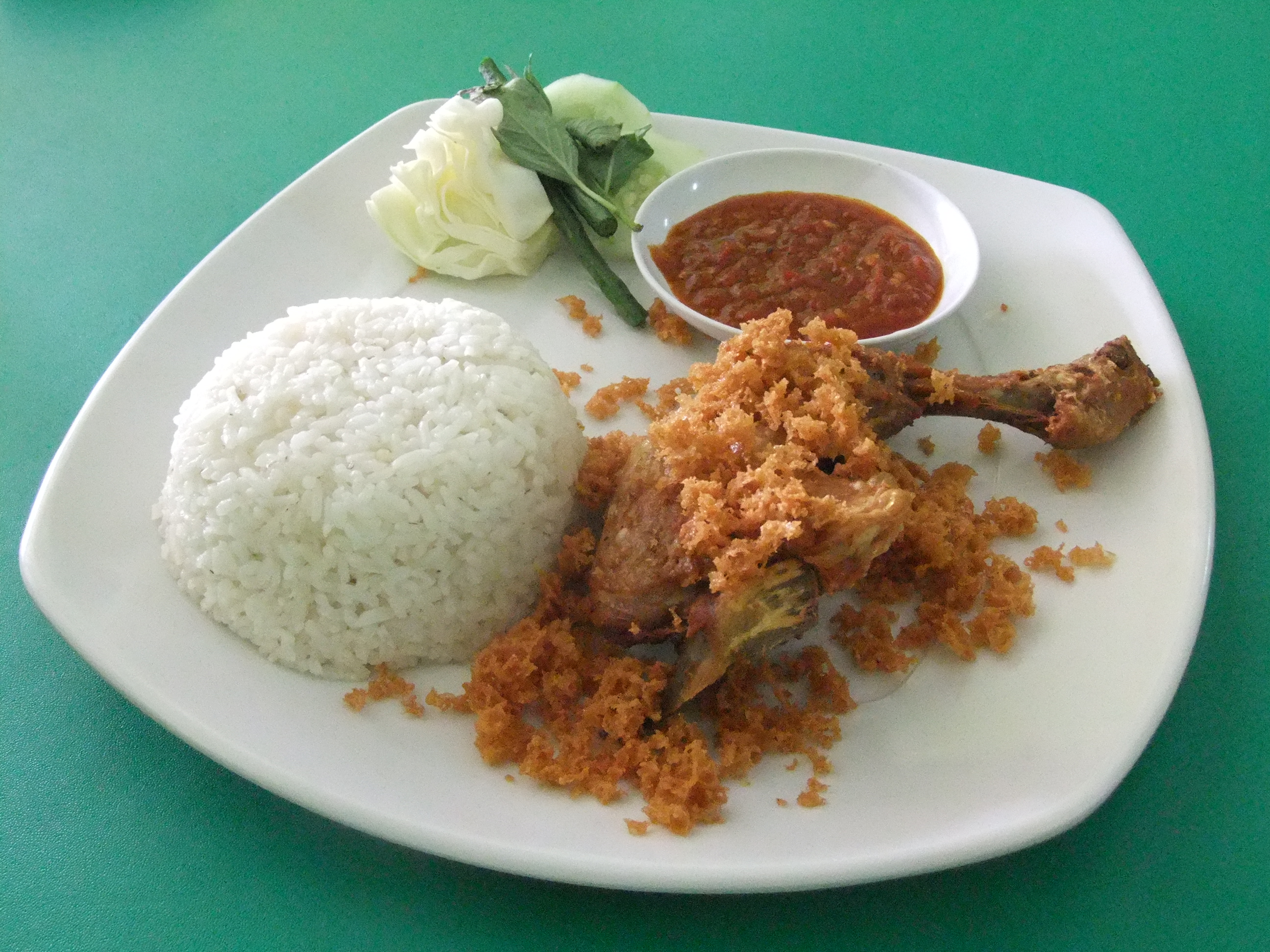
Ayam goreng served with rice and sambal

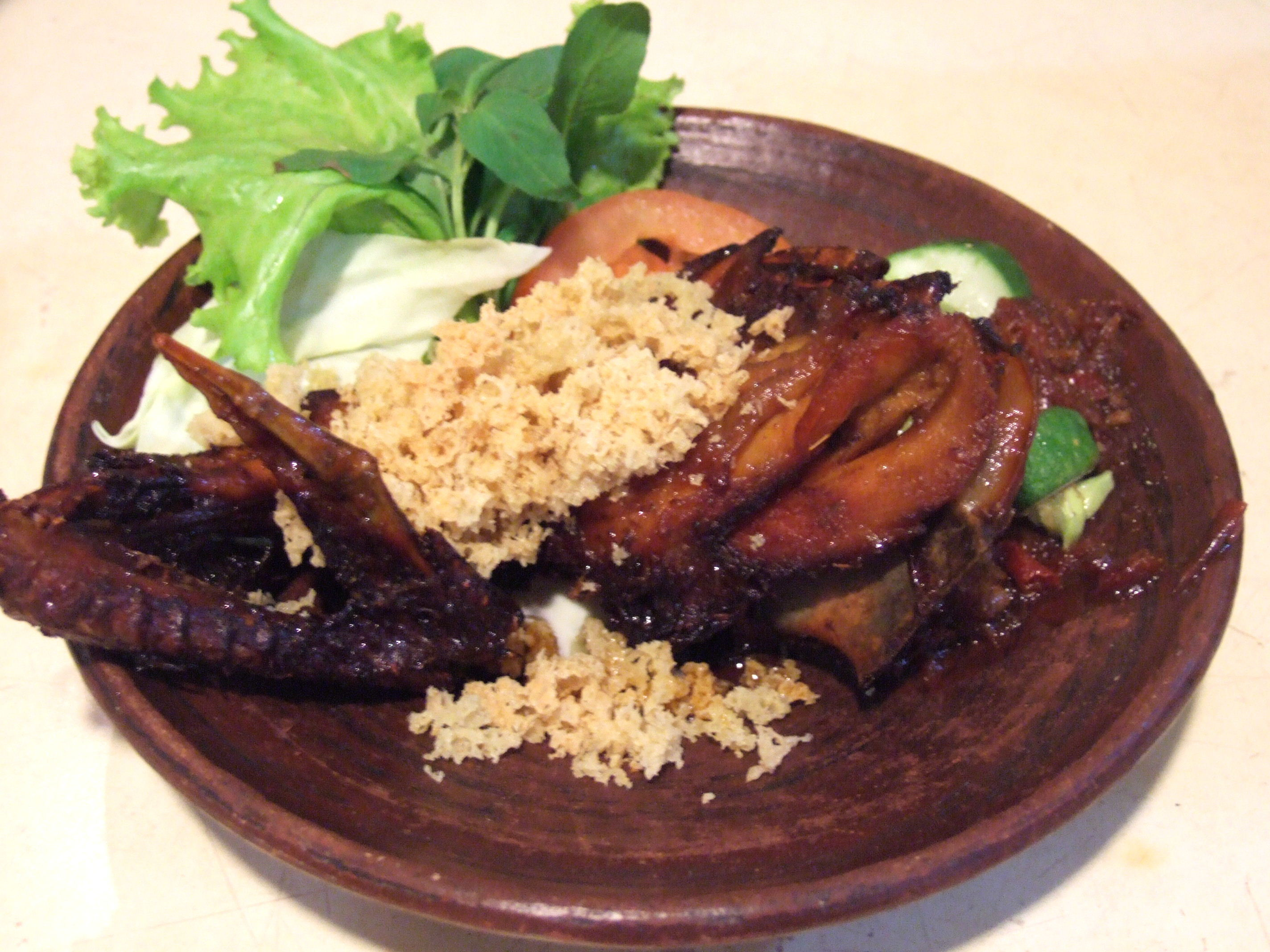
Ayam goreng Kalasan

== See also ==
- Ayam bakar
- Ikan bakar
- List of chicken dishes
