= Nasi lemuni =

Malaysian rice dish

Nasi lemuni ناسي لموني
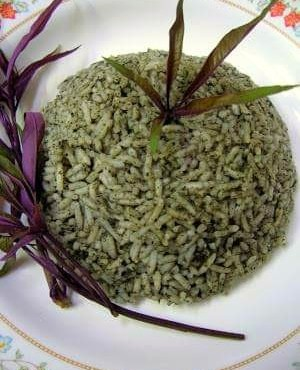
- A serving of nasi lemuni
- Type: Rice dish
- Course: Main
- Place of origin: Malaysia
- Region or state: Northern Region of Peninsular Malaysia, particularly Kedah & Penang
- Created by: Malay
- Main ingredients: Rice, vitex trifolia, garlic, ginger, fenugreek, black pepper, lemongrass, onion, salt

Nasi lemuni (Jawi: ناسي لموني) is a rice dish originating from the northern region of Peninsular Malaysia. The dish is prepared with a herb, Vitex trifolia, locally known as lemuni.

Nasi lemuni is consumed in the same manner as the nasi lemak, complemented with sides and condiments such as sambal, ayam goreng, dried anchovies, cucumber slices and hard boiled egg. It is commonly eaten during breakfast and lunch.

== Health benefits ==
It's traditionally eaten as a confinement dish as it is believed that vitex trifolia can enhance blood flow, balance hormones, and improve one's digestion.

== See also ==
- Nasi dagang
- Nasi lemak
- Nasi kerabu
- Nasi ulam
