= Adjuma =

Variety of chili pepper

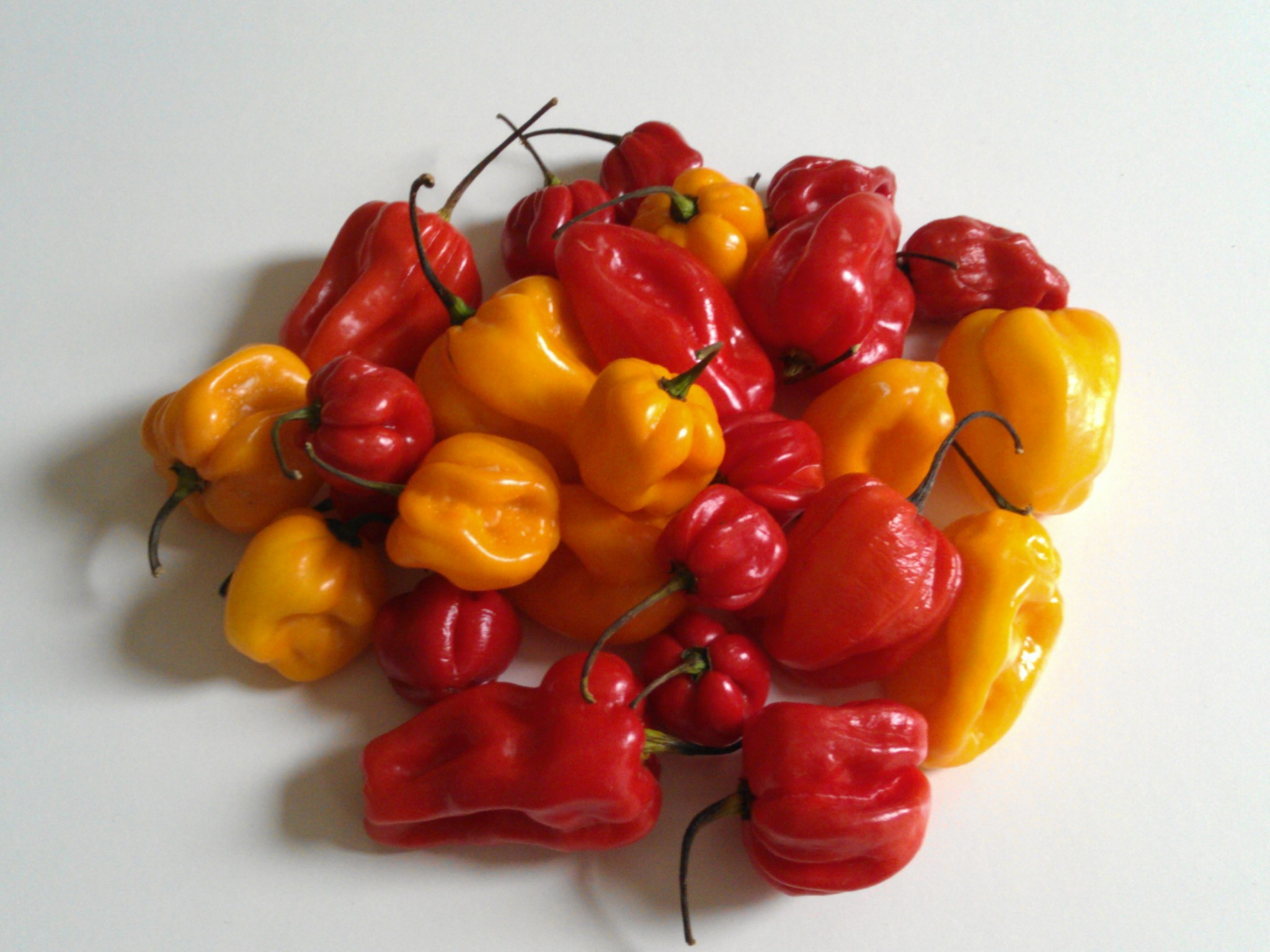
- Species: Capsicum chinense
- Cultivar: 'Adjuma'
- Heat: Very hot
- Scoville scale: 100,000 – 500,000 SHU

Adjuma, adjoema, aji umba, or ojemma is a variety of Capsicum chinense chili pepper, originally from Suriname. The fruits are shaped like small bell peppers, colored red or yellow. This pepper is sometimes sold as Madame Jeanette, although that is a different variety. Adjuma chilies are also very often sold as "habanero" or "Scotch bonnet", due to their similarity.

== See also ==
- List of Capsicum cultivars
