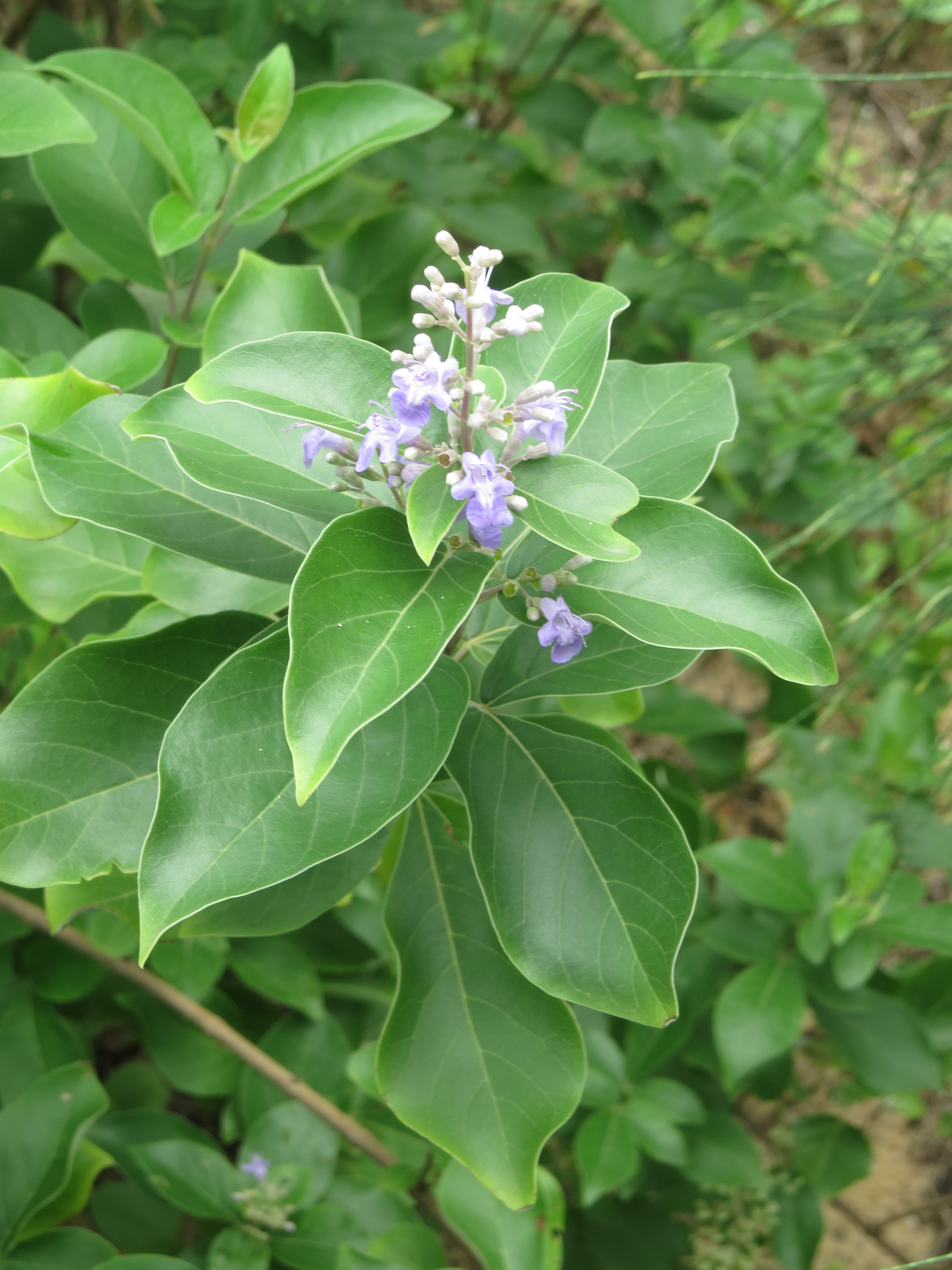
- Flowers

Conservation status
- Least Concern (IUCN 3.1)

Scientific classification
- Kingdom: Plantae
- Clade: Tracheophytes
- Clade: Angiosperms
- Clade: Eudicots
- Clade: Asterids
- Order: Lamiales
- Family: Lamiaceae
- Genus: Vitex
- Species: V. trifolia

Binomial name
- Vitex trifolia L.

Varieties
- Vitex trifolia var. taihangensis (L.B.Guo & S.Q.Zhou) S.L.Chen; Vitex trifolia var. trifolia

Synonyms
- 24 synonyms: for Vitex trifolia; Vitex agnus-castus var. trifolia (L.) Kurz; Vitex indica Mill.; Vitex integerrima Mill.; Vitex trifolia var. trifoliolata Schauer; Vitex variifolia Salisb.; for var. taihangensis; Vitex taihangensis L.B.Guo & S.Q.Zhou; for var. trifolia; Vitex agnus-castus var. javanica Kuntze; Vitex agnus-castus var. subtrisecta Kuntze; Vitex benthamiana Domin; Vitex iriomotensis Ohwi; Vitex langundi W.G.Maxwell; Vitex neocaledonica Gand.; Vitex paniculata Lam.; Vitex petiolaris Domin; Vitex rotundifolia var. heterophylla Makino ex H.Hara; Vitex rotundifolia f. heterophylla (Makino ex H.Hara) Kitam.; Vitex trifolia var. acutifolia Benth.; Vitex trifolia f. albiflora Moldenke; Vitex trifolia var. heterophylla (Makino ex H.Hara) Moldenke; Vitex trifolia var. parviflora Benth.; Vitex trifolia var. subtrisecta (Kuntze) Moldenke; Vitex trifolia var. variegata Moldenke; Vitex triphylla Royle; Vitis triphylla Noronha

= Vitex trifolia =

Species of flowering plant

Vitex trifolia, commonly known as the simpleleaf chastetree or blue Vitex, is a species of plant in the mint family Lamiaceae. It is a shrub or small tree native to coastal areas of the Indo-Pacific region.

== Description ==
Vitex trifolia is a large coastal shrub or small tree, up to 8 m (26 ft) in height and a trunk up to 20 cm (7.9 in) diameter. The leaves are oppositely arranged along the stems and are usually compound, composed of three or five leaflets. The central leaflets may grow up to 12 cm (4.7 in) long and 4 cm (1.6 in) wide, and the lateral leaflets may be 5 cm (2.0 in) long and 2 cm (0.79 in) wide. The upper surfaces of the leaves are green and the lower surfaces are grayish green.

The flowers are born in panicles or clusters up to 25 cm (10 in) in length. Individual flowers have mauve or purple, five-lobed corolla tubes that are about 5 mm (0.20 in) long and 3 mm (0.12 in) wide; they are finely hairy outside and have a dense patch of longer hairs in the mouth of the tube. The stamens are 3–6 mm (0.12–0.24 in) long, and the ovary is globular and about 1.5 mm (0.06 in) diameter. The fleshy fruits are up to 6 mm (0.24 in) in diameter and contain four small seeds.

== Taxonomy ==
Two varieties are recognised as of April 2026, Vitex trifolia var. taihangensis and the autonym Vitex trifolia var. trifolia.

== Distribution and habitat ==
Vitex trifolia naturally occurs close to coasts in beach forest and the landward side of mangrove swamps, usually below 150 m (490 ft) altitude.

It is native to the following regions as defined in the World Geographical Scheme for Recording Plant Distributions:

- Africa: Kenya, Tanzania, Somalia, Mozambique, KwaZulu-Natal, Comoros, Madagascar, Mauritius.
- Asia-Temperate: Afghanistan, Iran, China North-Central, China South-Central, China Southeast, Hainan, Nansei-shoto, Taiwan.
- Asia-Tropical: Assam, Bangladesh, India, Nepal, Sri Lanka, Andaman Islands, Cambodia, Laos, Myanmar, Thailand, Vietnam, Borneo, Jawa, Lesser Sunda Islands, Malaya, Maluku, Philippines, Sulawesi, Sumatera, Bismarck Archipelago, New Guinea, Solomon Islands.
- Australia: New South Wales, Northern Territory, Queensland, Western Australia.
- Pacific: Caroline Islands, Marianas, Marshall Islands, Wake Island, Cook Islands, Line Islands, Marquesas, Society Islands, Tuamotu, Tubuai Islands.

== Conservation status ==
The species is classed as least concern by the International Union for Conservation of Nature (IUCN). The reason for this assessment is that the plant is widely distributed and also widely cultivated, and despite some loss of habitat it is thought to be not under any threat.

== Traditional medicine ==
In Samoa it is used to relieve fever, exhaustion, asthma, headache and rashes. In Fiji a poultice of the leaves is used to treat broken bones and abrasions; in the Solomon Islands the leaves are used as a treatment for headache; on Bougainville it is used as a laxative; in Truk the leaves are made into a tea to treat itching skin.

The species is known as 'lemuni' in Peninsular Malaysia, and is used to make the Malay dish Nasi lemuni. The dish is said to provide a number of health benefits, and is eaten as a confinement food for postpartum mothers to aid recovery.

== Gallery ==
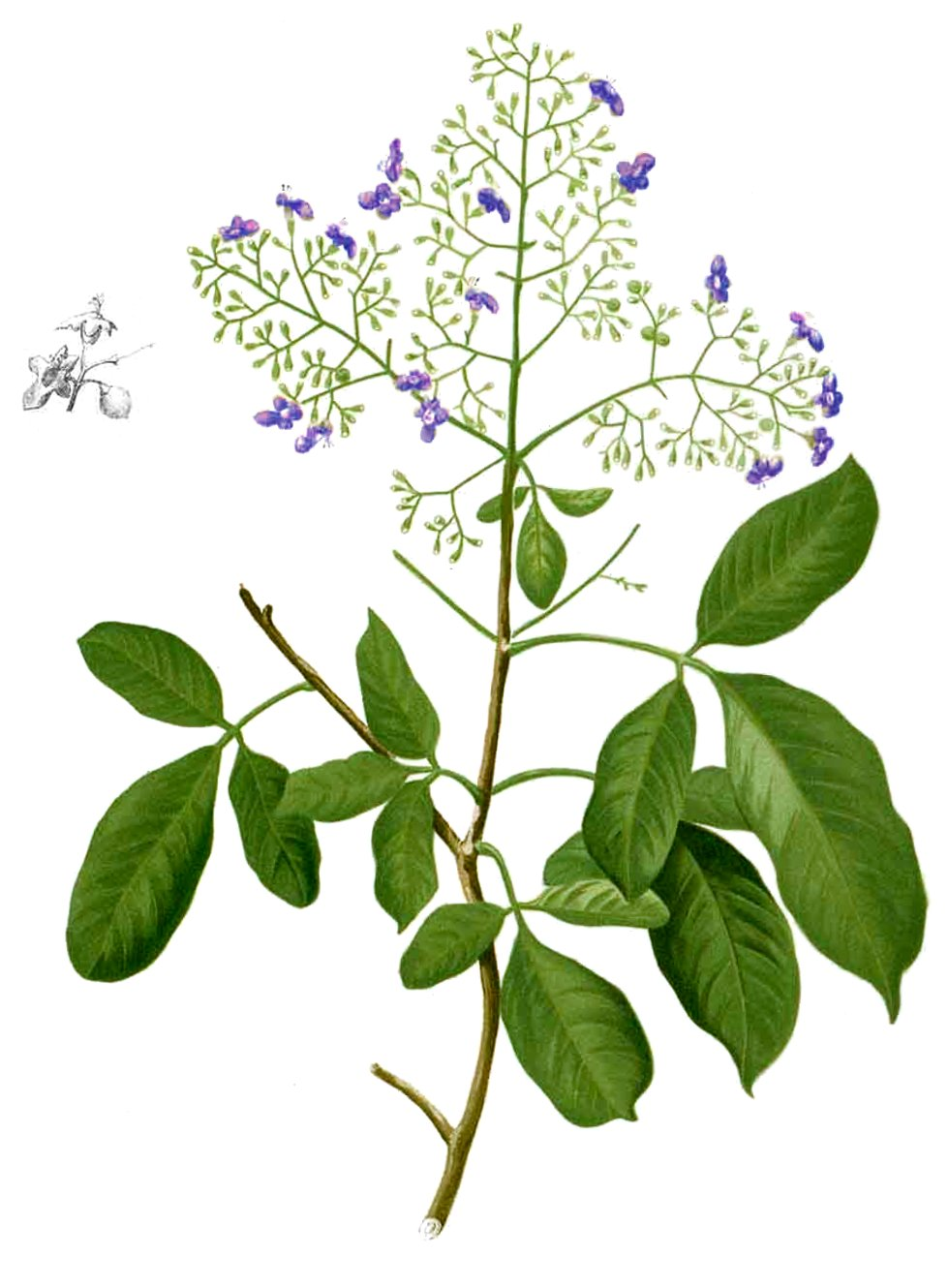
Illustration from c. 1880

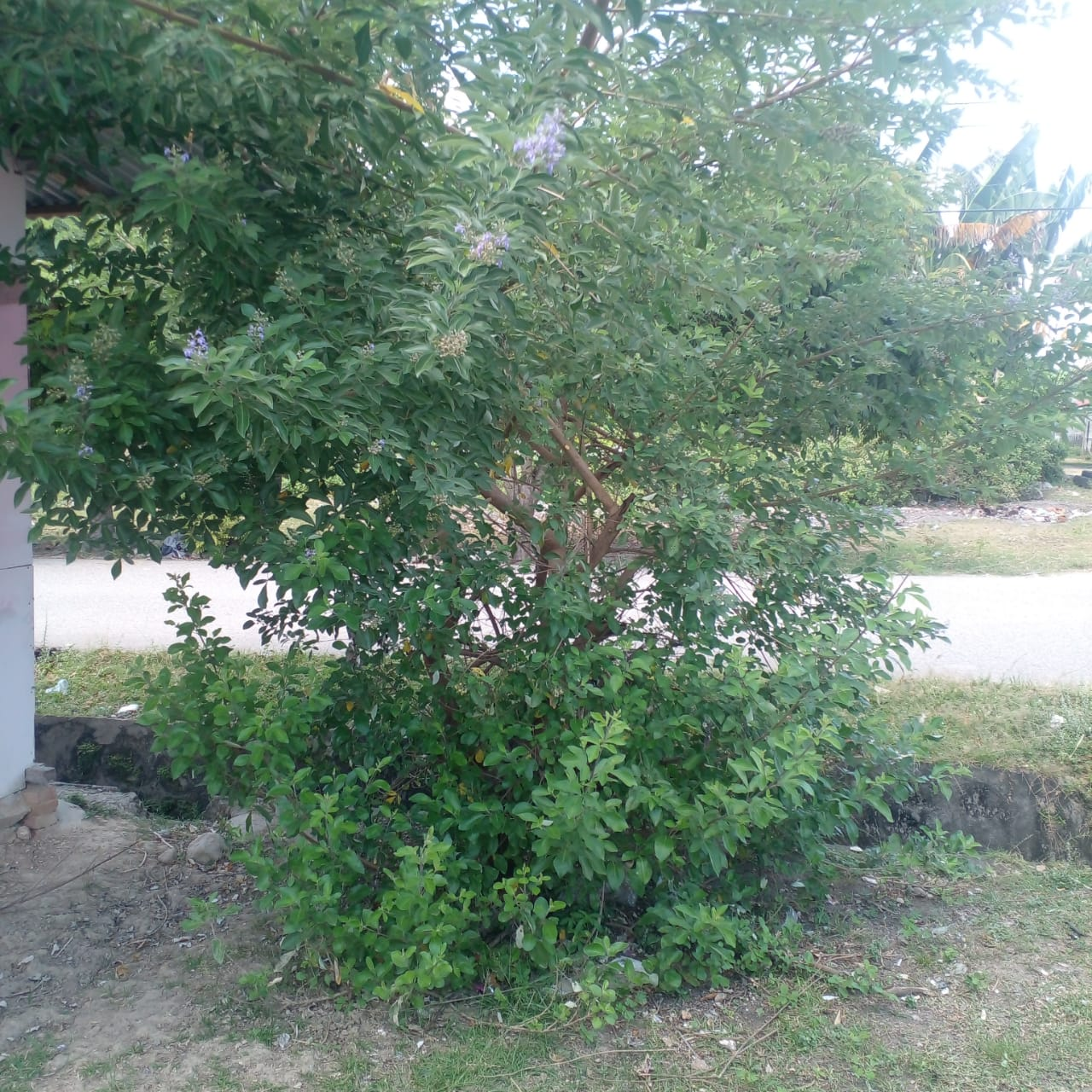
Habit

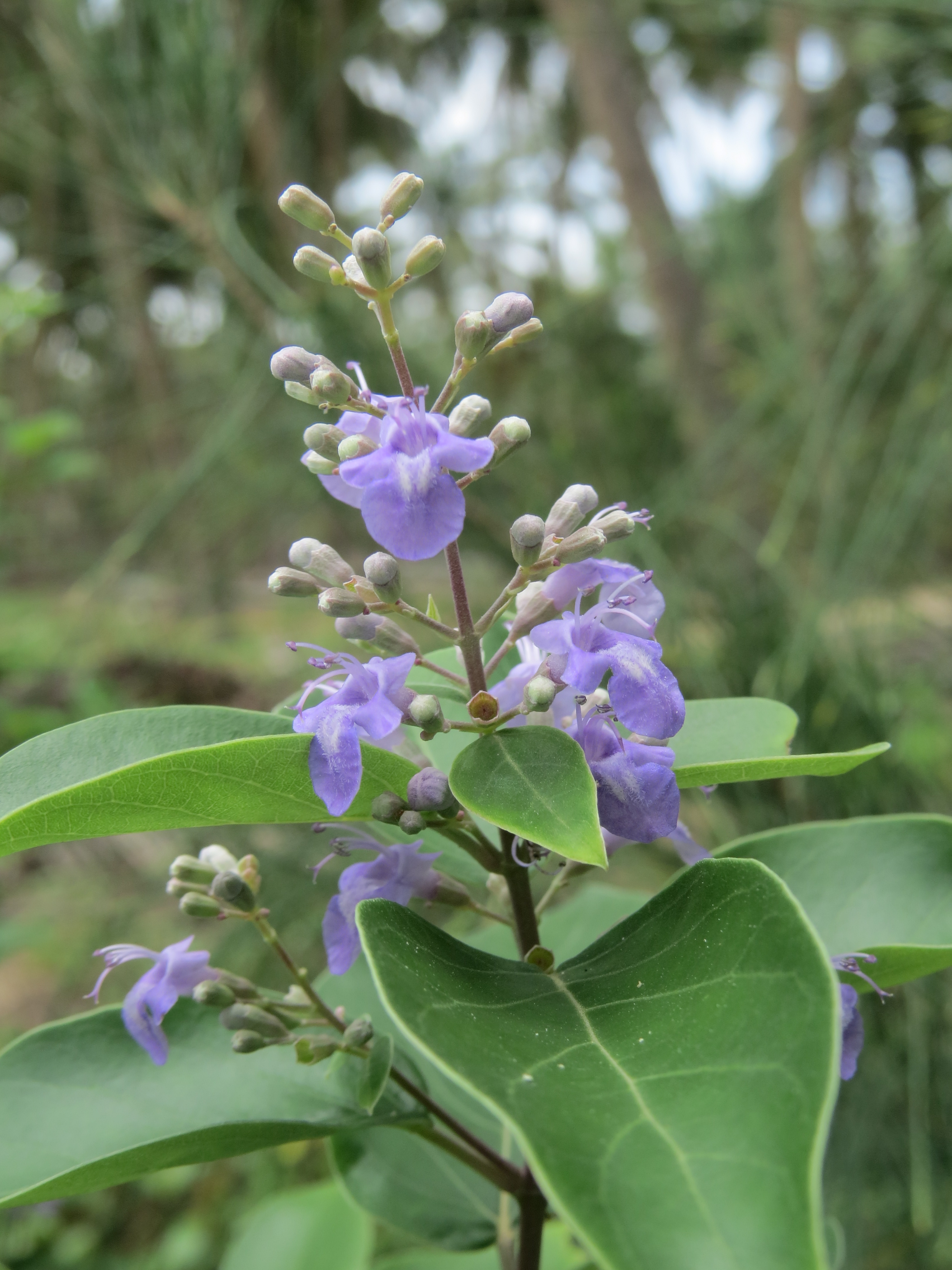
Flowers

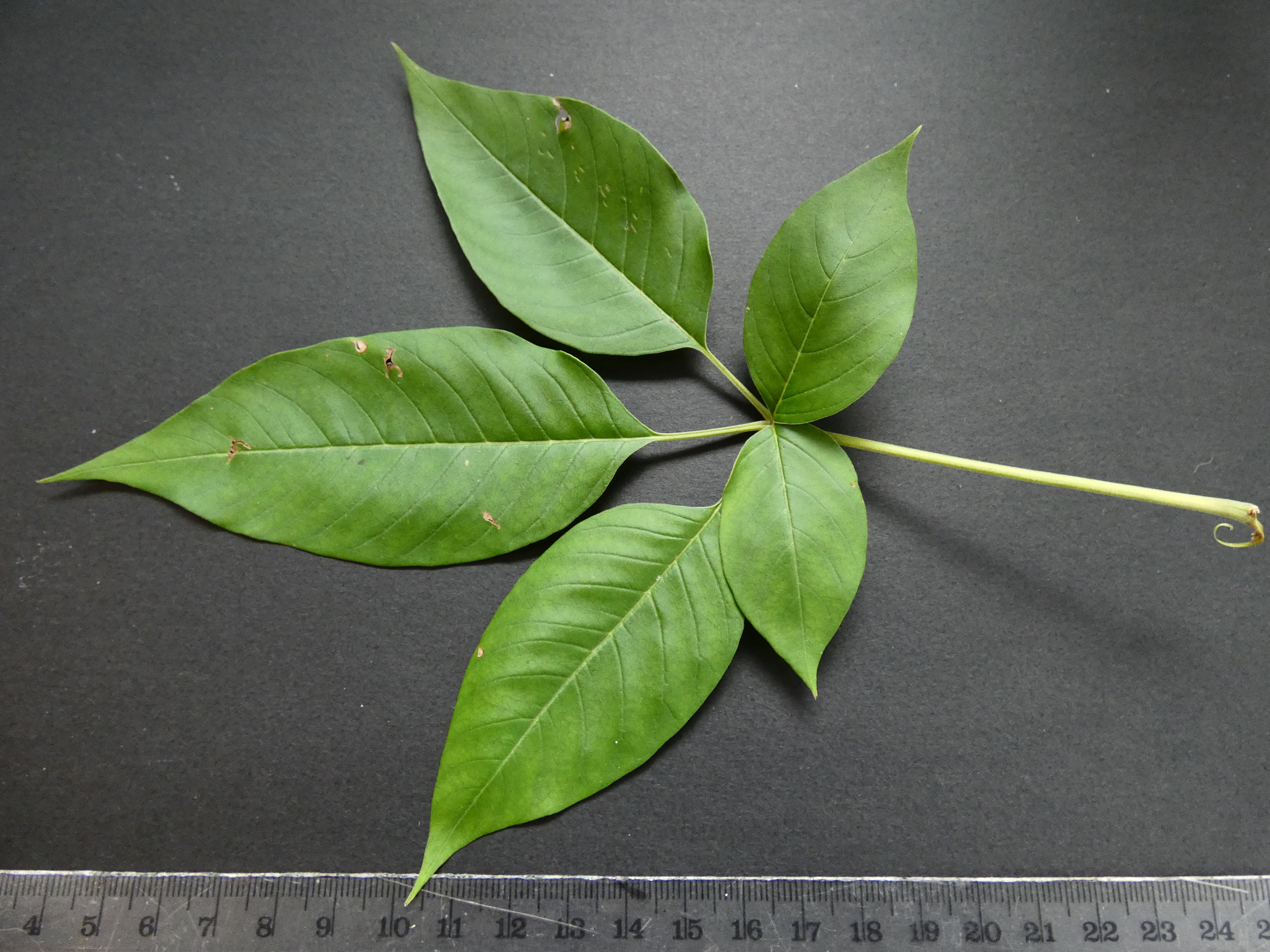
Leaf with five leaflets

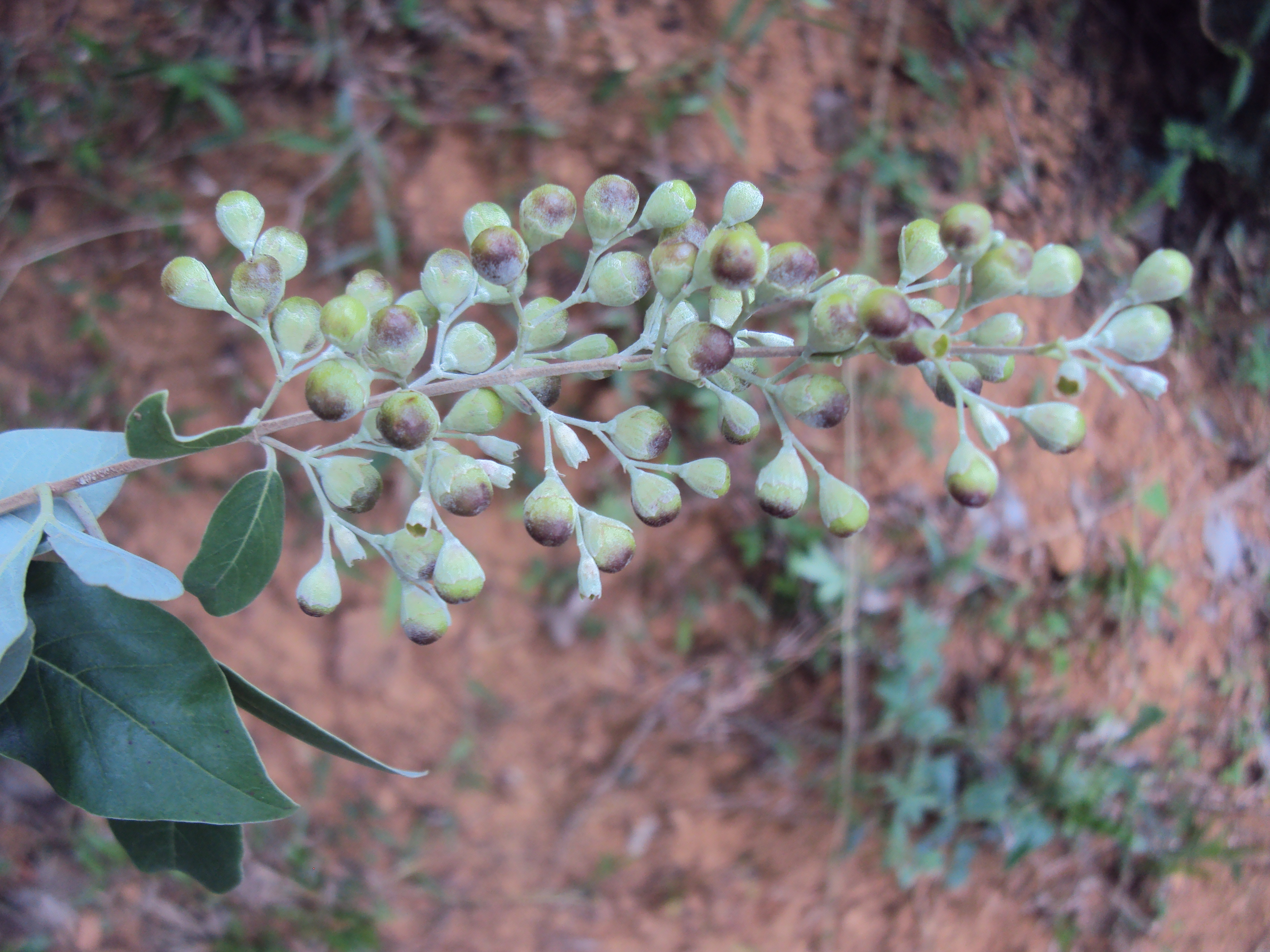
Fruit

== Common names ==
- English: common blue vitex, hand of Mary, Indian privet, simpleleaf chastetree, three-leaved chaste tree.
- Spanish: abrecaminos, vencedor, vencedora.
- Chinese: man jing
- Portuguese (Brasil): tarumâ
- Seychelles - bois noux noux
- Cook Islands - rara
- Tonga - lalatahi
- Samoa - namulega
- India:
  - Sanskrit - jalanirgundi; sindhuka; surasa; vrikshaha
  - Hindi - nichinda; panikisanbhalu; sufed-sanbhalu
  - Manipuri - urikshibi
  - Bengali - paniki-shumbala; pani-samalu
  - Kannada - nira-lakki-gida
  - Malayalam - lagondi; nirnoschi
  - Tamil - nirnochi; sirunochi (நொச்சி)
  - Telugu - niruvavili; shiruvavili (నీరువావిలి)
- Indonesia
  - Indonesian - legundi -> Dutch: legoendi
  - Aceh - grupheueng
  - Bali - liligundi
  - Bugi - lawaranill (ᨒᨓᨑᨊᨗ)
- Philippines - lagundi, halamang gamot
- Malaysia - lemuni (especially in northern region)
