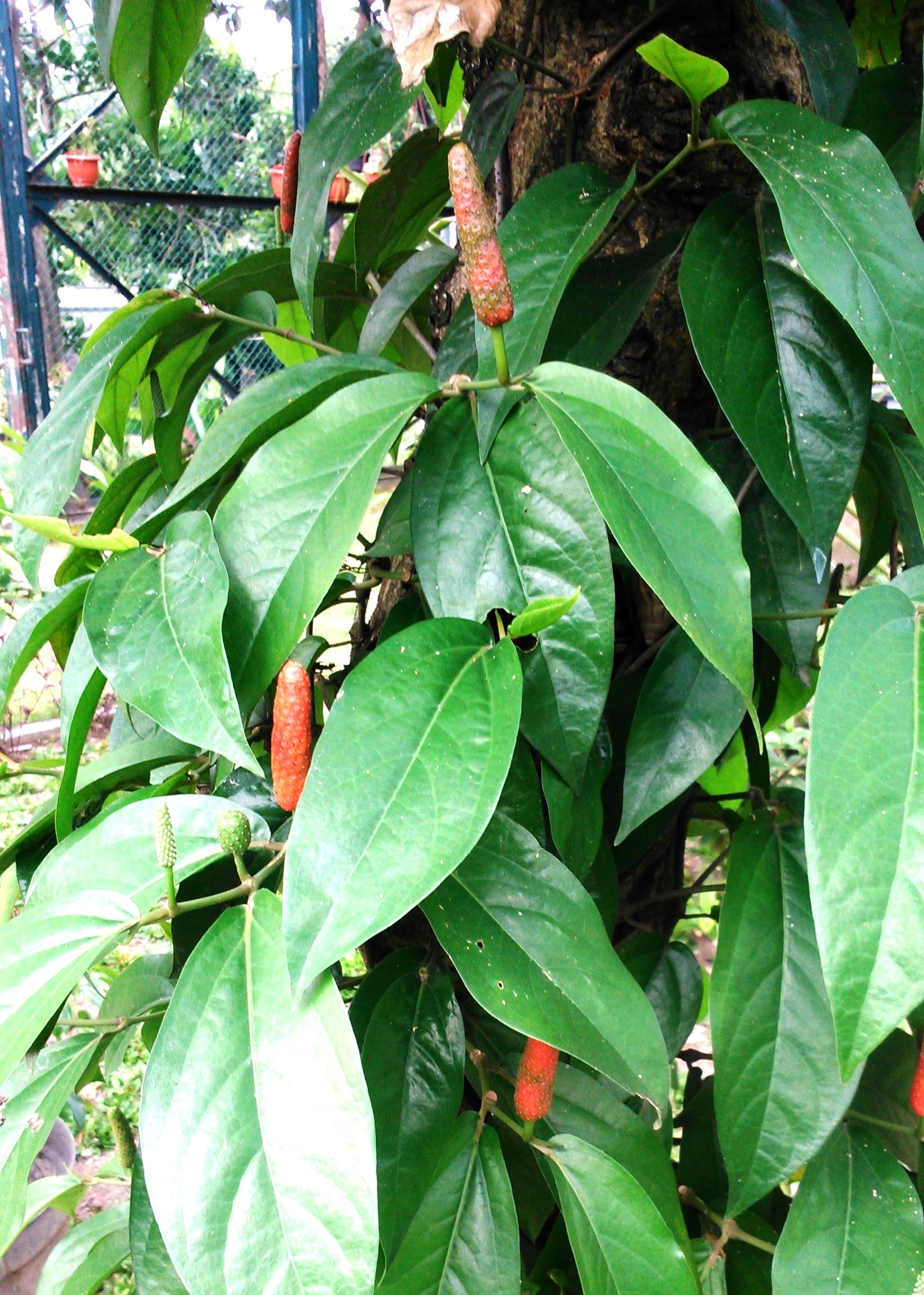

Scientific classification
- Kingdom: Plantae
- Clade: Tracheophytes
- Clade: Angiosperms
- Clade: Magnoliids
- Order: Piperales
- Family: Piperaceae
- Genus: Piper
- Species: P. retrofractum

Binomial name
- Piper retrofractum Vahl

Synonyms
- Piper officinarum (Miq.) C.DC.

= Piper retrofractum =

Species of plant

Piper retrofractum, the Balinese long pepper or Javanese long pepper, is a flowering vine in the family Piperaceae, cultivated for its fruit, which is usually dried and used as a spice and seasoning. This species is native to Java island in Indonesia.

== Names ==
In Cambodia, it is known as ដីប្លី dei-phlei and in Thailand as ดีปลี deebplee. In the Malay Archipelago, the fruit was once known as cabai; however, its culinary popularity was superseded by the chilli, brought over from the New World by European traders, resulting in a semantic shift in which the new crop became cabai, and the old became cabai jawa.

== Botany ==
The plant is a climbing vine with stems of about 3–4 mm in diameter. Its leaves have blades that are glabrous, lanceolate, with acuminate apex and asymmetric base, and are about 10–12 cm long and 3–3.5 cm wide. The vine has been described as dioecious or monoecious, with male spikes of about 5 cm long and female spikes about 4 cm long and 0.5–1 cm wide, and part of the ovaries are attached on the axis. Its berries are spherical and arranged densely on the axis.
