= Madame Jeanette =

Variety of chili pepper

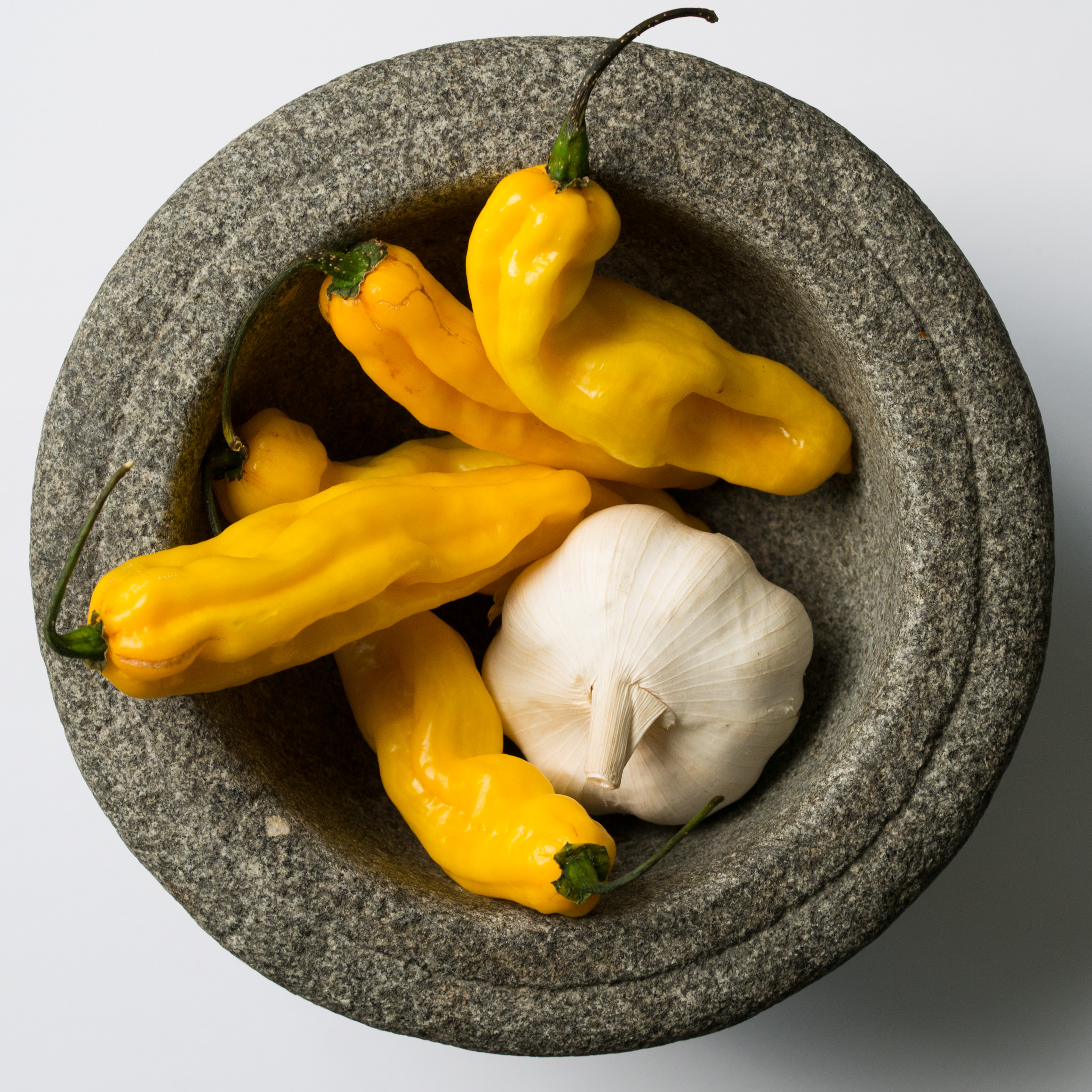
- Species: Capsicum chinense
- Origin: Suriname
- Heat: Very hot
- Scoville scale: 100,000–350,000 SHU

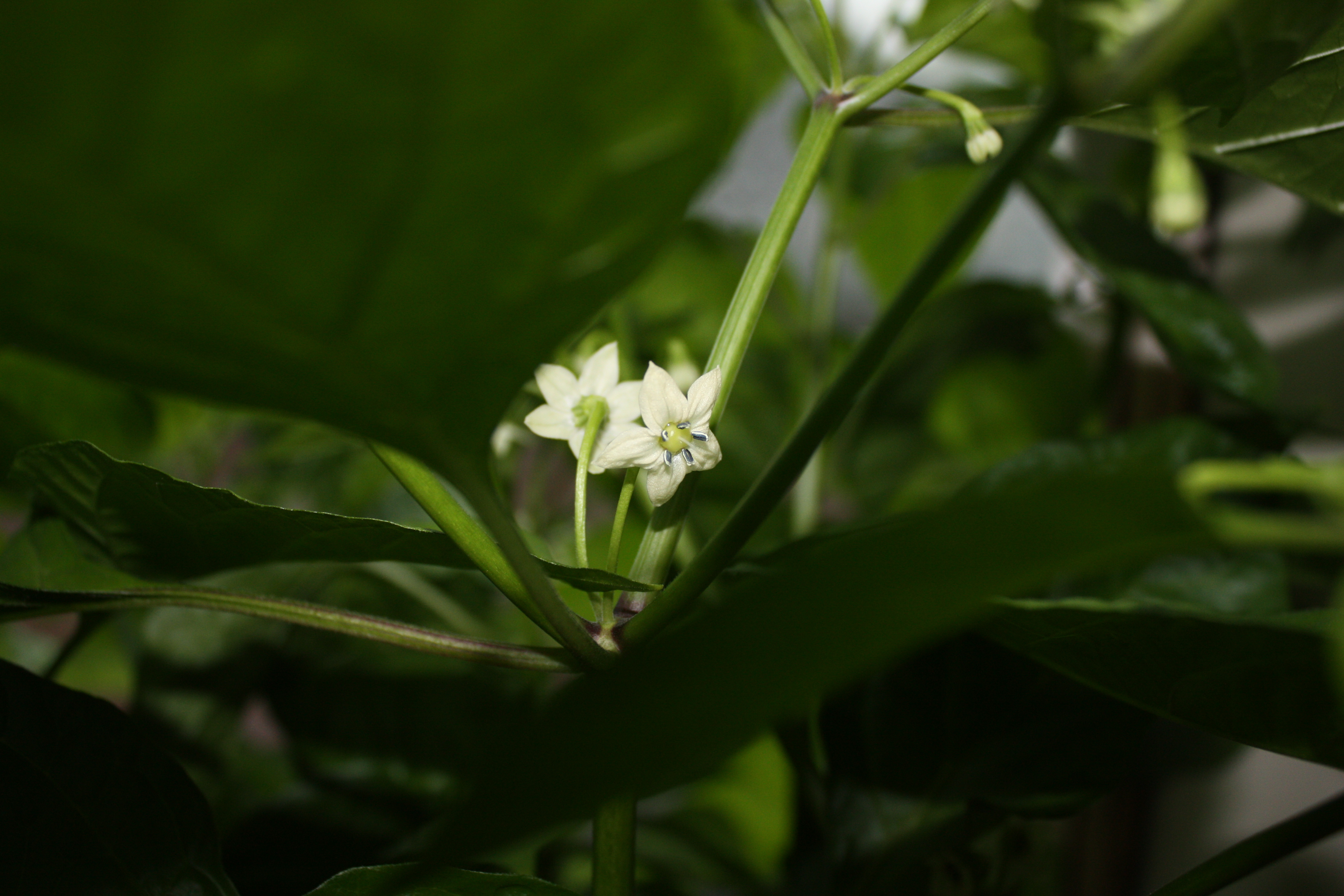
Close-up photograph of a typical Madame Jeanette (Capsicum chinense) flower

Madame Jeanette is a chili pepper cultivar of the species Capsicum chinense, originally from Suriname.

The fruits are shaped like small bell peppers. Madame Jeanette chilis are very hot, rated 125,000–325,000 on the Scoville scale. The peppers ripen to reddish-yellow, similar to Scotch Bonnet peppers, but are larger and not symmetrical. Its flavour is described as "fruity", with hints of mango and pineapple. It is often confused with the yellow adjuma, which is less elongated and said to be spicier but less flavourful. Madame Jeanette is used in almost all facets of Surinamese cuisine. The plant is prolific, has relatively compact growth, dislikes cool sites, and will also grow indoors.

== See also ==
- Capsicum chinense
- List of Capsicum cultivars
