= Aspergillus wentii =

Scientific classification
- Kingdom: Fungi
- Division: Ascomycota
- Class: Eurotiomycetes
- Order: Eurotiales
- Family: Aspergillaceae
- Genus: Aspergillus
- Species: A. wentii

Binomial name
- Aspergillus wentii Wehmer (1896)

Synonyms
- Aspergillus archaeoflavus Blochwitz (1933); Aspergillus wentii var. minimus Nakazawa, R. et al (1934); Aspergillus wentii var. fumeus Z.T. Qi & Z.M. Sun (1994)

Fungus of the genus Aspergillus

Aspergillus wentii is an asexual, filamentous, endosymbiotic fungus belonging to the mold genus, Aspergillus. It is a common soil fungus with a cosmopolitan distribution, although it is primarily found in subtropical regions. Found on a variety of organic materials, A. wentii is known to colonize corn, cereals, moist grains, peanuts and other ground nut crops. It is also used in the manufacture of biodiesel from lipids and is known for its ability to produce enzymes used in the food industry.

== History and taxonomy ==
Aspergillus wentii was first described by German mycologist Carl Friedrich Wilhelm Wehmer in 1896. Following a morphology-based classification scheme he created in 1901, Wehmer grouped A. wentii under a category of large Aspergilli that he called the "Macroaspergilli" due to its large fruiting body structure (the conidial head). The taxonomic position of A. wentii remained unclear within the genus as A. wentii Wehmer synonyms (A. archaeoflavus Blochwitz and Aspergillus wentii var. minimus) were presented by Drs. Charles Thom and Kenneth Raper as possible variations or strains. The first A. wentii group was proposed by Drs. Thom and Raper in 1945. This original A. wentii group was classified under the Circumdati subgenus of the genus Aspergillus and included 4 fungal species currently known as A. avenaceus Smith, A. panamensis Raper and Thom, A. alliaceus Thom and Church, and A. wentii Wehmer. Presently, Aspergillus wentii Wehmer is the only remaining fungus of the four fungi that originally made up the "A. wentii group". The 3 former members of the A. wentii group (A. avenaceus, A. panamensis, and A. alliaceus) have since been reassigned to different Aspergillus subgenera (A. flavus group, A. ustus group, and A. ocheaceus group) respectively. Drs. Charles Thom and Dorothy Fennell revised the A. wentii group in 1965 to include Aspergillus thomii Smith and A. terricola Marchal along with A. wentii Wehmer. However, Aspergillus group classifications within subgenera became obsolete in the 1980s being replaced by sections.

The new Aspergilli sections adapted and revised previously established morphological and physiological characteristics of Aspergillli groups and incorporated DNA sequencing analyses to confirm phylogenetic relationships among related Aspergilli. Many species were reassigned to new Aspergilli sections as phylogenetic relationships were confirmed by DNA and genome sequencing experiments. As a result, A. wentii and A. dimorphicus, previously described as synonyms within the A. wentii section, were later confirmed to be distinct species.

== Growth and morphology ==
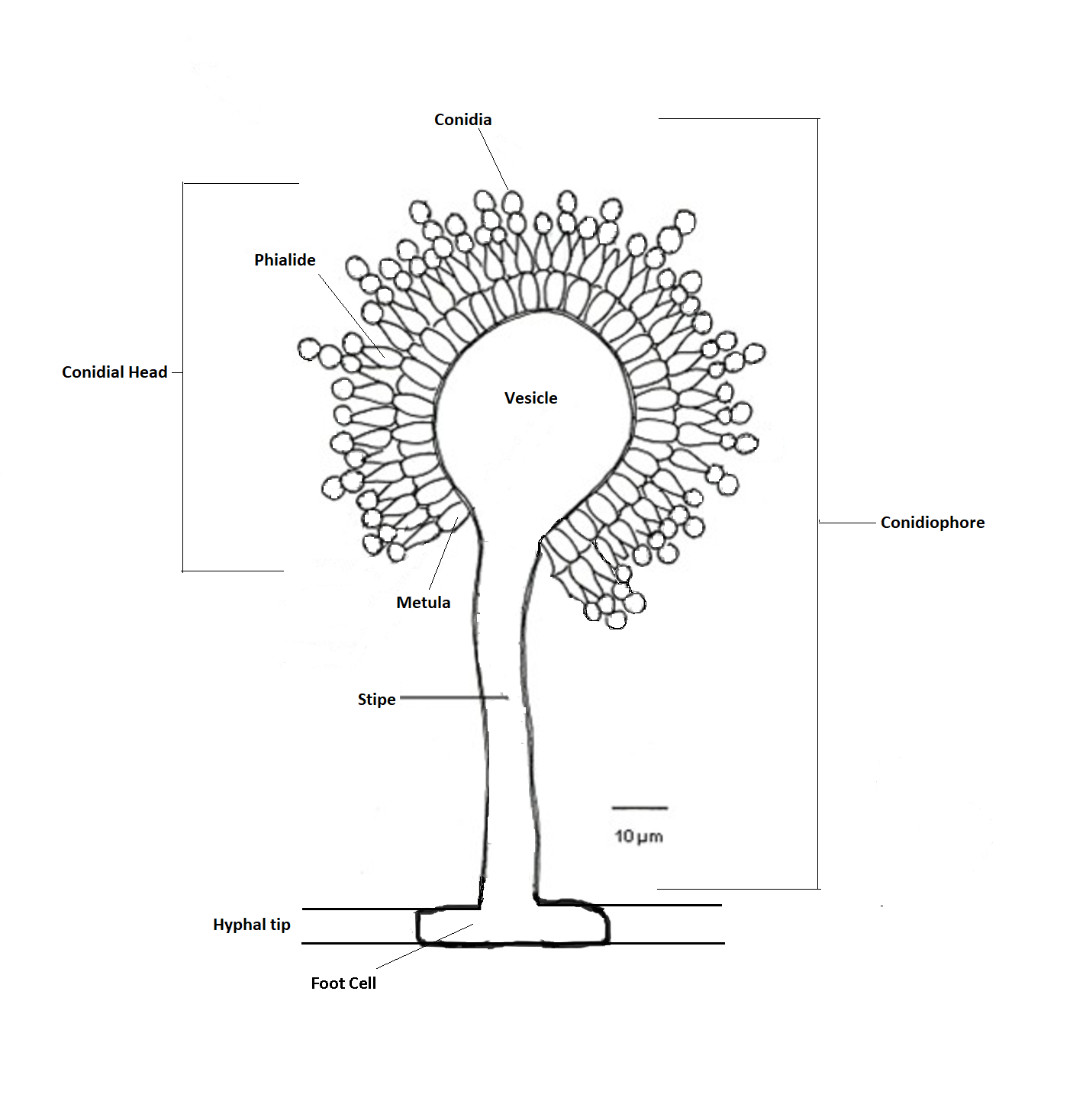
Diagram of the key morphological structures of Aspergillus wentii, including the conidiophore, conidia, conidial head, vesicle, phialides, metullae, stipe, and foot cell

Aspergillus wentii produces single-celled, globose, conidia (singular conidium) in unbranched, filamentous chains. Young asexual conidia (also called spores) start off smooth, colourless, and ellipsoidal before maturing into rough, globose spores approximately 4.5–5 μm in diameter. Aspergillus wentii conidia can appear anywhere from darker yellow to brown in colour when mature and have a single wall, unlike related species Aspergillus tamarii whose conidia have a double wall membrane. The elongating chains of conidia are dispersed through slightly pigmented, vase-shaped structures known as phialides that are around 6–8 μm. The phialides sit on top of almond-shaped structures known as metulae that are about 10–20 μm in length and also slightly pigmented. Together, these metulae and phialides structures radiate outward from a spheroid structure known as the vesicle, layering around its entire surface area. The vesicle can grow to a diameter of 80 μm, with a completely fertile spheroid surface area. Collectively, this large globose complex made up of the vesicle at the centre with metulae and phialides radiating outward is called the conidial head. The conidial head can vary from tan-yellow to darker coffee-coloured brown and grow as big as 500–800 μm in diameter. The conidial head is affixed atop of a thick, aseptate stalk known as a stipe. Aspergillus wentii stipes are notable for being interspersed and longer than average Aspergillus stalks. The stipe and conidial head together form a translucent, rod-shaped structure collectively known as the conidiophore that in turn, extends from the hyphal tip. The conidiophore can grow anywhere between 3 and 5 millimeters in length, has a glassy appearance (described as hyaline) and typically have a smooth texture, although granular conidiophores have been observed. Aspergillus wentii produces aerial hyphae, white or sometimes yellow in colour that can grow to a few millimeters in length. Aspergillus wentii foot cells have dense walls and are branched.

Overall, Aspergillus wentii colonies appear dense, floccose (fluffy) to cottony, and are white in colour. Colonies can grow up to 2–3.5 cm in diameter on Czapek agar when grown under controlled conditions for a span of 7 days. Optimal growth of Aspergillus wentii in culture occurs on glucose media at pH 6.0 at a temperature of 30°C for a duration of 7 days.

Dr. Wehmer originally described seeing cleistothecia; however, there have been no reports of such structures on Aspergillus wentii since. According to subsequent authors, it is believed that Wehmer misinterpreted densely packed masses of hyphae for cleistothecia which are structurally similar.

=== Reproduction ===
Aspergillus wentii is an asexual fungus with no known sexual state. Although Aspergillus wentii is currently a mitotic fungus, vestigial remnants found in the hyphae of A. wentii are evidence that ancestral Aspergilli once had the ability to sexually reproduce by meiosis. Morphological similarities observed between hyphal masses in Aspergillus wentii and young sexual structures (cleistothecia) found in Chaetosartorya chrysella are further vestigial evidence of meiotic ability in ancestral Aspergilli. Phylogenetic analysis of DNA sequences revealed a strong phylogenetic relation between the obligate asexual species Aspergillus wentii and meiotic (sexual) species Chaetosartorya chrysella, suggesting that the two species are close relatives, having recently diverged from the same sexually-reproducing ancestor.

== Physiology ==
Aspergillus wentii is a filamentous fungus. In culture, optimal growth of Aspergillus wentii occurs on glucose media at pH 6.0 at a temperature of 30 °C. Aspergillus wentii grows well on carbon-based media supplemented with mannitol, fructose, galactose, sucrose, lactose, or maltose. Generally, Aspergillus wentii exhibits the highest growth rates in carbon-based media, although it can be grown on nitrogen-based media with lower growth yields. Aspergillus wentii does not grow well on creatine sucrose agar (CREA) and produces sterile hyphae on malt extract agar.

Aspergillus wentii is moderately xerophile, able to tolerate very dry conditions with low water activity (with an a_{W} of 0.73–0.79 for growth and germination). In its natural environment, Aspergillus wentii is aerobic, able to grow, replicate, and produce metabolites optimally in an oxygen-rich environment. Under light exposure, Aspergillus wentii cultures have been observed to produce white aerial mycelium (at times expressing a pink hue) in large masses that can often expand to fit entire volumes of test tubes or culture plates. Aspergillus wentii mycelia have an 8-9 % glucosamine content and have an average doubling time of 4–8 hours in liquid culture.

Like many Aspergillus fungi, Aspergillus wentii is resistant to amphotericin B and itraconazole. Thermal death time for Aspergillus wentii occurs after 25 minutes at a temperature of 63 °C. Conditions of 100% oxygen pressurized at 10 atm will also cease A. wentii fungal growth.

=== Metabolism ===
Aspergillus wentii is able to produce a wide range of metabolites characteristic of mold fungi including kojic acid, 2-hydroxymethylfuran-5-carboxylic acid, and citric acid. Aspergillus wentii Wehmer is also capable of producing the plant-growth inhibitor metabolite 1-amino-2-nitrocyclopentane-1-carboxylic acid (ANPCA), known for its ability to stunt growth and cause deformation in plants such as Chrysanthemum, pea plants, and Nicotiana (tobacco) plants.

Aspergillus wentii strains produce numerous enzymes such as pectinases (in food sources), dextranase, lipases, cellulases, amylase, β-glucosidase and other common mold enzymes. Aspergillus wentii is a fungus capable of producing high quantities of lipase. Ideal lipase growth conditions in Aspergillus wentii (100% lipase activity) occur under media supplemented with glucose of pH 6.0 at a temperature of 30 °C. Aspergillus wentii grown in mannitol media produces the second largest lipase yield (with 84% lipase activity). Lipase activity for Aspergillus wentii grown on fructose media produces just under 50% lipase activity while media supplemented with galactose, sucrose, lactose or maltose all yielded moderate lipase activity (20–37%).

Aspergillus wentii strain NRRL 2001 spores were found to naturally produce glucose from hydrolyzing soluble starch. Of all Aspergilli, A. wentii was found to produce the best yields of glucose, able to convert approximately 20-40% of original starch, with almost zero maltose conversions. Optimal glucose production from Aspergillus wentii NRRL 2001's starch degradation occurred from younger spores (glucose production decrease with spore age), in the presence of Iodoacetate (a compound that blocks glucose breakdown pathways), and at a pH 3.0 or higher.

Toxins such as aflatoxin B1, aflatoxin B2 (in small traces), emodin and wentilacton are all made by Aspergillus wentii. Aspergillus wentii toxins are commonly found on plant, animal, or food sources. One intracellular metabolite secreted by Aspergillus wentii is toxic to mice as well as chicken embryos. Aspergillus wentii chloroform extracts of mycelium, moldy corn, and moldy rice all produce varying levels of toxicity when introduced to chicken embryos on yeast-extract sucrose (YES) medium. While moldy corn with Aspergillus wentii was unable to kill mice in one study, YES extracts of corn and mycelium were shown to be deadly to mice, with YES mycelium extract being the most potent to both chicken and mice.

One Aspergillus wentii strain, Ras101, is known for its ability to produce biodiesel from the transesterification of lipids. Optimal yield of biodiesel from Aspergillus wentii is dependent upon factors such as the optimization of lipid production, pH, incubation time, temperature, and the medium composition. Under ideal conditions, Aspergillus wentii can optimize 31.65% biomass of biodiesel in 30 minutes of lipid transesterification at 70 °C.

== Habitat and ecology ==
Aspergilli are collectively classified as indoor mold fungi. Aspergillus wentii is typically found as mold on various decomposing vegetable and organic material and is notorious for causing food spoilage in corns, cereals, ground nuts and peanuts. Aspergillus wentii can also be isolated from tobacco. As a common soil fungus and endosymbiont, Aspergillus wentii often lives in symbiosis with species in rhizospheres (an area of soil populated with roots and home to many microorganisms). Within these rhizospheres, Aspergillus wentii can be found amongst cottonseed, olives, barley, rice, pineapple, oats, Brazil nuts, pecans, groundnuts, wheat, fir tree leaf matter, and more. Not only limited to plant and vegetative sources, A. wentii has also been associated with bird and gerbil nests.

Distributed in many different parts of the world, Aspergillus wentii has been found in countries such as China, Peru, Argentina, Japan, South Africa, France, Pakistan, Guyana, Turkey, India, Spain, Italy, Israel, the Bahamas, the United States and more. Aspergillus wentii is most commonly found in warm, subtropical areas such as South America.

Aspergillus wentii has a tendency to colonize dry soils, especially in deserts and warm climates. However, A. wentii has been isolated from a variety of cultivated and uncultivated soil types including grassland soils, forest soils, clay isolated from caves and even alkaline soils. It is also common to find Aspergillus wentii near water sources such as in seawater, sediments of estuaries (partially enclosed coastal bodies), peat bogs, waste stabilization ponds, water treatment plants and in fresh water sources. In Hawaii, one study found that Aspergillus wentii only colonized roots of pineapple plants in regions with higher rainfall and lower soil pH. In addition to moist environments, Aspergillus wentii was also found to colonize dry plant stems of Coptis japonicus in soil. As an aerobic organism, Aspergillus wentii was cited as a rare, trivial component of spora found in the air in Europe.

== Disease ==
Until recently, Aspergillus wentii was not known to be pathogenic in humans. The first case of a human disease caused by Aspergillus wentii was reported in 2009. This disease was described as Necrotising external otitis (also known as NEO), a fungal infection characterized by severe ear pains. Prior to this report, NEO was known to be primarily caused by the bacteria Pseudomonas aeruginosa, although cases of other fungal-origin NEO infections were previously described. In both Pseudomonas and Aspergillus wentii NEO, immunocompromised patients are more susceptible to disease. However, unlike classical NEO caused by P. aeruginosa, that is commonly found in diabetic elderly, NEO of Aspergillus wentii origin can infect diabetic or non-diabetic adults anywhere between the ages of 20 and 85 years old. In more severe cases of NEO, paralysis symptoms in cranial nerve VII appear uniquely in cases of fungal infection, including NEO of Aspergillus wentii origin. Generally, amphotericin B and itraconazole are used as treatment of Aspergillus wentii infection.

== Uses ==
Widely used in the food industry, Aspergillus wentii is exploited for its ability to make enzymes (such as lipase) that create flavour byproducts in foods when degrading lipids. Aspergillus wentii is primarily used in Asian cuisines, often combined with other Aspergilli (such as Aspergillus oryzae and A. flavus) to create soy products through production of kojic acid and fermentation processes. Enzymes such as pectinase are also produced by Aspergillus wentii in several food sources such as salted fish, Chinese chestnuts, and popcorn. Like Aspergillus oryzae, A. tamarii and A. flavus, Aspergillus wentii can produce a wide range of mold enzymes. Proteolytic (protein degrading) enzymes, such as amylase, were also found to be produced by Aspergillus wentii when fermenting on cocoa beans.

Aspergillus wentii fungal strain, Aspergillus wentii Ras101, is known for its ability to produce biodiesel through a transesterification process. As a fungus that produces lipids in high quantities, Aspergillus wentii was proposed as a favourable microorganism to produce large yields of biodiesel product. Optimal yield of biodiesel from Aspergillus wentii is dependent upon factors such as the optimization of lipid production, pH, incubation time, temperature, and the medium composition. Under ideal conditions, Aspergillus wentii can optimize 31.65% biomass of biodiesel in 30 minutes of lipid transesterification at 70 °C. Physiological properties of Aspergillus wentii biodiesel (density, water content, calorific value, and viscosity) are comparable to standards of ordinary biodiesel and fossil fuel requirements as an alternative fuel source, making this strain a potential feedstock for producing biodiesel as a renewable, alternative fuel source in the industrial sector.
