= Ayam kecap =

Indonesian chicken dish

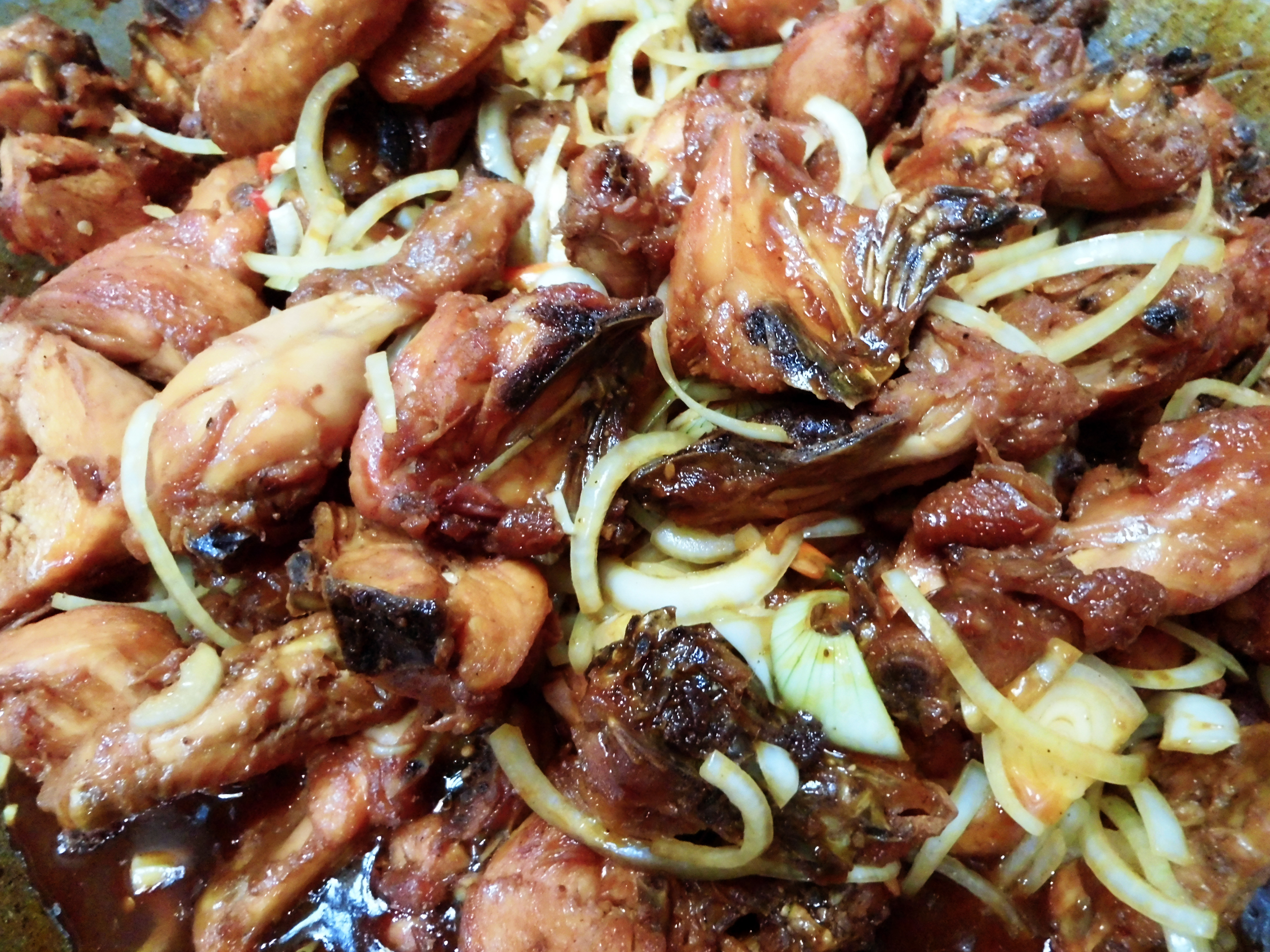
- Ayam kecap with slices of onion
- Alternative names: Ayam masak kicap
- Course: Main course
- Place of origin: Indonesia
- Region or state: Java
- Serving temperature: Hot
- Main ingredients: Chicken (cut into pieces), poached in sweet soy sauce and spices

Ayam kecap (Indonesian pronunciation: [ˌajam ˈket͡ʃap̚]) or ayam masak kicap (Malay pronunciation: [ˌajam ˌmasaʔ ˈkit͡ʃap̚]) is an Indonesian Javanese chicken dish poached or simmered in sweet soy sauce (kecap manis) commonly found in Indonesia and Malaysia.

== History and origin ==
Fried chicken in sweet soy sauce is a traditional chicken dish served across Indonesia. It is more precisely of Javanese-Chinese origin. The recipe follows the production of Indonesian kecap manis (sweet soy sauce). Historically, soy sauce production is linked to Chinese influence in the archipelago. However, the Indonesian Javanese version of soy sauce is distinguished by a generous addition of thick liquid palm sugar (gula jawa) with the consistency of molasses. Ayam kecap pedas is a spicier version which includes a generous amount of chili pepper.

== Regional variations ==
=== Indonesia ===
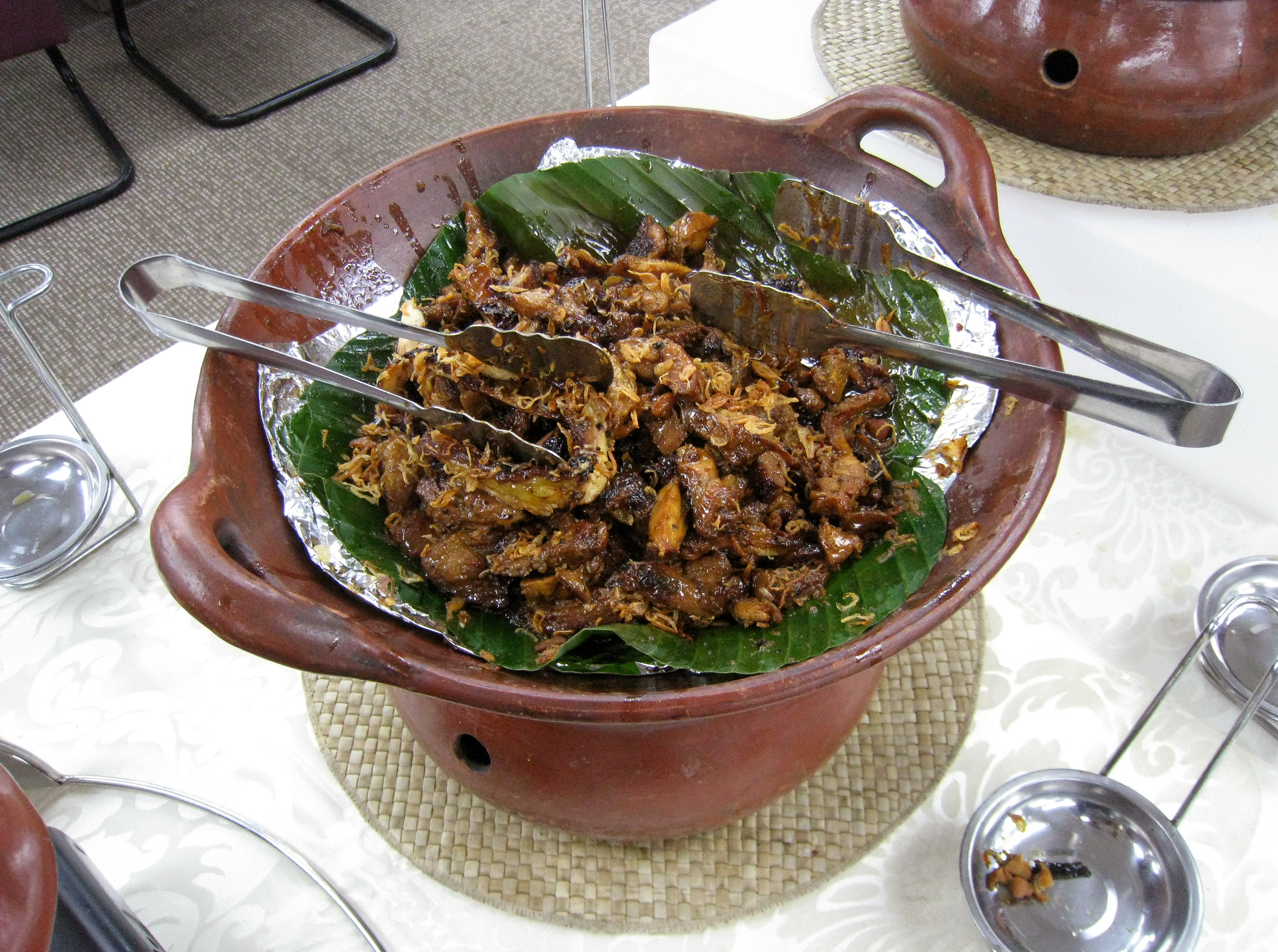
Ayam kecap panggang served in a buffet in Jakarta

In Indonesia, ayam kecap consists of pieces of chicken simmered in kecap manis (sweet soy sauce), spiced with shallot or onion, garlic, ginger, pepper, leek and tomato. Other versions may include richer spices, including nutmeg and cloves. In Indonesia, the term ayam kecap is often interchangeable with ayam goreng kecap (a variant of ayam goreng in sweet soy sauce) and semur ayam (Indonesian sweet soy stew which uses chicken instead of beef). These are all similar—if not almost identical—recipes of chicken cooked in sweet soy sauce. However, recipes for semur ayam often call for richer spices, such as cloves, cinnamon, and star anise. Ayam goreng kecap has thicker sweet soy sauce and is often served with slices of fresh lime or a splash of lime juice. The main difference is probably its water content: while remaining moist, both ayam kecap and ayam goreng kecap are typically drier and utilise thicker soy sauce than more watery semur ayam.

Ayam kecap commonly uses poached chicken cut into pieces, including the bones. A variant called ayam panggang kecap uses identical sweet soy sauce and spices, but uses boneless chicken fillets that are grilled instead of fried.

=== Malaysia ===
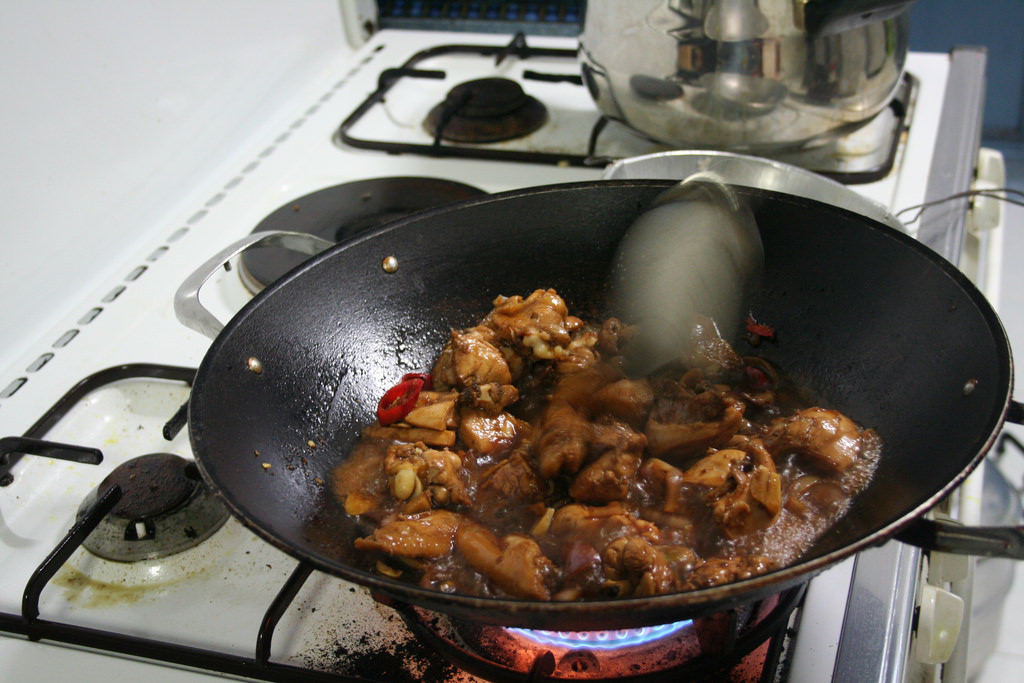
Ayam masak kicap being cooked

The Malay ayam masak kicap (lit. "chicken cooked in soy sauce") is different from the Chinese version of soy sauce chicken, as the chicken meat is cut into pieces and mixed with locally distinct spices. Malaysian ayam masak kicap usually includes spices similar to its Indonesian counterpart. Malaysian-style ayam masak kicap is usually par-fried first as ayam goreng kunyit (turmeric fried chicken) before being simmered. It can also include potatoes in the stew.

== See also ==
- Adobo - a similar dish from the Philippines
- Ayam bakar
- Ayam taliwang
- Babi kecap
- Satay
- List of chicken dishes
