= Ayam bumbu rujak =

Indonesian traditional chicken dish

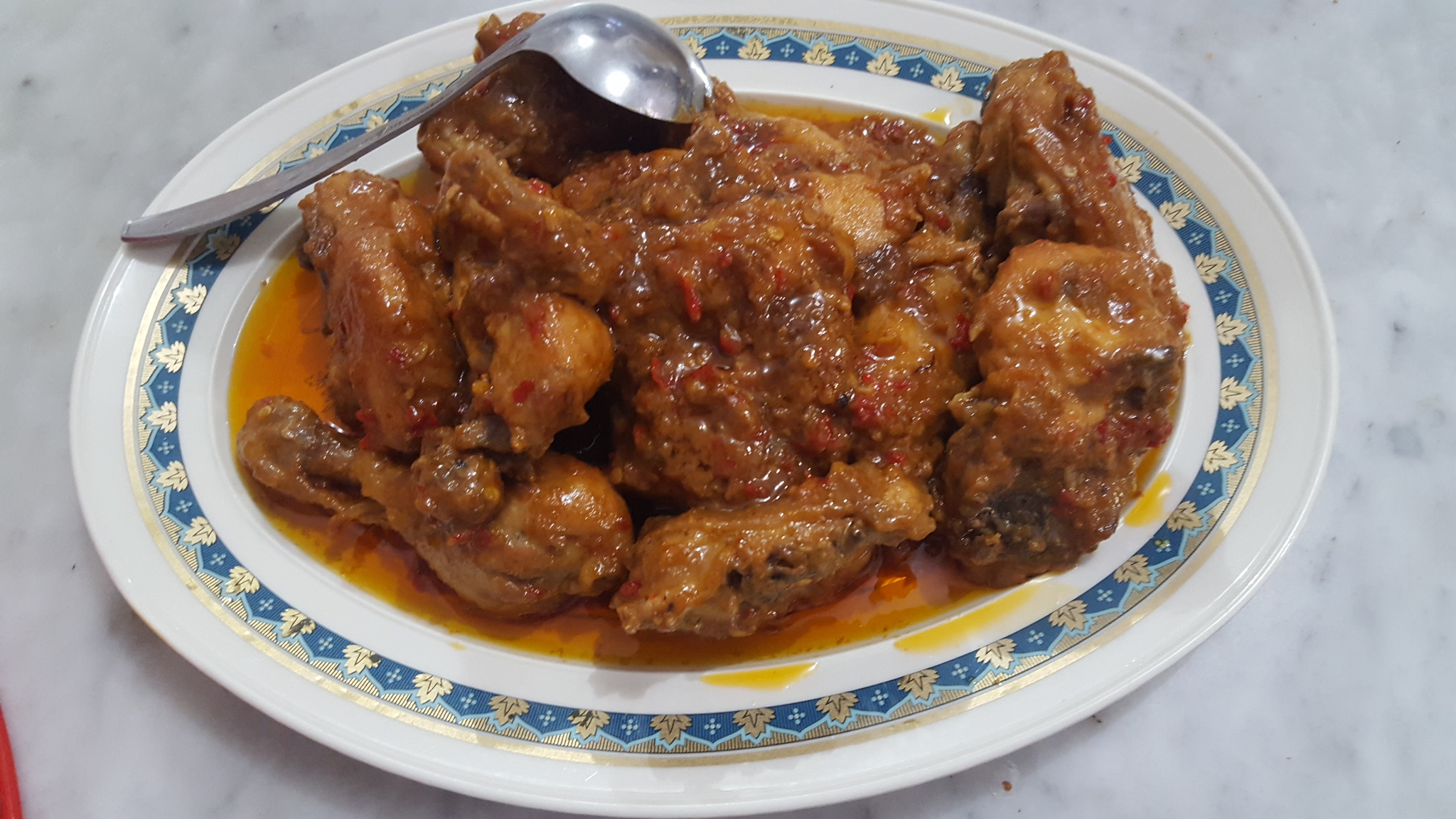
- Ayam bumbu rujak
- Course: Main course
- Place of origin: Indonesia
- Region or state: Java
- Serving temperature: Hot
- Main ingredients: chicken, spicy seasoning

Ayam bumbu rujak (Indonesian pronunciation: [ˌajam ˌbumbu ˈrud͡ʒaʔ]) is a typical Indonesian Javanese food made from chicken meat which is still young and uses a red basic spice then grilled. A red base is a spice made from salt, garlic, onion, and red chili. Called seasoning rujak because there are many spices besides chili, including brown sugar which is commonly used in fruit rojak sauce. Ayam bumbu rujak often called ayam bakar bumbu rujak since it is grilled (Indonesian: bakar), thus often regarded as one variant of various ayam bakar recipes.

Rujak seasoning can be used not only for chicken, but also for grilled fish, grilled duck, and others. Ayam bumbu rujak originates from East Java. Its popularity has grown to various regions in Indonesia and has become favorite food for many people and circles. After processing, rujak seasoning becomes spicy, savoury and sweet, producing a unique taste in chicken dishes.

== See also ==
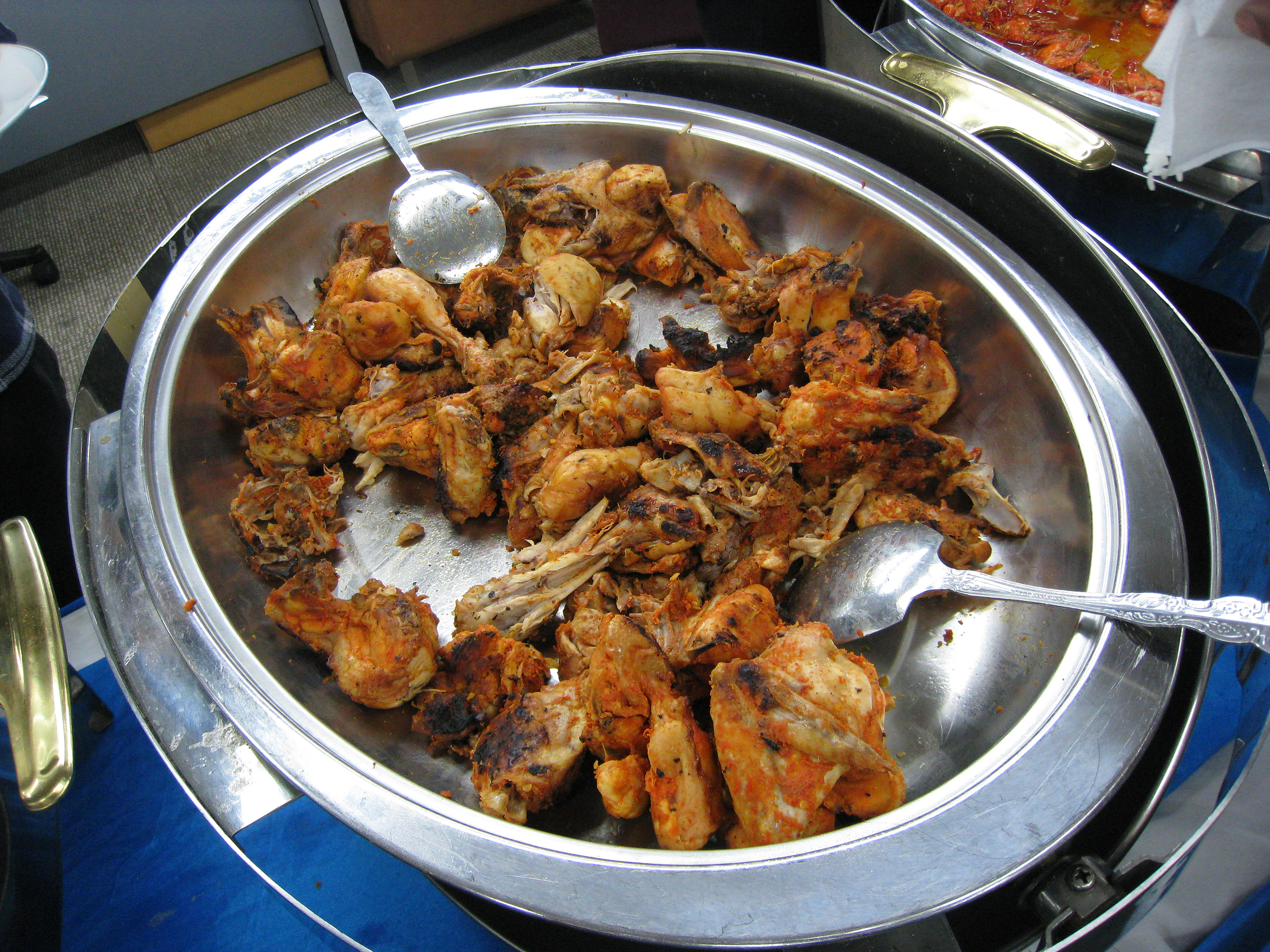
Ayam bakar bumbu rujak, served in a buffet

- Ayam kecap
- Ayam taliwang
- Ayam bakar
- Ayam goreng
