= Babi hong =

Chinese Indonesian braised pork dish

Babi Hong
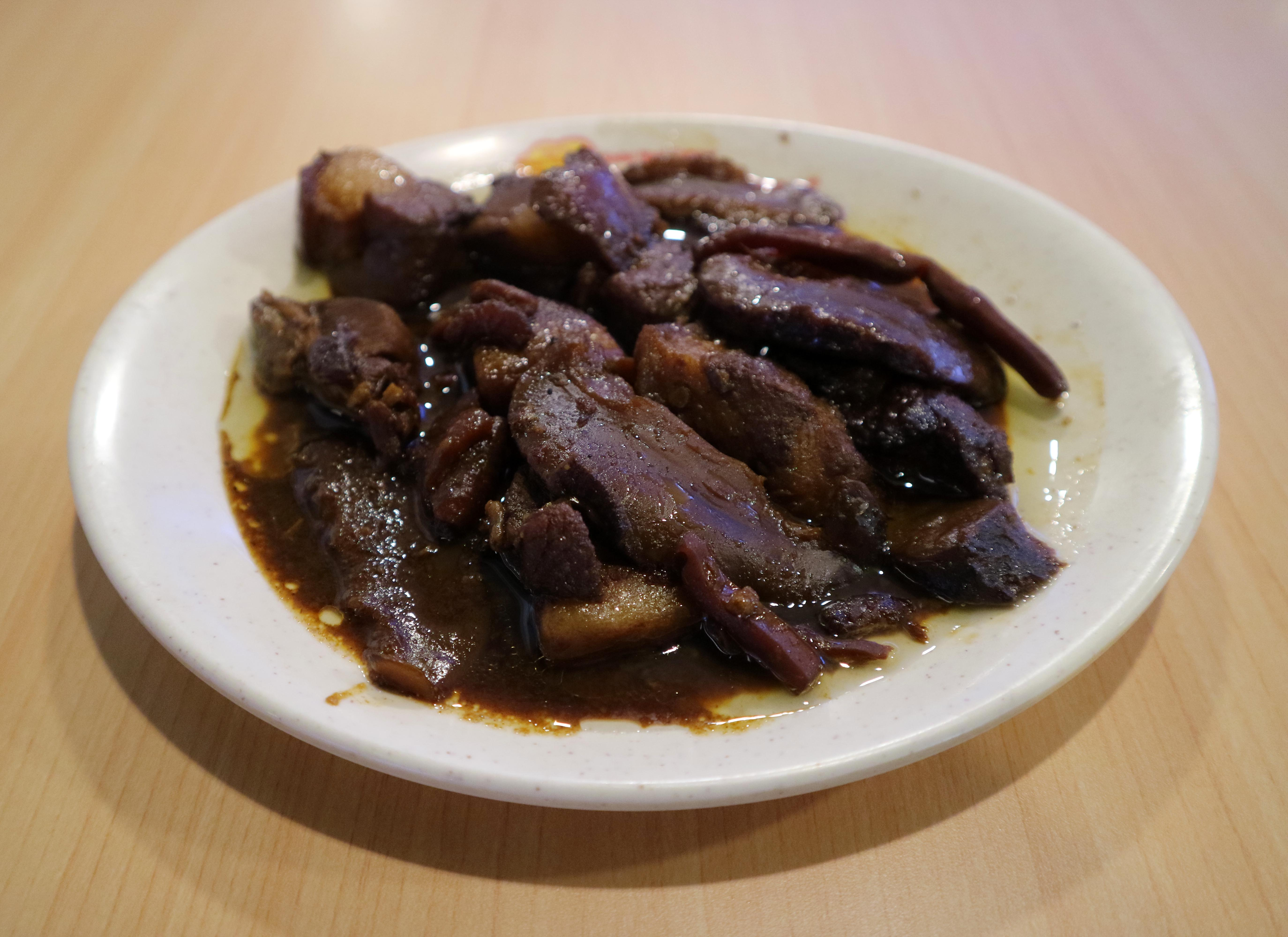
- Babi hong, a Chinese Indonesian pork belly dish in Chinese sauces and seasonings.
- Course: Main course
- Place of origin: Indonesia
- Region or state: Chinatowns in Indonesia
- Created by: Chinese Indonesians
- Serving temperature: Hot
- Main ingredients: Pork belly braised in soy sauce, garlic and Chinese sauces
- Similar dishes: Babi kecap, red braised pork belly

Babi hong is a Chinese Indonesian pork belly dish possibly of Hakka origin. The samcan or pork belly is boiled or braised, fried and steamed in numbers of Chinese seasonings and sauces.

Babi hong is often offered in Chinese Indonesian restaurants, especially in Chinese towns in Indonesian cities. Traditionally this dish is considered as a special dish to be served to guests and family during special occasion such as imlek (Chinese New Year).

Babi hong is quite similar to other Chinese Indonesian pork dish – babi kecap (pork braised in soy sauce), although babi kecap is a much simpler dish. It is quite similar – possibly related to Hakka dish kiu nyuk and mainland Chinese pork belly dish hong shao rou.

== Ingredients ==
The main ingredient is samcan or pork belly meat, hioko or shiitake mushroom, sayur asin or dried salted mustard greens, with garlic, ginger, salt, sugar, pepper, and ngohiong or five-spice powder. For seasoning this dish uses three types of soy sauces; common salty soy sauce, kecap manis (sweet soy sauce), and kecap jamur (black mushroom soy sauce). It also uses angciu (Chinese red cooking wine) and oyster sauce. The pork belly actually must undergo three stages or three types of cooking methods; including boiling or braising, frying in oil, and steaming.

== See also ==
- Babi kecap
- Babi panggang
- Sekba
