= Babi kecap =

Indonesian braised pork dish

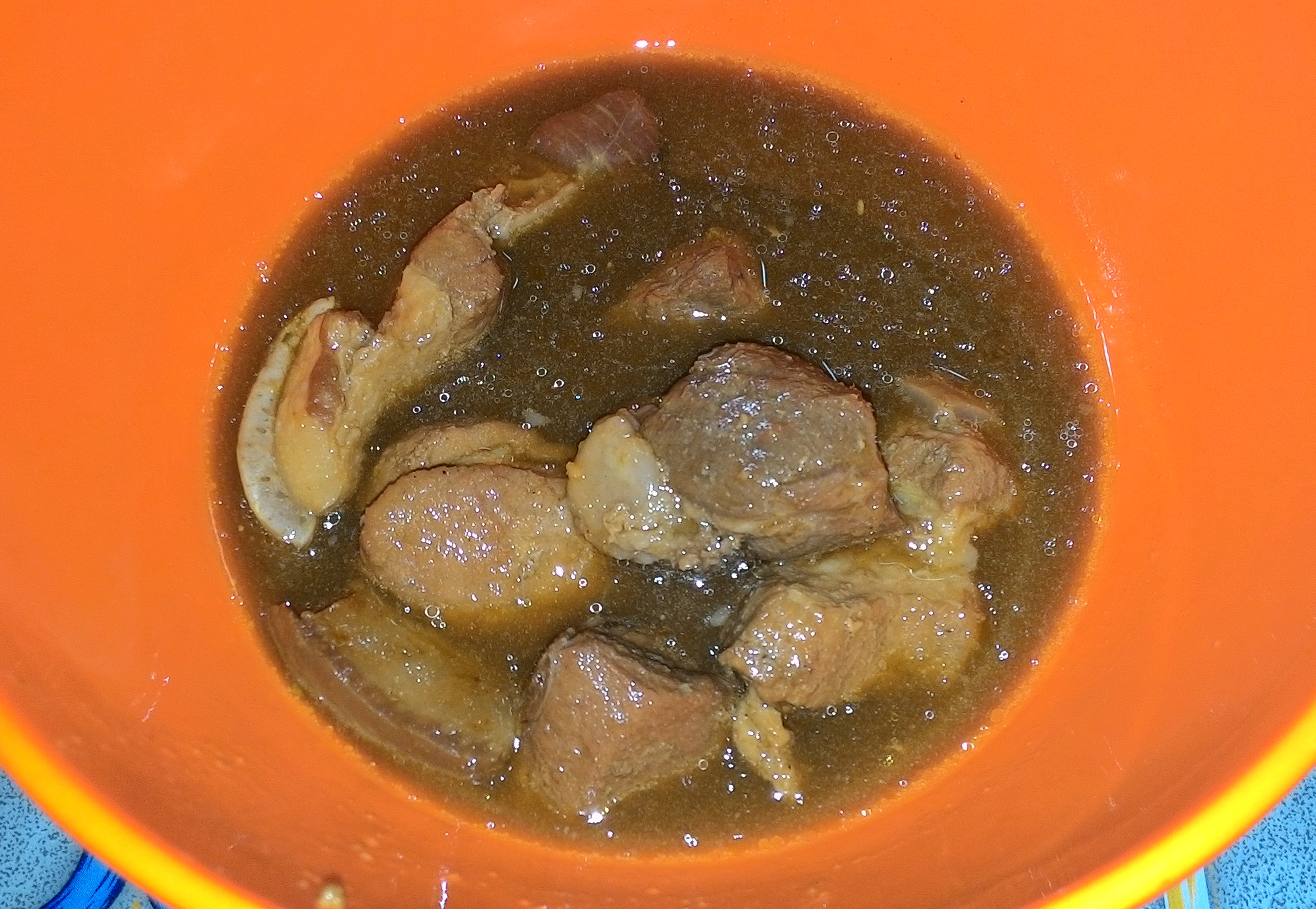
- Babi kecap, Chinese Indonesian pork braised in sweet soy sauce
- Alternative names: Babi ketjap (Dutch)
- Course: Main course
- Place of origin: Indonesia
- Region or state: Southeast Asia
- Serving temperature: Hot
- Main ingredients: Pork and vegetables simmered in kecap manis (sweet soy sauce) spiced with garlic and shallot
- Variations: Semur

Babi kecap is an Indonesian braised pork with sweet soy sauce (kecap manis). It is a Chinese Indonesian classic, due to its simplicity and popularity among Chinese Indonesian households. It is also popular among non-Muslim Indonesians, such as the Balinese, Ambonese, Bataks, Minahasans, and Dayaks, and in the Netherlands among the Indo-Dutch, where it is known as babi ketjap, owing to colonial ties with Indonesia. In the Netherlands, the dish might also be served within an opulent rijsttafel banquet.

The dish is believed to be based on Southern Chinese braised pork in soy sauce know in Indonesia as babi taotjo without the taotjo because of its unavailability in the past. However, it is more Indonesian in nature, because of the mild sweetness introduced by Indonesian kecap manis (sweet soy sauce). It is sometimes prepared with a sweet chili sauce.

In Bali, babi kecap is consumed at festivals such as Galungan and Nyepi.

== Ingredients ==
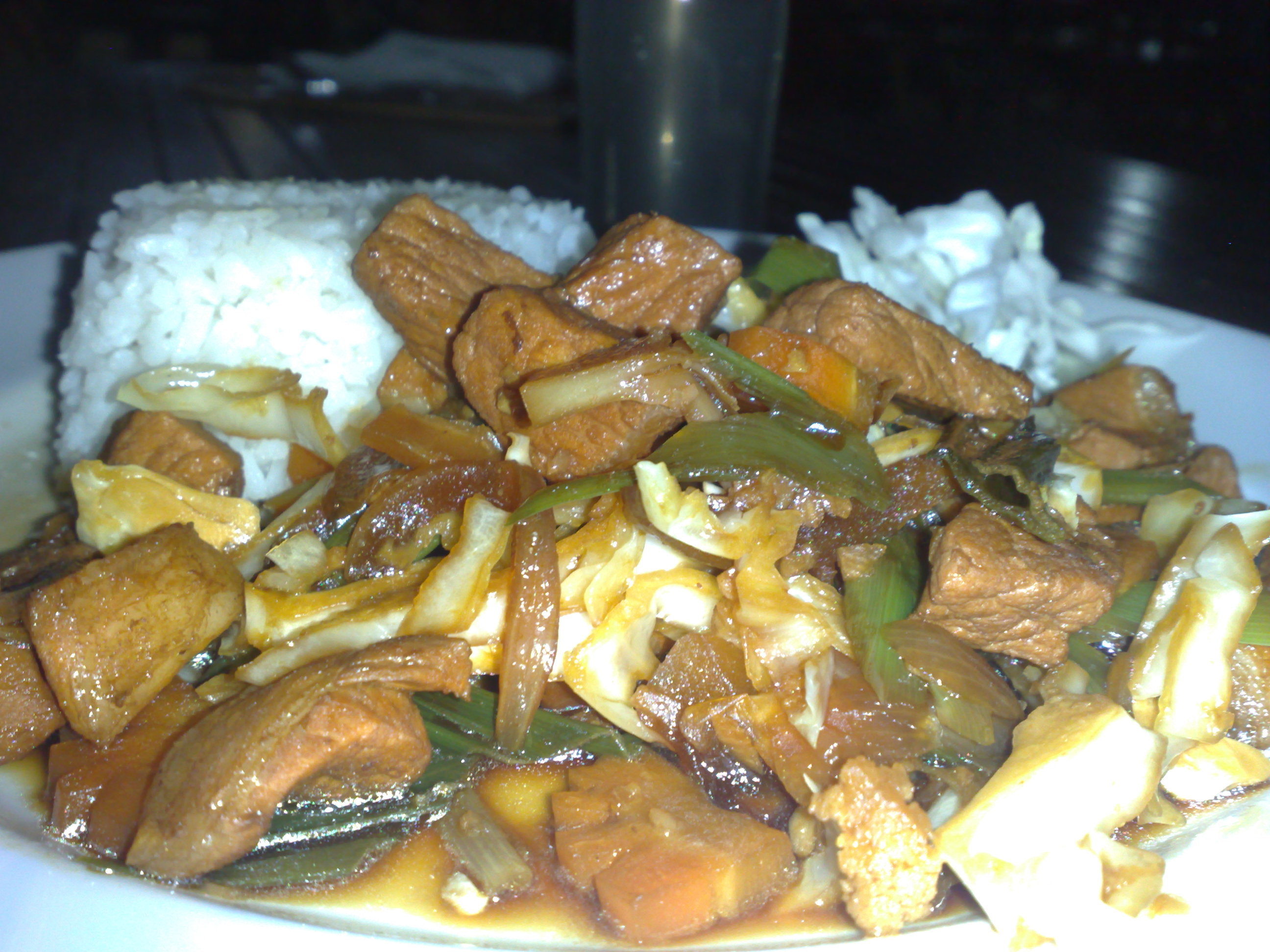
Babi kecap with vegetables and rice

The basic recipe, commonly used by Chinese Indonesians in their households, usually requires cuts of pork belly simmered with sweet soy sauce, spiced with garlic, shallot or onion, and a dash of salt. The popular recipes employed elsewhere — from restaurants in Chinatown in Indonesia to Bali and the Netherlands, may include additional ingredients, such as lemongrass, ginger, tomato, shrimp paste, salam leaf (Indonesian bay leaf), white pepper, and red chilies. If sweet soy sauce is not available, it can be substituted with normal soy sauce mixed with ground palm sugar or brown sugar. The less hot and spicy sweet pepper may be used to replace red chilies.

== Variations ==
Pork belly is usually the preferred cut of pork meat for babi kecap. However, other cuts of pork meat or offal may also be used in similar soy sauce-based recipes. Derivatives of this recipe that substitute the use of pork belly include sengkel babi kecap, which uses pig trotters, and sekba, which is a Chinese Indonesian pork offal stew that may also include pork liver, nose, tongue, ear, tripe, and intestines.

== Similar dishes ==
It is very similar to another Indonesian favorite called semur daging, although semur is usually made of beef and potatoes with slightly different spices. The chicken variant is called ayam kecap or Kip Smoor in Dutch. The word semur is a corruption of the Dutch word smoor (smoren is to braise in Dutch). Originally Indonesian semur dishes are heated in butter instead of oil hinting at a Dutch origine. Smoor can also be found in former Dutch colonies Sri Lanka and Malacca.

== See also ==
- Ayam kecap
- Babi hong
- List of stews
- List of pork dishes
- Semur
