= Sweet soy sauce =

Sweetened aromatic soy sauce, originating from Java, Indonesia

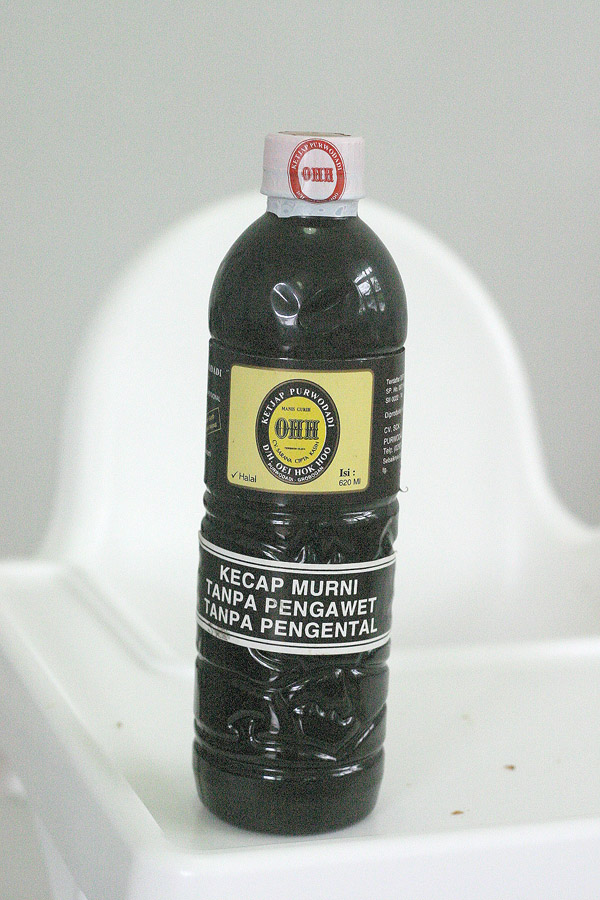
- A bottle of Indonesian kecap manis
- Alternative names: Kecap manis
- Type: Cooking sauce and condiment
- Place of origin: Indonesia
- Region or state: Java
- Created by: Indonesians
- Main ingredients: Fermented soy sweetened with palm sugar molasses
- Variations: Soy sauce, mild sweet soy sauce

Sweet soy sauce (Indonesian: kecap manis; Indonesian pronunciation: [ˌket͡ʃap̚ ˈmanɪs]) is a sweetened aromatic soy sauce, originating in Indonesia, which has a darker color, a viscous syrupy consistency, and a molasses-like flavor due to the generous addition of palm sugar or jaggery. Kecap manis is widely used with satay. It is similar to, though finer in flavor than, Chinese Tianmian sauce (tianmianjiang). It is by far the most commonly employed type of soy sauce in Indonesian cuisine and accounts for an estimated 90 percent of the nation's total soy sauce production.

== Ingredients ==
Compared to kecap asin, the mildly salty regular soy sauce, sweet soy sauce has a slightly thicker consistency and tastes much sweeter. This condiment is made from a fermented paste of boiled black soybeans, roasted grain, brine, and Aspergillus wentii mold, to which palm sugar is added. The strong sweet taste is contributed by a generous amount of palm sugar; the sauce may contain up to 50 percent gula merah or gula jawa (palm sugar jaggery). Indonesian sweet soy sauce is often enriched with spices, including star anise, cinnamon, black pepper, coriander, and clove.

== Uses ==
Kecap manis is an essential sauce in the Indonesian pantry. It is used to add a pleasantly mild sweet and umami flavor to most common Indonesian dishes, including nasi goreng, mie goreng, kwetiau goreng, ayam kecap (roasted chicken), babi kecap (braised pork), semur beef stew, and ketoprak. It is also a popular marinade for grilled dishes, such as satay, ayam bakar (grilled chicken), and ikan bakar (grilled fish). Sweet soy sauce is also the basis for a common dipping sauce when mixed with chopped shallot and bird's eye chili and served alongside tahu goreng (fried tofu). Steamed rice topped with fried egg and drizzled with sweet soy sauce was a common meal among Indonesians in the 1990s and 2000s, especially children. In Eastern Indonesia, sweet soy sauce is used as the ingredient of colo-colo dipping sauce, although traditionally this Maluku sauce uses black-colored rendered coconut oil residue.

Various sweet soy sauce recipes

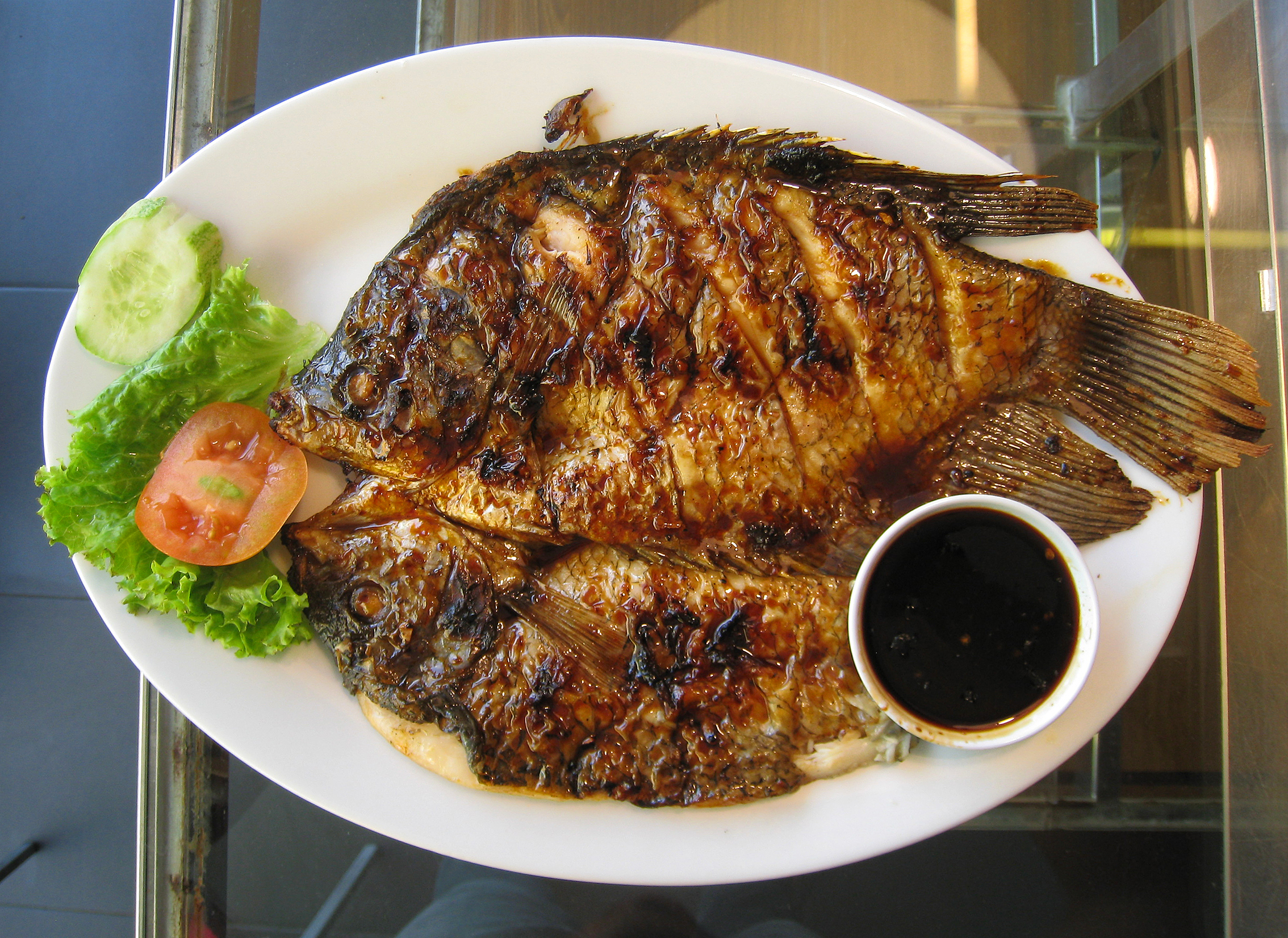
Gurame bakar (grilled gourami) served with sweet soy sauce as both marinade and dipping sauce

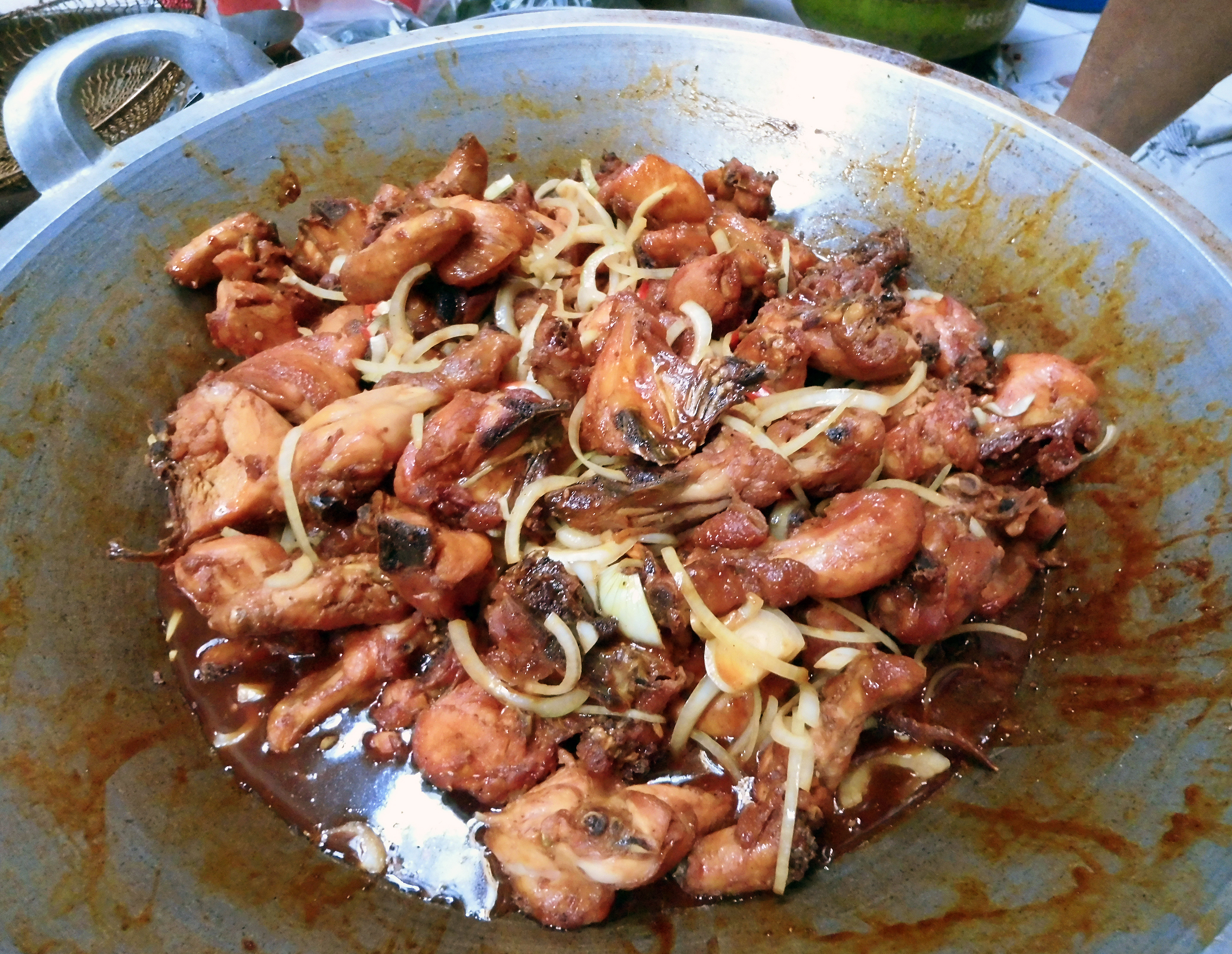
Ayam kecap, chicken poached in sweet soy sauce

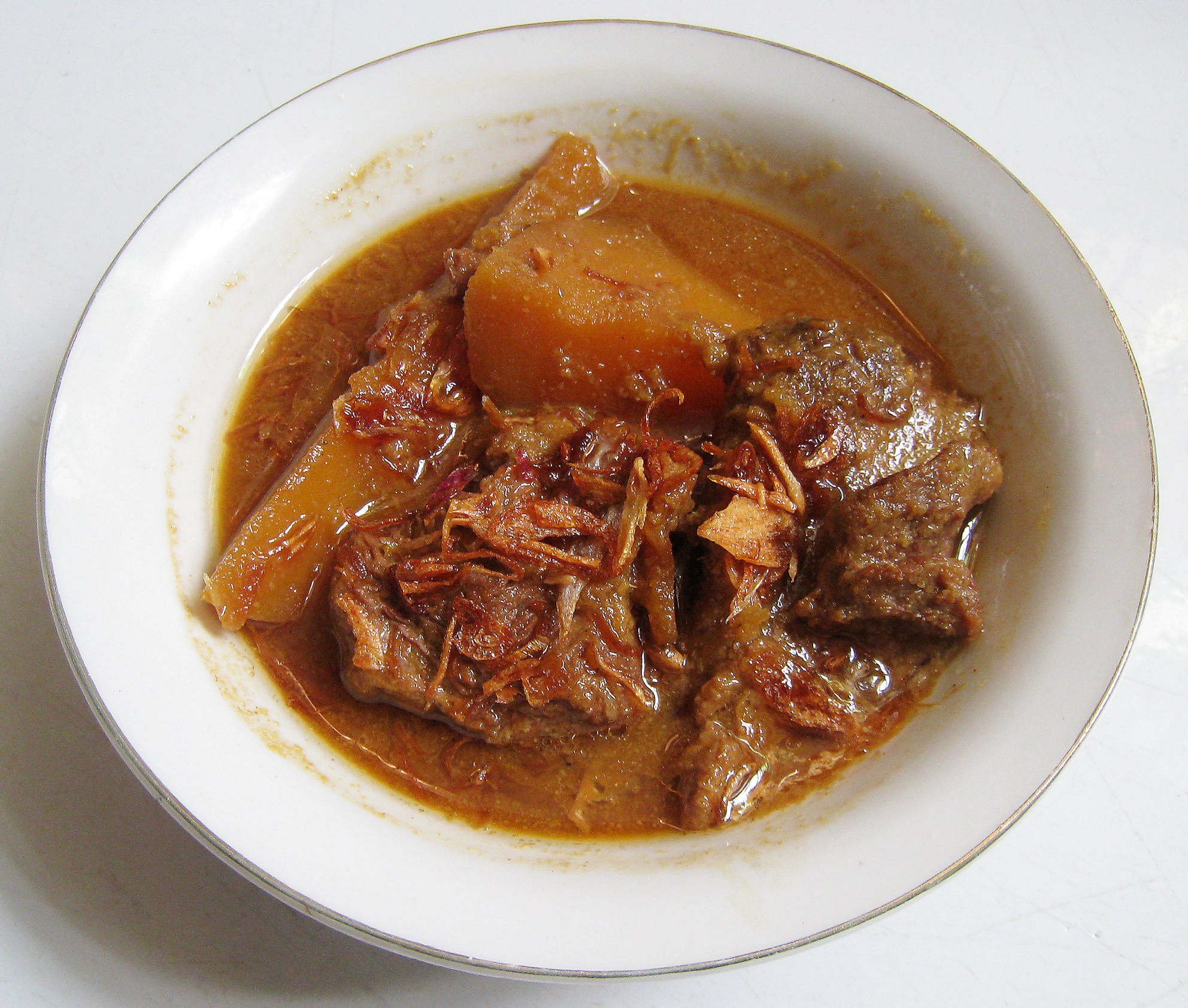
Semur daging, beef and potato stew in sweet soy sauce

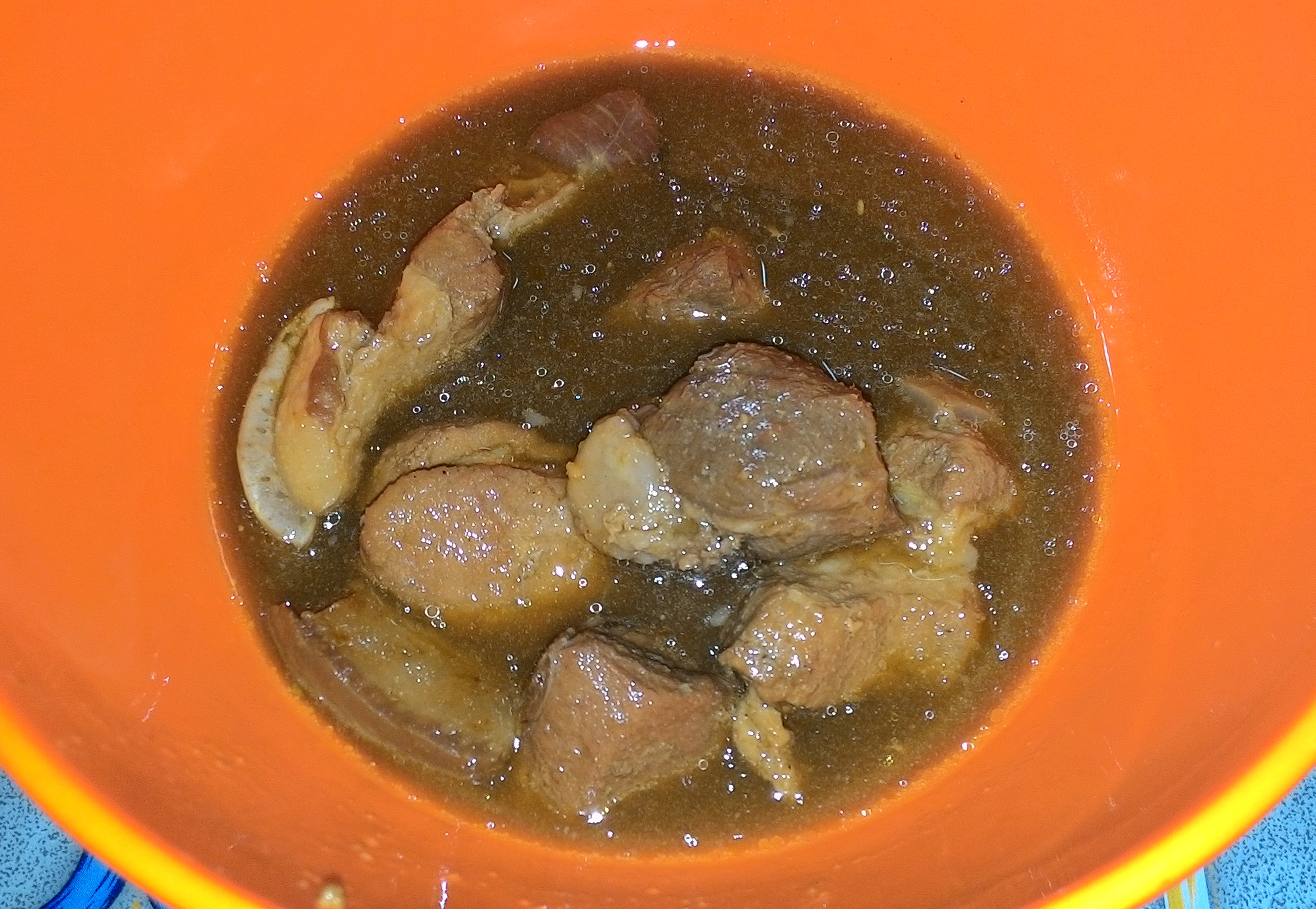
Babi kecap, pork simmered in sweet soy sauce

== Brands ==
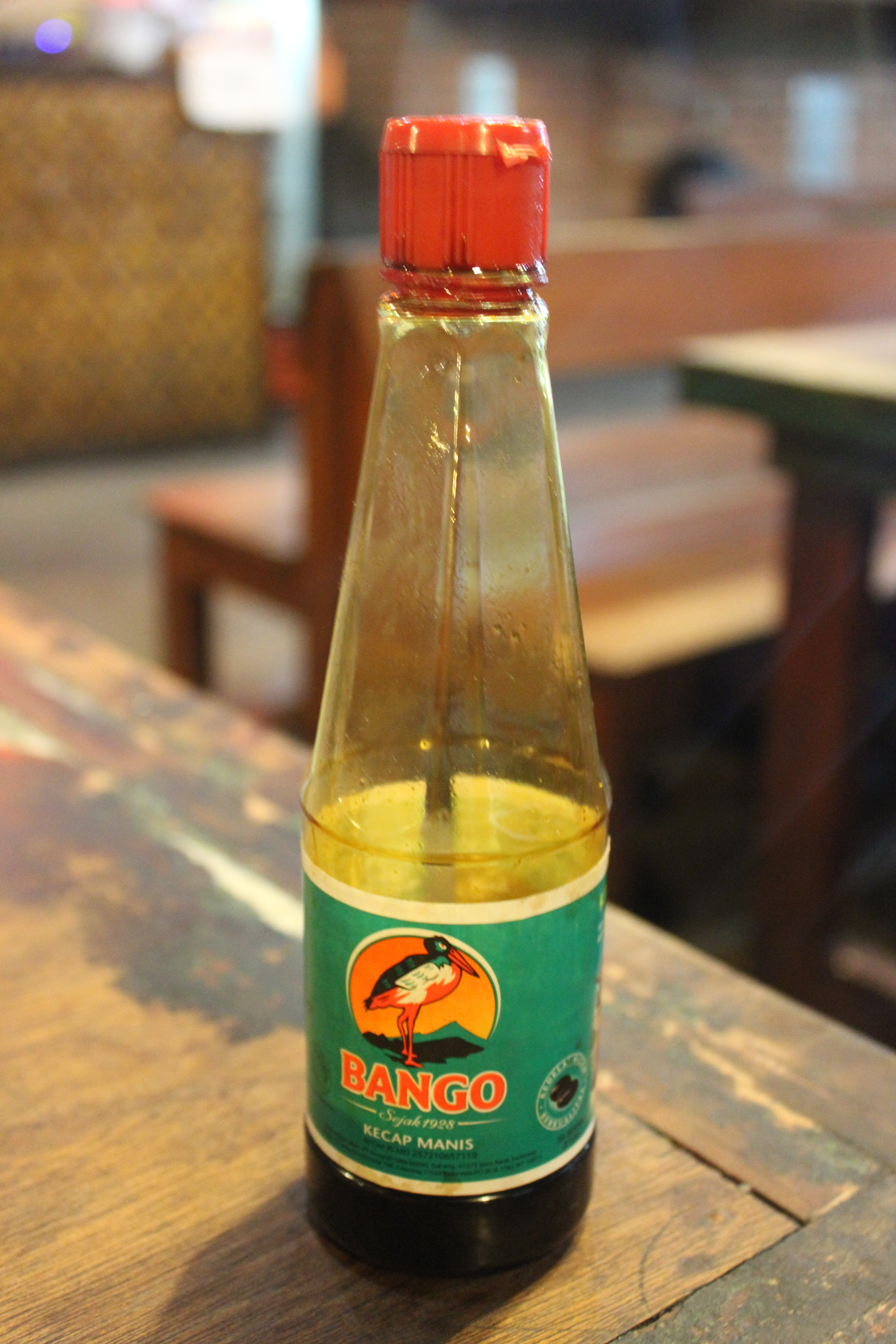
Bango brand, one of the most widely used kecap manis brands in Indonesia.

There are a wide variety of sweet soy sauce brands in Indonesia. Kecap manis is traditionally a small-scale home industry. However, a handful of brands are widely distributed throughout Indonesia and regionally, such as kecap manis ABC, Kecap Bango, Indofood, and Sedaap.

Besides the national brands, there are numerous regional brands, such as Ikan Lele in Pati, Mirama in Semarang, Orang Jual Sate in Probolinggo, Siong Hin (SH) in Tangerang, Tomat Lombok in Tegal, etc. More or less, there are a hundred regional brands of kecap manis.

Some brands distribute widely in the Netherlands like Conimex, Inproba, Kaki Tiga, and "A" Trade Mark.

== Substitutes ==
Sweet soy sauce is widely available in Indonesian marketplaces, warungs, minimarkets, supermarkets, toko, and Asian grocery stores worldwide. However, it is difficult to find in most parts of Europe (except for the Netherlands, Belgium, Luxembourg, UK, France and Germany) and also scarce in the Americas. Sweet soy sauce can be made from regular soy sauce. Regular soy sauce mixed with brown sugar, with a trace of molasses added, can serve as a substitute for sweet soy sauce.

== See also ==
- Dark soy sauce
- Ketchup
- List of condiments
- List of fermented soy products
- List of sauces
- Soup soy sauce
- Sweet bean sauce
- Teriyaki sauce
