= Rijsttafel =

Indonesian rice table buffet

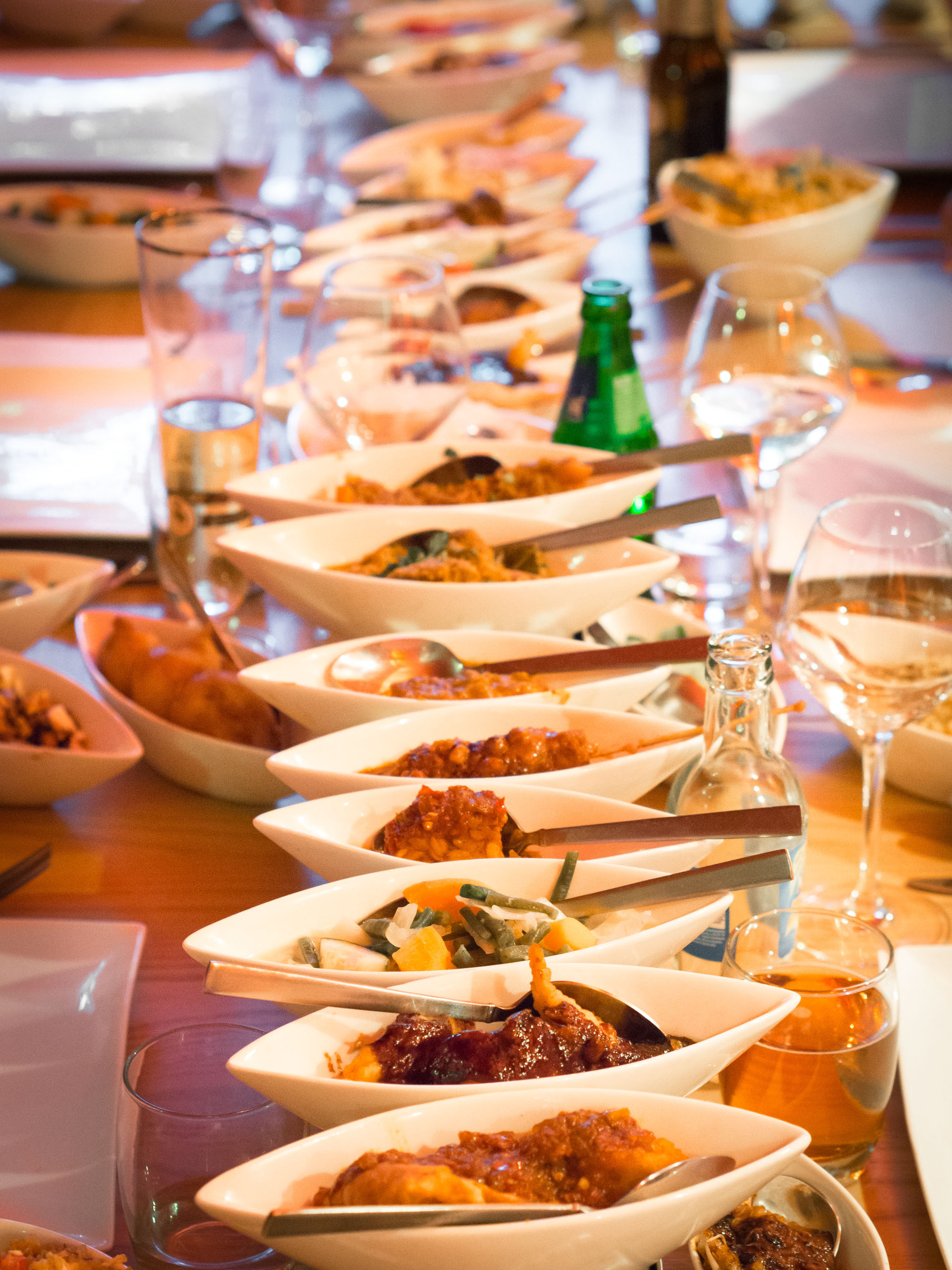
- An elaborate rijsttafel in a restaurant in The Hague, Netherlands
- Alternative names: Rice table
- Course: Main course
- Place of origin: Indonesia
- Region or state: Indonesia, Netherlands and Belgium
- Serving temperature: Hot or room temperature
- Main ingredients: Rice with various side dishes
- Variations: nasi campur, nasi rames (Indo)
- Other information: It is more a lavish banquet than a dish, popular in the Netherlands

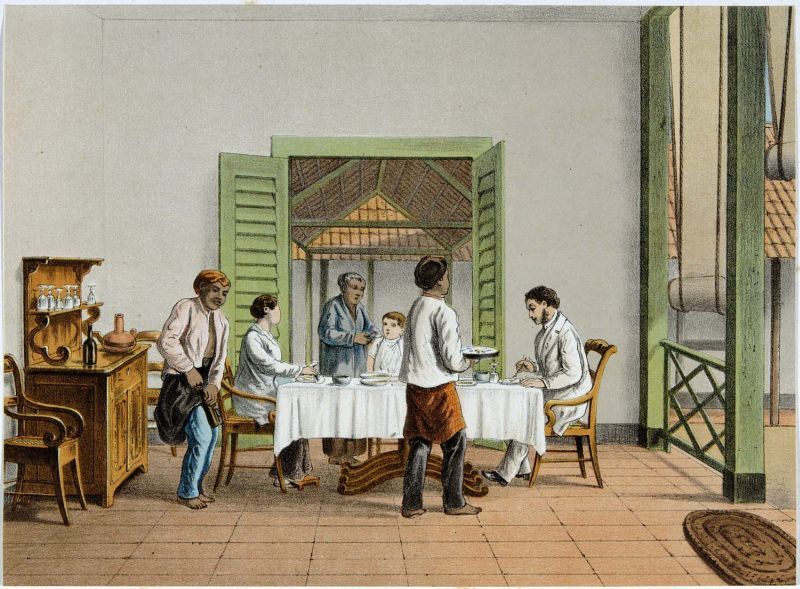
Rijsttafel in the 1880s

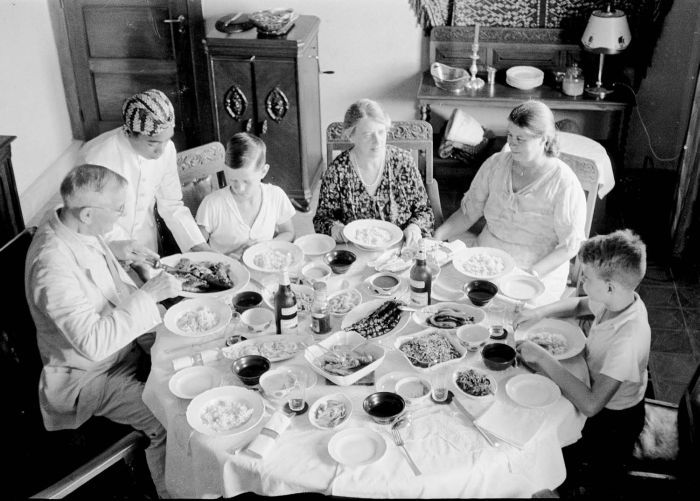
Rijsttafel in Bandung in 1936

Rijsttafel (/ˈraɪstɑːfəl/ RY-stah-fəl, Dutch: [ˈrɛistaːfəl] literally "rice table") is an elaborate Indonesian meal adapted by the Dutch from the hidang presentation of nasi padang from the Padang region of West Sumatra. It consists of many (forty is not an unusual number) side dishes in small portions, accompanied by rice prepared in several different ways. Popular side dishes include egg rolls, sambals, satay, fish, fruit, vegetables, pickles, and nuts. In most areas where it is served, such as the Netherlands and other areas of strong Dutch influence (such as parts of the West Indies), it is known by its Dutch name.

Although the dishes served are undoubtedly Indonesian, the rijsttafel’s origins were colonial. The Dutch introduced the rice table to both enjoy a wide array of dishes at a single sitting, and it to impress visitors with the exotic abundance of their colonial empire.

Rijsttafels strive to feature a range of not only flavours, colours, and degrees of spiciness, but also textures – an aspect rarely discussed in Western gastronomy but a common consideration in Asian cuisines. Such textures may include crispy, chewy, slippery, soft, hard, velvety, gelatinous, and runny.

== History ==
The rijsttafel was created as a festive and official banquet meant to show the multi-ethnic nature of the then-Dutch East Indies. Dishes were assembled from many far-flung regions where different cuisines exist, often particular to some of the over 300 ethnolinguistic and cultural groups on an island or island group — from Javanese favourite sateh, tempeh and seroendeng, to vegetarian cuisine gado-gado and lodeh with sambal lalab from Batavia and Preanger, spicy rendang and gulai curry from the Minangkabau lands in Sumatra, to ubiquitous East Indies dishes nasi goreng, soto ayam, and kroepoek crackers. Also included were Indonesian dishes with hybrid influence, such as Chinese babi ketjap, loempia, and bami to European beef smoor.

During its centuries of popularity in Dutch East Indies, lines of servants or sarong-clad waitresses ceremoniously served the marathon meal on platters laden with steaming bowls of fragrant foods. The first to be served was a cone-shaped pile of rice on a large platter, placed in the center of the table. The servers then surrounded the rice platter with as many as 40 small bowls holding meat and vegetable dishes, as well as condiments. During its colonial heyday until the Japanese occupation of the Dutch East Indies in 1942, the most celebrated rijsttafel in the colony were served for Sunday luncheon at the Hotel des Indes in Batavia and the Savoy Homann Hotel in Bandung, where the rice was accompanied by up to sixty different dishes.

Brought back to the Netherlands by former colonials, exiled Indonesians, and Indo-Europeans (Eurasians) after Indonesia gained independence in 1945, the rijsttafel was predominantly popular with Dutch families of colonial origin. At the same time, Indonesian nationalism promoted rejection of Dutch colonial culture and customs, including the flamboyant rice table. Today, the rice table format has practically disappeared from Indonesia's restaurants and is found in only a handful of fine-dining establishments in the country. A typical rijsttafel will have several tables laden with different dishes; in some elaborate settings in Indonesia, each dish may be served by a separate waitress.

Since about 1990, Indonesian food has become part of a mainstream interest in Southeast Asian cuisine, and there has been a proliferation of Indonesian restaurants in the Netherlands.

== Typical dishes ==
The following is a brief, albeit not exhaustive, list of foods which may be served in a rijsttafel:

- Acar – pickled vegetables
- Babi kecap – pork belly braised in sweet soy sauce common in the Netherlands; Indonesia has a halal version using a beef variant known as semur
- Babi panggang – roast pork in a tomato-based sauce
- Bebek betutu – duck roasted in banana leaves
- Bebek Peking – Chinese-style roast duck
- Capcay – stir-fried vegetables
- Empal gentong – curry-like beef soup
- Gado-gado – vegetables (cooked or fresh) with peanut sauce (sambal kacang)
- Gudeg – young jackfruit with palm sugar and coconut milk
- Karedok – vegetable salad in peanut sauce
- Krupuk – chips
- Lemper – rice rolls with spicy filling
- Lumpia – spring rolls
- Nasi goreng – fried rice
- Nasi kuning – Indonesian yellow rice
- Nasi uduk – Javanese steamed rice in coconut milk
- Opor ayam – chicken coconut curry
- Pecel – vegetable salad in peanut sauce
- Perkedel – meat and potato patties
- Pisang goreng – banana fritters
- Rawon – beef soup blackened with keluak
- Rendang – aromatic and spicy caramelised beef, braised in coconut milk, chillies, and spices
- Sambal iris – onion, tomato, and chilli paste
- Sambal kacang – peanut sauce
- Sambal ulek – spicy chilli paste
- Satay (also spelled saté, sate, or sateh) – various thinly sliced meats, marinated, then broiled on a skewer; variants are sate ayam (chicken); sate babi (pork); sate lilit (seafood)
- Sayur lodeh – spicy vegetable stew in coconut milk
- Semur daging – a stew of beef braised in sweet soy sauce stew
- Serundeng – peanuts with sautéed shredded coconut
- Tahu telur – tofu omelette
- Telur balado – hardboiled eggs sautéed in chilli sauce
- Telur bumbu Bali – hardboiled eggs sautéed in a Balinese spice mixture

== Today ==
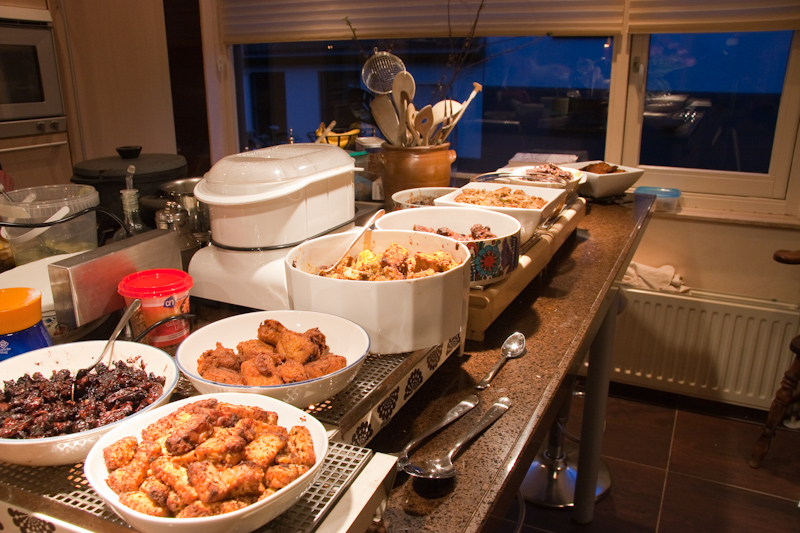
A contemporary rijsttafel served in Rotterdam, Netherlands

Despite its popularity in the Netherlands and abroad, the rijsttafel is rarely found in Indonesia. This is due to most Indonesian meals consist of rice accompanied by only one to three dishes, mostly consisting of lauk (fish, chicken, meat, egg, or other source of protein), sayur (vegetable), and other side dishes. To consume more than that number of dishes at once (as a rijsttafel might have from seven to forty dishes) is considered too extravagant and expensive. The closest versions to rice table dishes readily available in Indonesia are local nasi Padang and nasi campur. However, in Indonesian restaurants around the world, especially in Belgium, the Netherlands, and South Africa, the rijsttafel is still popular.

In Indonesia, only a handful of dining establishments ceremoniously serve elaborate colonial-style rijsttafel, such as select upscale restaurants mainly in Jakarta. In July 2011, Indonesian flag carrier Garuda Indonesia began serving Indonesian rijsttafel in Executive Class as its signature, in-flight service. This presentation format was meant to introduce passengers to the diversity of Indonesian cuisine in a single setting as part of Garuda Indonesia experience. The in-flight Indonesian rijsttafel includes nasi kuning or regular steamed rice, accompanied with a choice of dishes such as satay, rendang, gado-gado, grilled chicken rica, red snapper in yellow acar sauce, fried shrimp in sambal, potato perkedel and tempeh, along with kerupuk or rempeyek crackers.

== See also ==
- List of rice dishes
- Smorgasbord – Buffet-style meal of Swedish origin
