= Ayam bakar =

Indonesian and Malay style grilled chicken

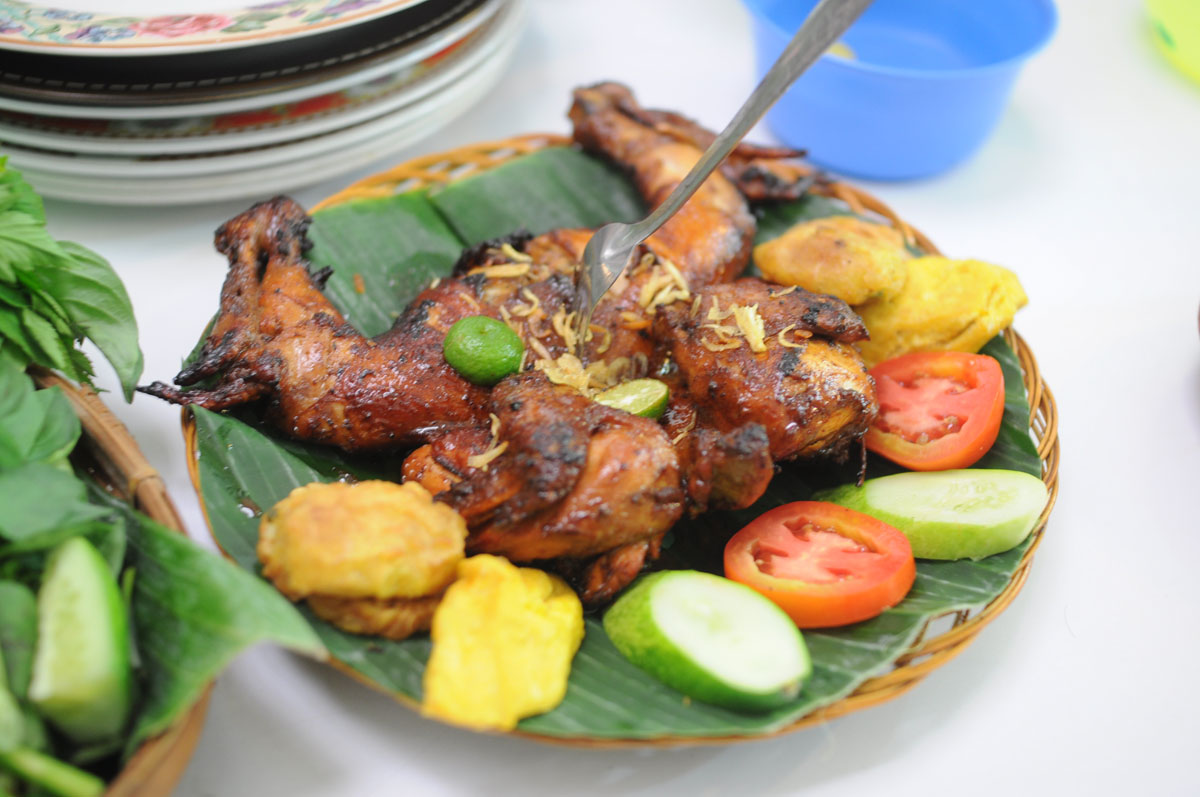
- Ayam bakar or grilled chicken
- Course: Main course
- Associated cuisine: Indonesia, Brunei, Malaysia, Singapore
- Serving temperature: Hot
- Main ingredients: Chicken seasoned with turmeric, garlic, shallots and other spices, and grilled on charcoal

Ayam bakar (Indonesian pronunciation: [ˌajam ˈbakar]; Malay pronunciation: [ˌajam ˈbaka(r)]) is an Indonesian and Malay dish, consisting of charcoal-grilled chicken. Ayam bakar literally means "grilled chicken" in Indonesian and Malay.

In 2023, TasteAtlas ranked Indonesian grilled chicken, 'Ayam Bakar', as one of the best traditional chicken dishes in the world.

== Marination and spices ==
In Java, the chicken is usually marinated with a mixture of kecap manis (sweet soy sauce) and coconut oil, applied with a brush during grilling. The bumbu spice mixture may vary among regions, but usually it consists of a combination of ground shallot, garlic, chili pepper, coriander, tamarind juice, candlenut, turmeric, galangal, and salt. In Java, ayam bakar usually tastes rather sweet because of the generous amount of sweet soy sauce either as marination or dipping sauce, while ayam bakar Padang, Bali, Lombok, and most of Sumatra are usually spicier and more reddish due to the generous amount of chilli pepper, turmeric and other spices and the absence of sweet soy sauce.

The chicken pieces are usually partially cooked in the spice mixture using a small fire before grilling for the chicken to absorb the spices. During the grilling process, the remaining spices are applied upon the chicken. Ayam bakar is usually served with sambal terasi (chilli with terasi) or sambal kecap (sliced chilli and shallot in sweet soy sauce) as dipping sauce or condiment and slices of cucumber and tomato as garnishing.

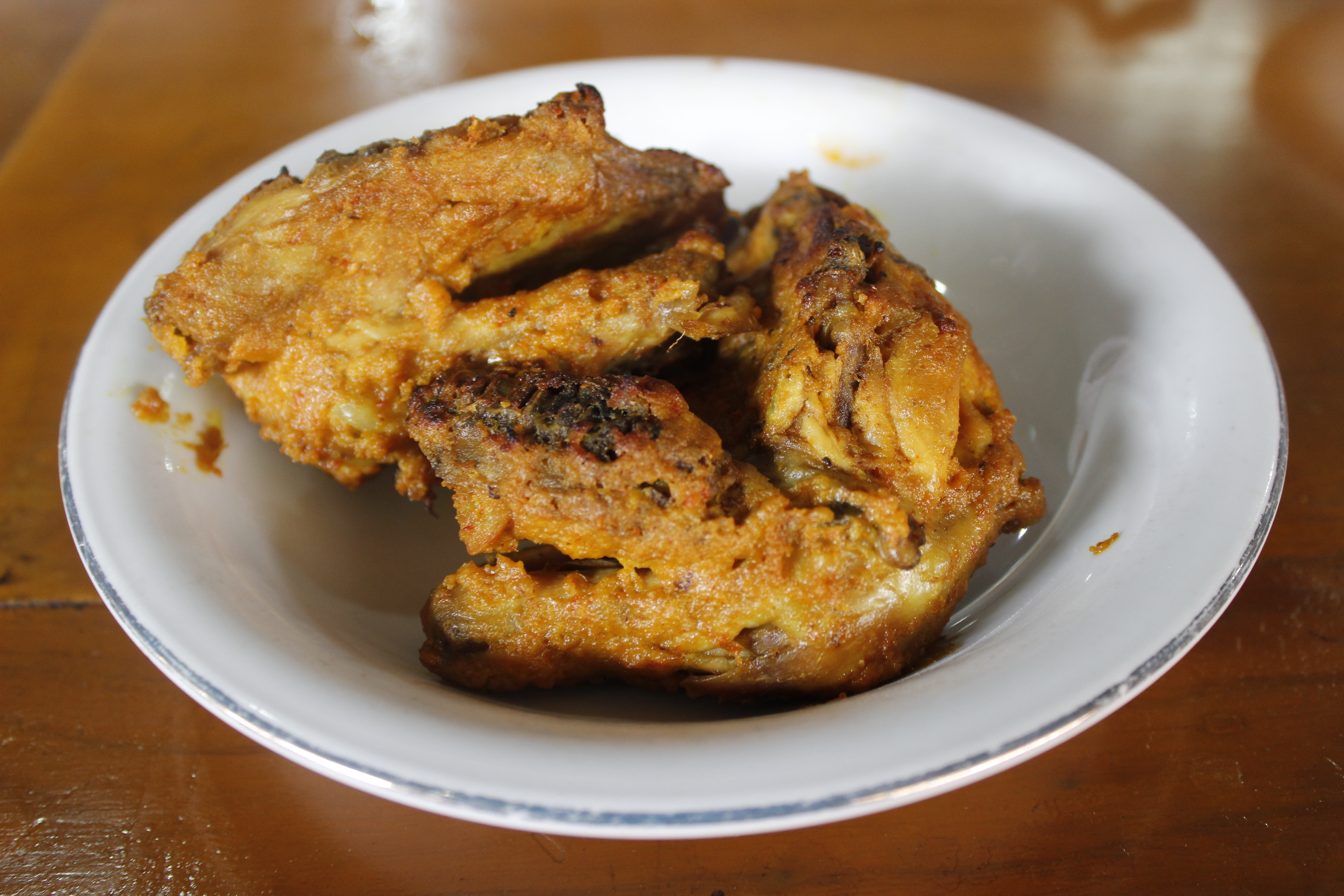
Ayam Bakar Padang, West Sumatra

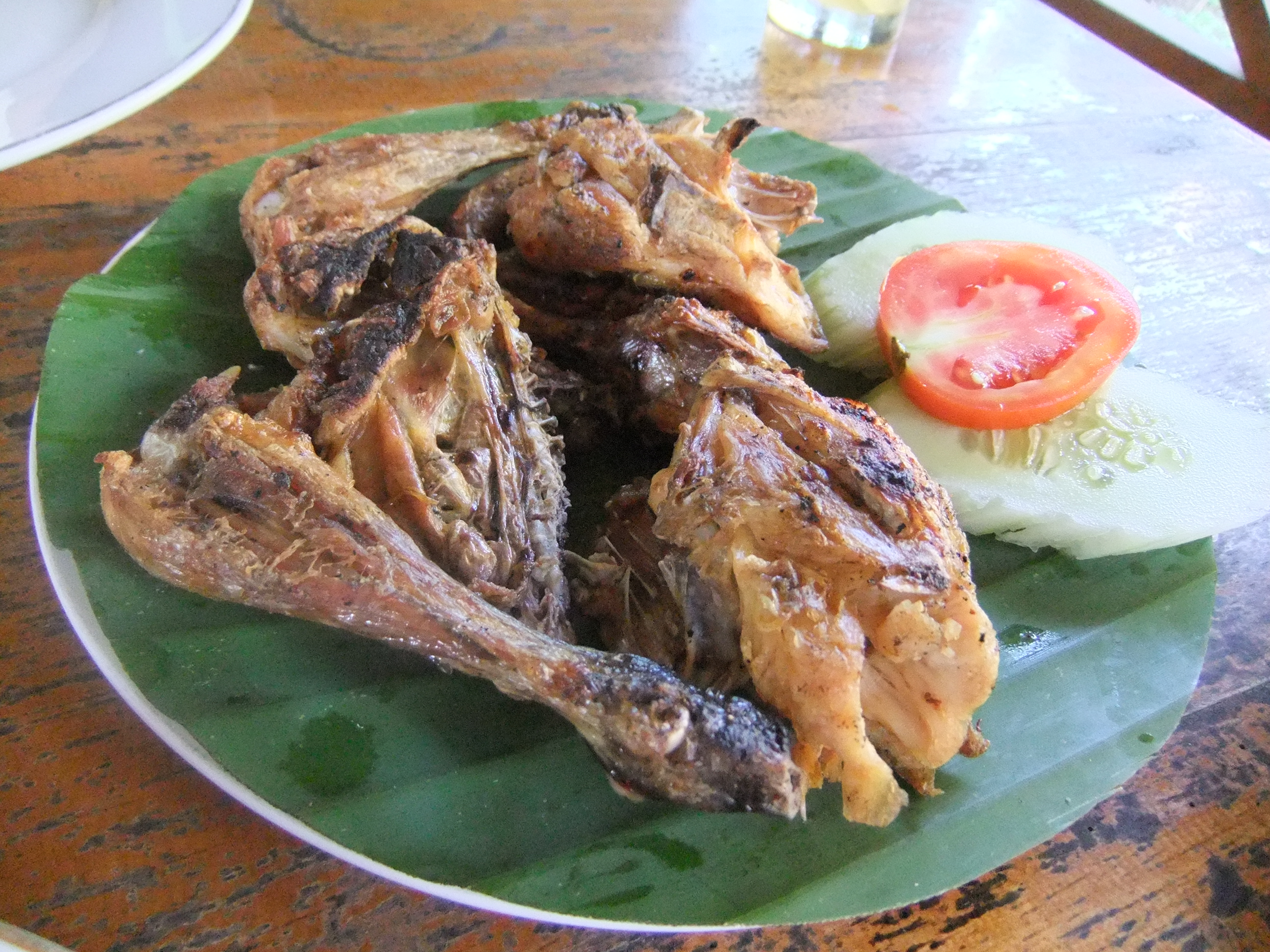
Ayam Bakar Taliwang, Lombok

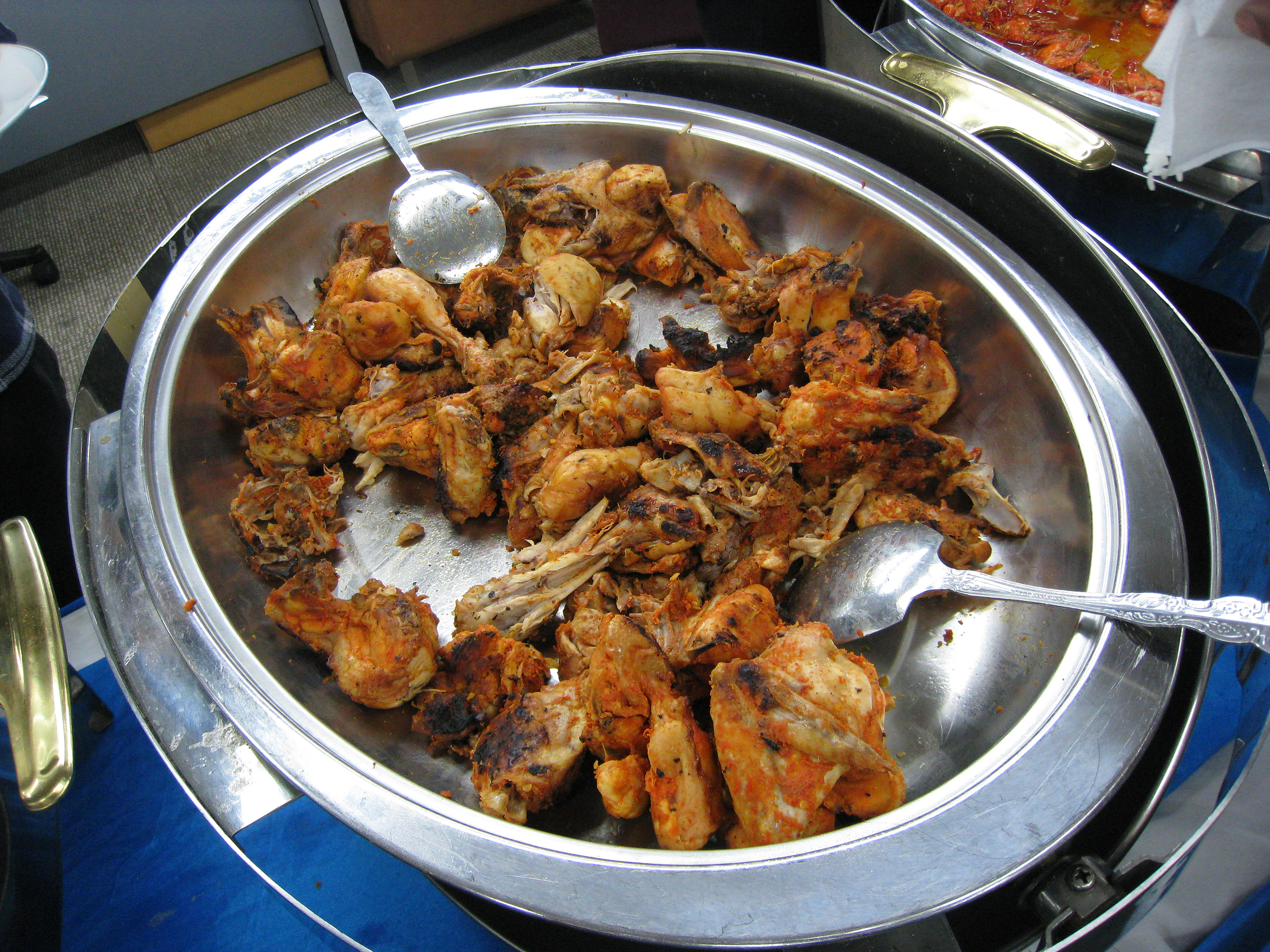
Ayam bakar bumbu rujak, Java

== Variants ==
There are many recipes of ayam bakar, among the popular ones are Padang-style ayam bakar, ayam percik and ayam golek from Malaysia, ayam bakar Taliwang of Lombok island, Sundanese bakakak hayam, and Javanese ayam bakar bumbu rujak (grilled spicy coconut chicken). Usually, the chicken is marinated with mixture of spice pastes, sometimes kecap manis (sweet soy sauce), and then grilled.

== See also ==
- Ayam bumbu rujak
- Ayam goreng
- Barbecue chicken
- Chicken inasal
- Ikan bakar
- List of chicken dishes
