= Aspergillus dimorphicus =

Scientific classification
- Kingdom: Fungi
- Division: Ascomycota
- Class: Eurotiomycetes
- Order: Eurotiales
- Family: Aspergillaceae
- Genus: Aspergillus
- Species: A. dimorphicus

Binomial name
- Aspergillus dimorphicus B.S. Mehrotra & R. Prasad (1969)

Species of fungus

Aspergillus dimorphicus is a species of fungus in the genus Aspergillus. It is from the Cremei section. The species was first described in 1969. It has been reported to produce wentilactones.

== Growth and morphology ==
A. dimorphicus has been cultivated on both Czapek yeast extract agar (CYA) plates and Malt Extract Agar Oxoid® (MEAOX) plates. The growth morphology of the colonies can be seen in the pictures below.

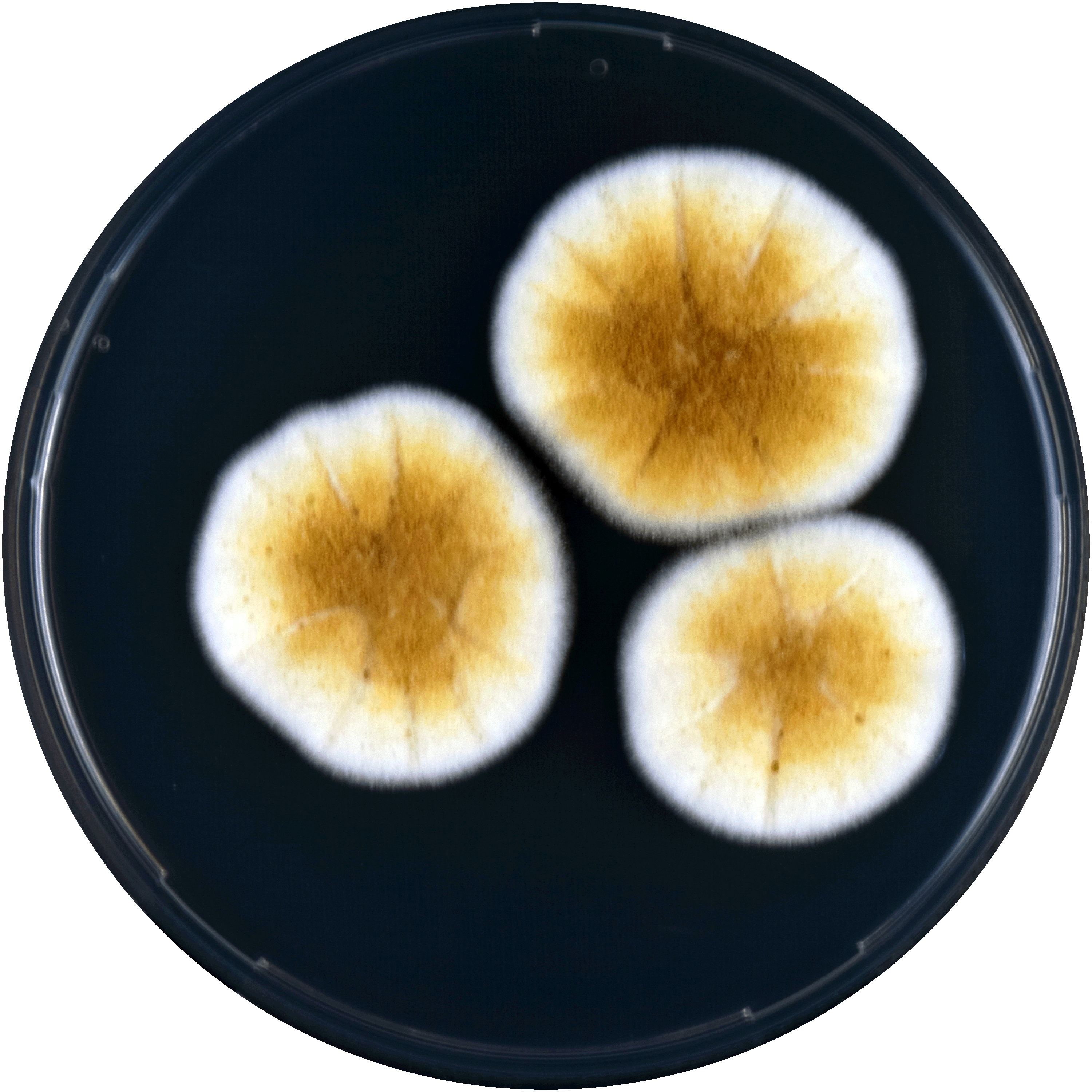
Aspergillus dimorphicus growing on CYA plate

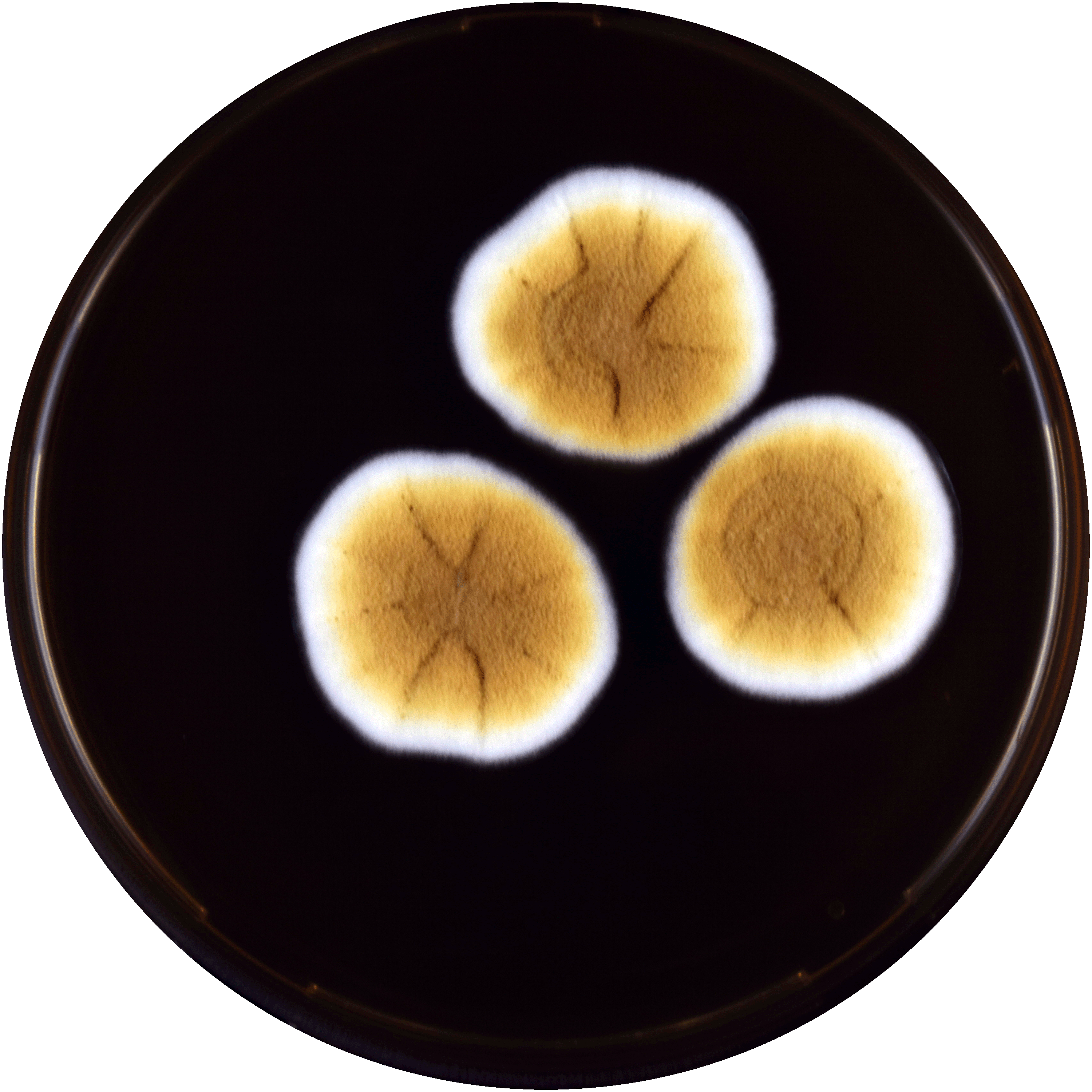
Aspergillus dimorphicus growing on MEAOX plate
