= Dextranase =

Identifiers
- EC no.: 3.2.1.11
- CAS no.: 9025-70-1

Databases
- IntEnz: IntEnz view
- BRENDA: BRENDA entry
- ExPASy: NiceZyme view
- KEGG: KEGG entry
- MetaCyc: metabolic pathway
- PRIAM: profile
- PDB structures: RCSB PDB PDBe PDBsum
Search
- PMC: articles
- PubMed: articles
- NCBI: proteins

Dextranase (EC 3.2.1.11, dextran hydrolase, endodextranase, dextranase DL 2, DL 2, endo-dextranase, α-D-1,6-glucan-6-glucanohydrolase, 1,6-α-D-glucan 6-glucanohydrolase) is an enzyme with systematic name 6-α-D-glucan 6-glucanohydrolase. It catalyses the following chemical reaction

Endohydrolysis of (1→6)-α-D-glucosidic linkages in dextran
