= Aspergillus avenaceus =

Scientific classification
- Kingdom: Fungi
- Division: Ascomycota
- Class: Eurotiomycetes
- Order: Eurotiales
- Family: Aspergillaceae
- Genus: Aspergillus
- Species: A. avenaceus

Binomial name
- Aspergillus avenaceus G. Smith (1943)

Species of fungus

Aspergillus avenaceus is a species of fungus in the genus Aspergillus. It is from the Flavi section. The species was first described in 1943. A. avenaceus has been isolated in the UK from a Pisum sativum seed, and in the United States. It has been reported to produce avenaciolide and aspirochlorine.

== Growth and morphology ==
A. avenaceus has been cultivated on both Czapek yeast extract agar (CYA) plates and Malt Extract Agar Oxoid® (MEAOX) plates. The growth morphology of the colonies can be seen in the pictures below.

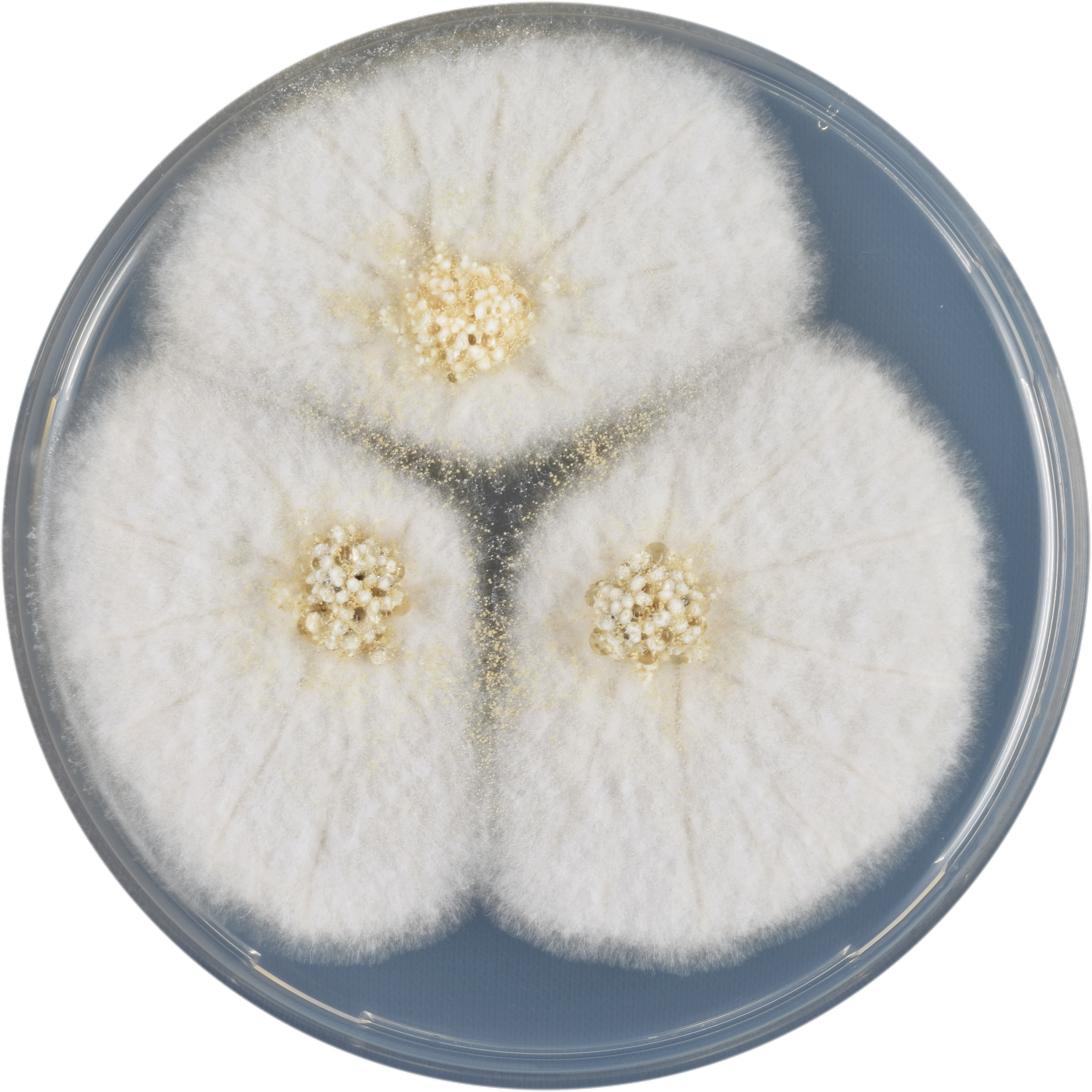
Aspergillus avenaceus growing on CYA plate

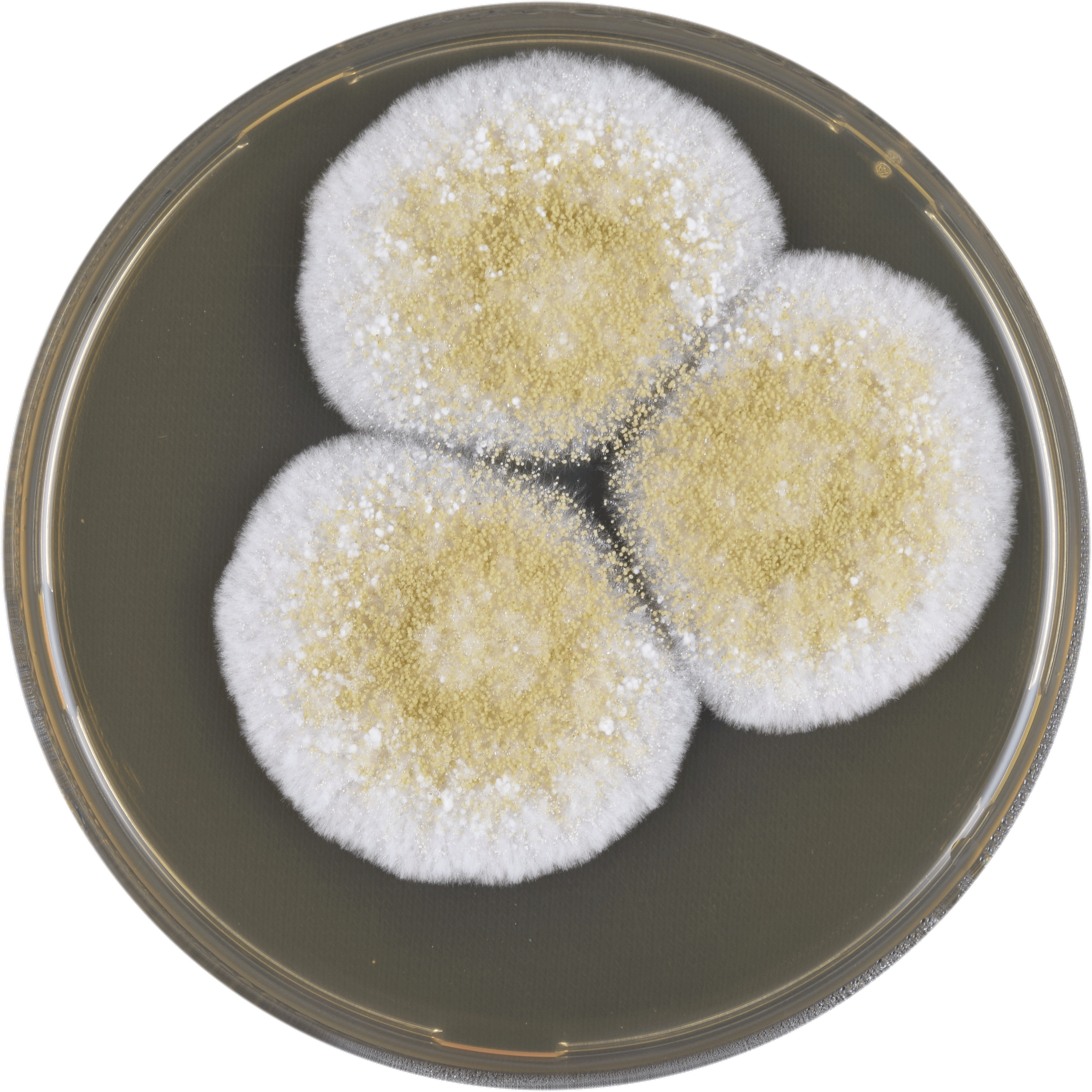
Aspergillus avenaceus growing on MEAOX plate
