= Aspergillus tamarii =

Scientific classification
- Kingdom: Fungi
- Division: Ascomycota
- Class: Eurotiomycetes
- Order: Eurotiales
- Family: Aspergillaceae
- Genus: Aspergillus
- Species: A. tamarii

Binomial name
- Aspergillus tamarii Kita (1913)

Species of fungus

Aspergillus tamarii is a species of fungus in the genus Aspergillus. It is from the Flavi section. The species was first described in 1913. A. tamarii has been used in the production of soy sauce. It has been isolated from soil in the United States.

== Growth and morphology ==
A. tamarii has been cultivated on both Czapek yeast extract agar (CYA) plates and Malt Extract Agar Oxoid (MEAOX) plates. The growth morphology of the colonies can be seen in the pictures below.

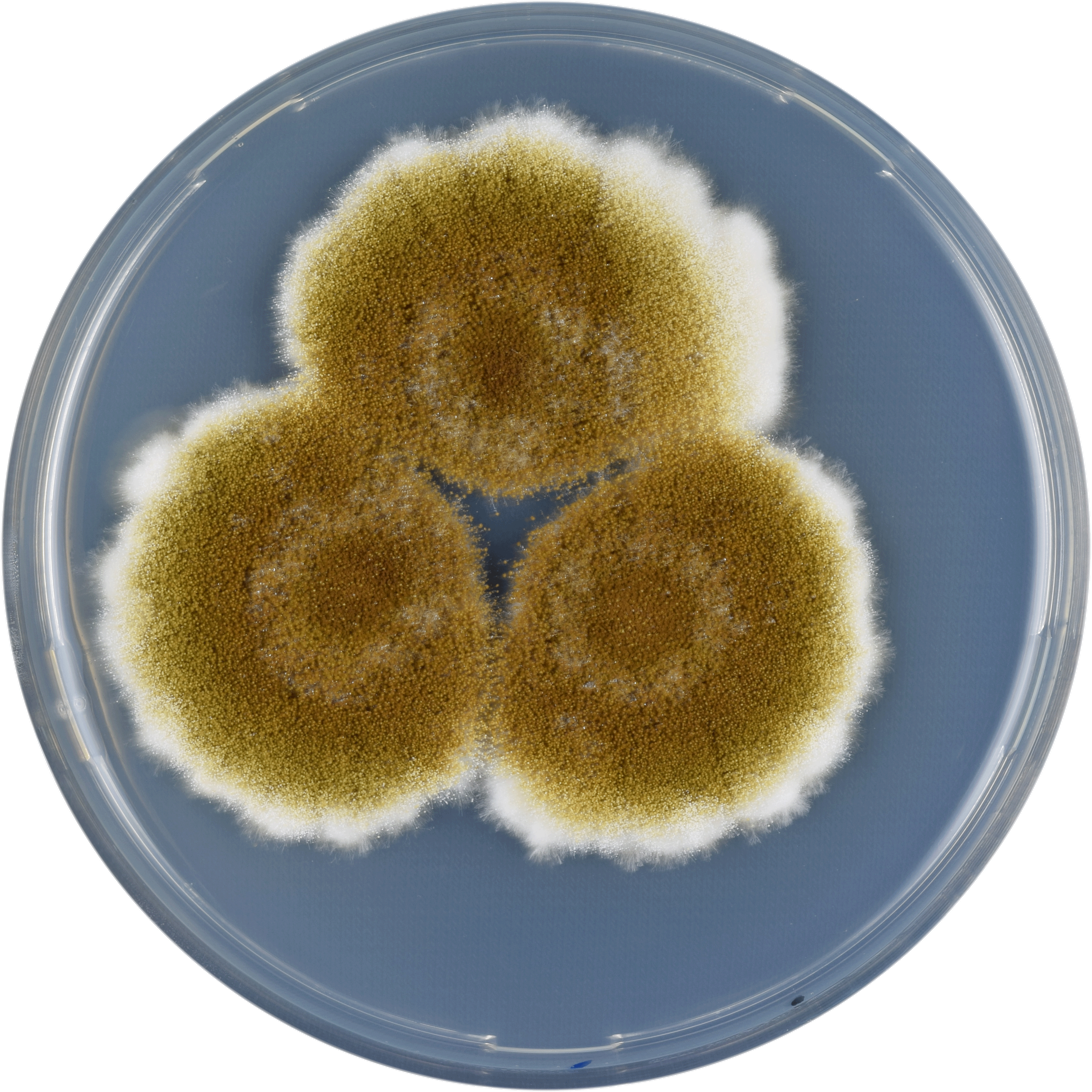
Aspergillus tamarii growing on CYA plate

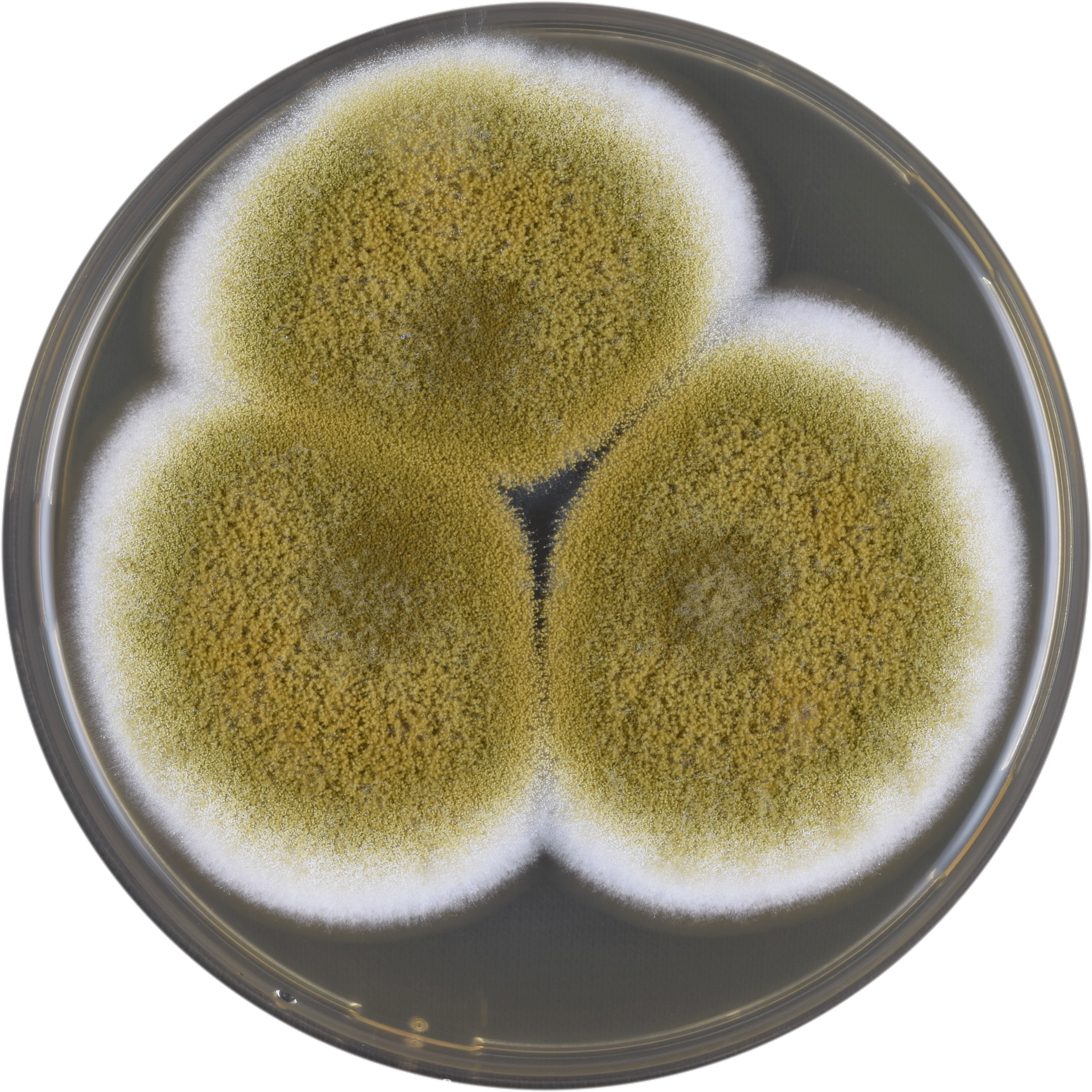
Aspergillus tamarii growing on MEAOX plate
