= Ayam Taliwang =

Indonesian chicken dish

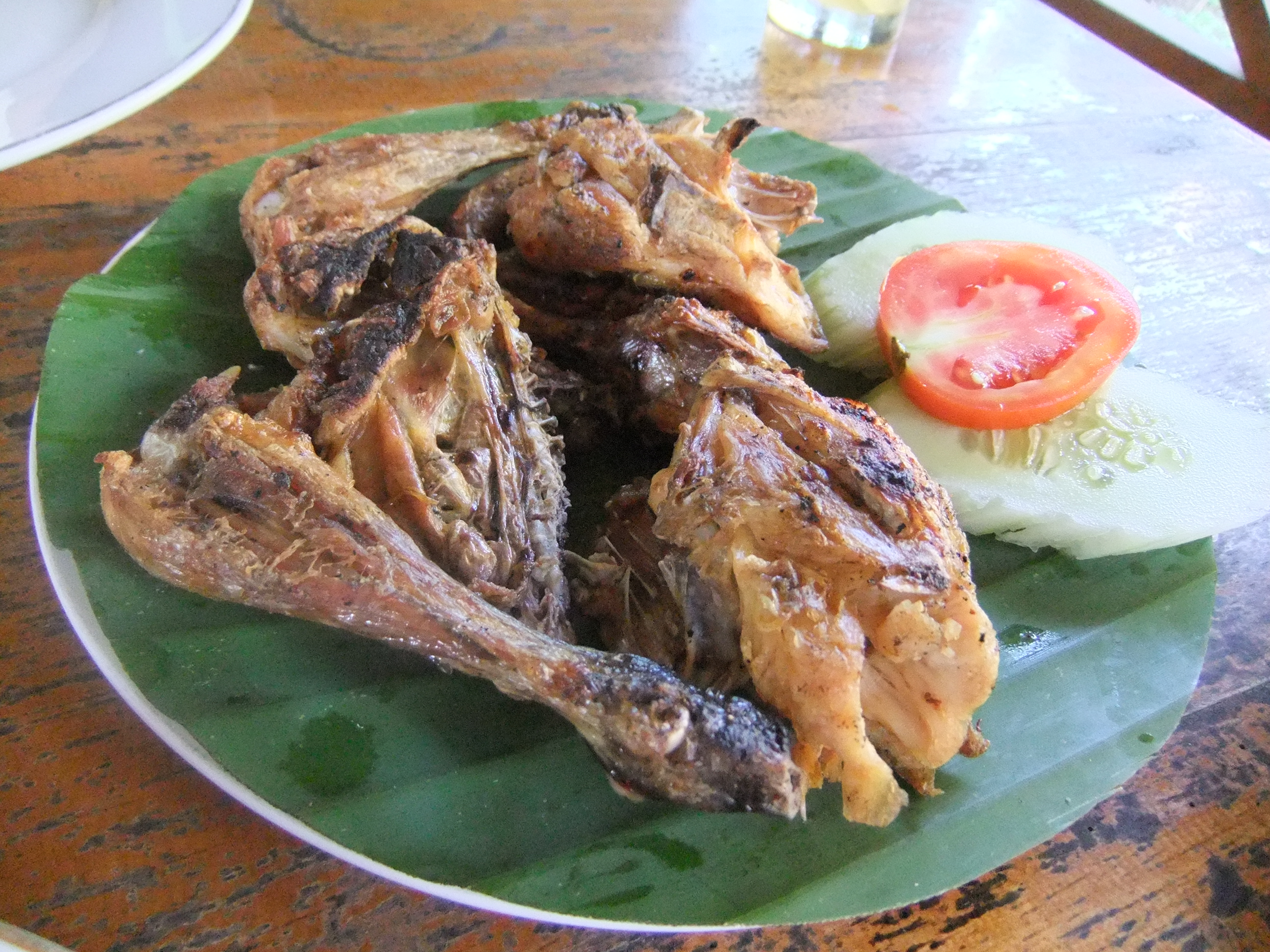
- Ayam Taliwang in Mataram
- Course: Main course
- Place of origin: Indonesia
- Region or state: Taliwang, Lombok
- Serving temperature: Hot or room temperature
- Main ingredients: Grilled chicken

Ayam Taliwang is a spicy Indonesian grilled chicken (ayam bakar) dish originating in Taliwang, West Nusa Tenggara, Indonesia.

== History ==
Although Ayam Taliwang is said to be a dish favoured by the Sasak nobility, Abdul Hamid claims to have invented the dish in 1970. It is named after Karang Taliwang in Mataram, the capital of Lombok.

== Preparation ==
Ayam Taliwang is made with chicken cut and cleaned before grilling. Once it has been grilled halfway, it is removed from the grill and tenderized with a pestle. It is then dipped in cooking oil; after several seconds in the oil, it is put in a spicy sauce of garlic, chilli, and shrimp paste. It is then fried or grilled to order.

== Presentation ==
Ayam Taliwang physically appears similar to regular grilled or fried chicken, with a covering of sambal. Its taste is sweet and spicy, with traces of shrimp paste. It can be served with a side of water spinach (pelecing) and eggplant (beberuk) covered with chili sauce.

== Variations ==
The Taliwang flavour has been adapted for instant noodles.

== See also ==
- List of chicken dishes
