= Semur (Indonesian stew) =

Indonesian meat stew

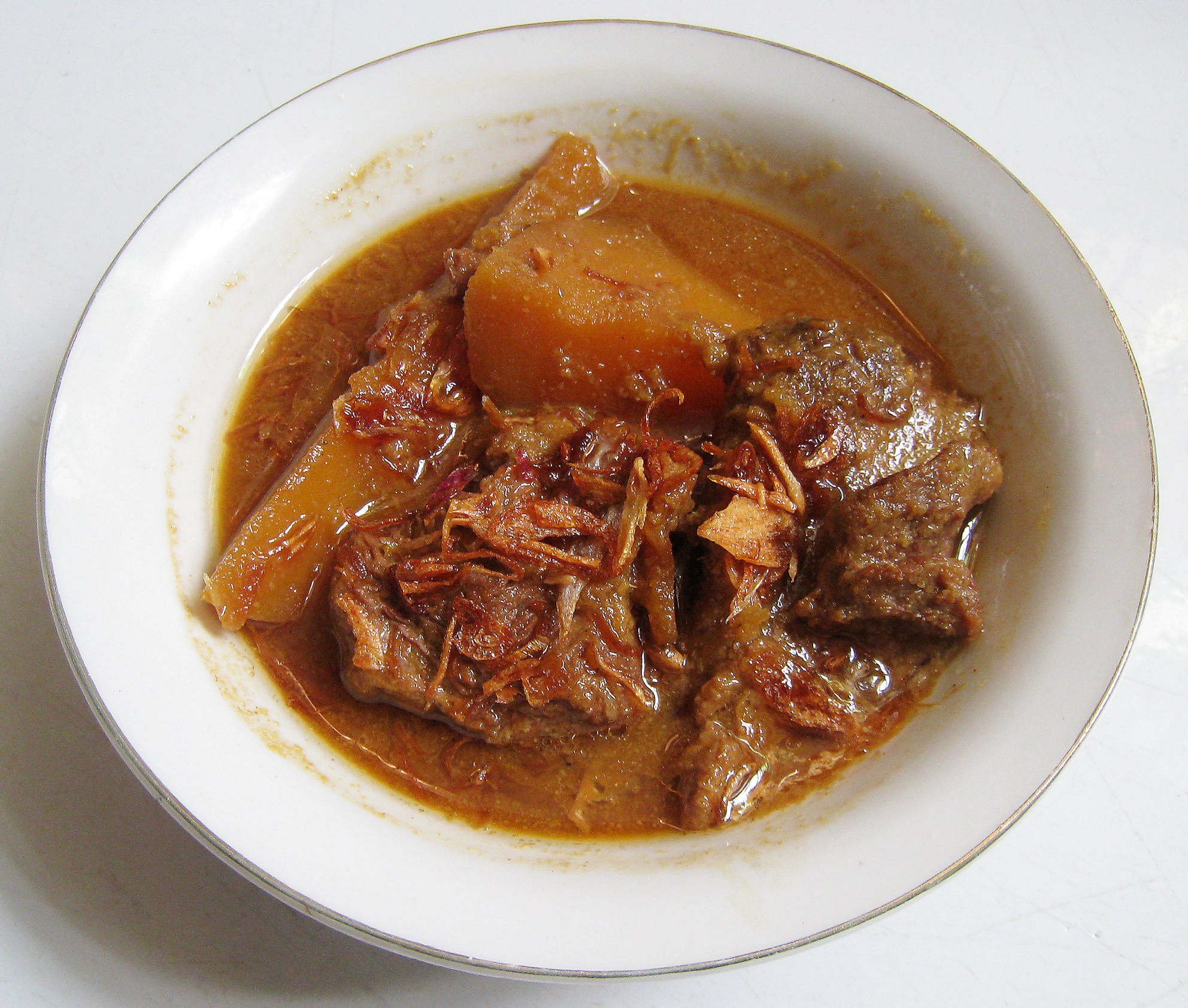
- Semur daging with potatoes, sprinkled with fried shallots
- Alternative names: Smoor (Dutch dialect)
- Course: Main course
- Place of origin: Indonesia
- Region or state: Southeast Asia
- Serving temperature: Hot or room temperature
- Main ingredients: Beef and potatoes simmered in sweet soy sauce, with garlic, shallot, nutmeg, cloves, and cinnamon, topped with fried shallot
- Variations: Beef tongue, chicken, tofu, eggs, fish

Semur (Indonesian pronunciation: [səˈmʊr]) is an Indonesian meat stew (mainly beef) braised in thick brown gravy. It is commonly found in Indonesian cuisine. The main ingredients in the gravy are sweet soy sauce, shallots, onions, garlic, ginger, candlenut, nutmeg, and cloves (and sometimes with black pepper, coriander, cumin, and cinnamon).

Sweet soy sauce and candlenuts are the most important ingredients in the semur-making process because they serve to strengthen the flavor, yet they must be blended harmoniously with the other ingredients. In addition to the spices and seasonings, semur also consists of a wide range of main ingredients with variation in presentation, such as meat (mainly beef), beef tongue, potato, tofu, tomato, tempeh, eggs, chicken, and fish, and is often sprinkled with fried shallots or other variations according to the taste preferences of the communities in each region.

== Etymology ==
Semur is derived from the Dutch verb "smoren", which means "to braise food".

== History and origins ==
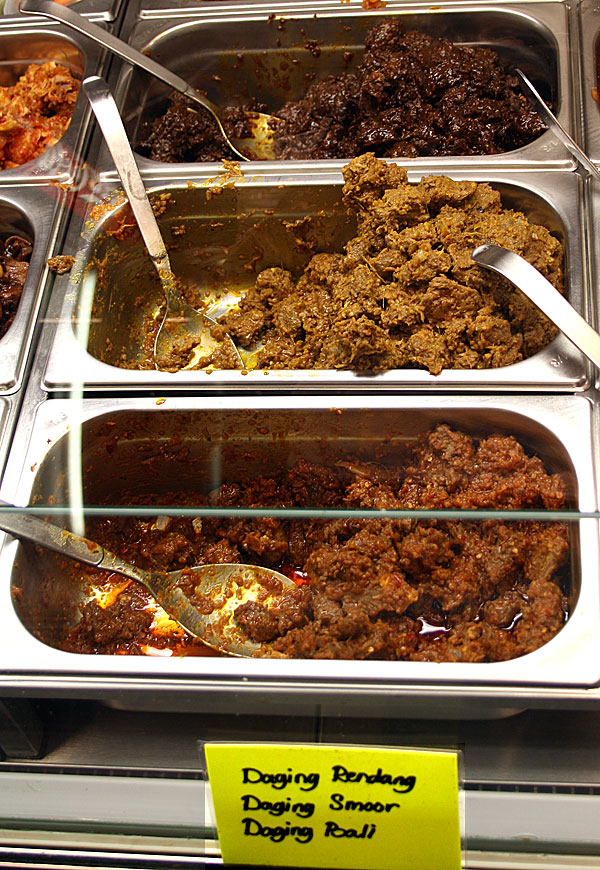
Meat dishes of Indonesia sold in Netherlands, rendang, smoor, and Bali-style meat

History shows that the dish of marinated boiled meat in Indonesia has been known since the 9th century CE in ancient Java. This can be seen from some of the inscriptions, and reliefs of the temples in Java that tell "Ganan, hadanan prana wdus" or "buffaloes and goats served with vegetables". However, whether the buffalo and goat meat mentioned in these records was the same dishes as stews today is still uncertain.

For centuries, Indonesia has attracted world traders for its natural resources. Exotic flavors of Indonesian spices such as nutmeg, cloves, and cinnamon have attracted traders. Foreign traders and immigrants brought their culture, which gradually blended into everyday Indonesian culture. This assimilation has developed a blend of traditions of the archipelago, including culinary. The European Dutch colonial is believed to have brought the stewing technique and combined it with local spices and local sweet soy sauce, dark soy sauce with caramelized palm sugar, and various spices added, which has become one of the most popular flavours. The particular flavor of Indonesian spices combined with a variety of foreign food processing techniques has resulted in the creation of unique dishes such as semur, which existed since 1600.

Centuries of interactions between the Netherlands and Indonesia have contributed to the development of the stew's flavor. Javanese stew which in earlier served as the main menu in the banquet of the Dutch is derived from the word smoor (Dutch: "stew"). Smoor in Dutch means food that has simmered with tomatoes and onions in a long cooking process. One of the oldest and most cookbook recipes complete document in the Dutch East Indies, Groot Nieuw Oost-Indisch Volledig Kookboek published in 1902, contains six recipes stew (Smoor Ajam I, Ajam Smoor II, Smoor Ajam III, Smoor Bandjar van Kip, Smoor Bantam van Kip, Solosche Smoor van Kip). This book asserts that the later smoor stew was the kitchen cooking method developed in Dutch East Indies (Indonesia) by the Eurasian.

Over time, semur was incorporated into Indonesian tradition and served in a variety of traditional events. Javanese with their preference for sweet dishes has favoured semur and consider it as part of Javanese cuisine. Betawi people in Jakarta have adopted semur as part of their tradition that is always served during Lebaran, weddings, and any important celebrations. Betawi people like to cook dogfruit with spices and soy sauce to make semur jengkol (dogfruit stew). Not only Betawi culture, semur also often appeared at celebration events in various parts of the archipelago such as Kalimantan and Sumatra, with the flavor and appearance that suit local tastes.

At first, semur was associated with the beef that is processed in thick brown gravy. However it was later developed into various ingredients and recipes; ox tongue, mutton, chicken, eggs, also for vegetable products, such as tofu, tempeh, eggplant, and others. Semur has become a daily dishes served in Indonesian households and can be found in various parts of Indonesia.

Semur might be served individually with rice, lontong, or as part of the whole complete meal of rijsttafel, buffet, or as one of the side dishes in tumpeng, nasi uduk or nasi rames.

== Varieties of semur ==
- Semur commonly : beef sometimes othe mammals poultry fish shrimp squid bivalve or animal organ like interstine tongue others plus the veggies semur, the most common type of semur commonly found in World. In Indonesia, mostly stew used soy sauce or kecap as substitute gravy sauce or petis/stok pekat in Malay mixing culture chinese and western culinary.
- Semur betawi: semur of Betawi people in Jakarta and West Java, usually consist of beef, potato, and eggs with slightly different spices
- Semur jengkol: jengkol stinky-bean semur popular in Jakarta and West Java
- Semur manado: semur from Manado North Sulawesi
- Semur banjar: semur from Banjarmasin South Kalimantan
- Semur aceh: Aceh beef semur
- Semur goreng samarinda: fried semur from Samarinda
- Semur ternate: semur from Ternate vinegar added stew similar the european wine stew
- Semur kelapa: coconut semur, can found in Minang called as Rendang and Moluccans added the coconut water or juice
- Semur rawon: black stew from East Java added fermented pangi or kluwek

== See also ==
- List of beef dishes
- List of stews
