= Tinorangsak =

Indonesian hot and spicy meat dish

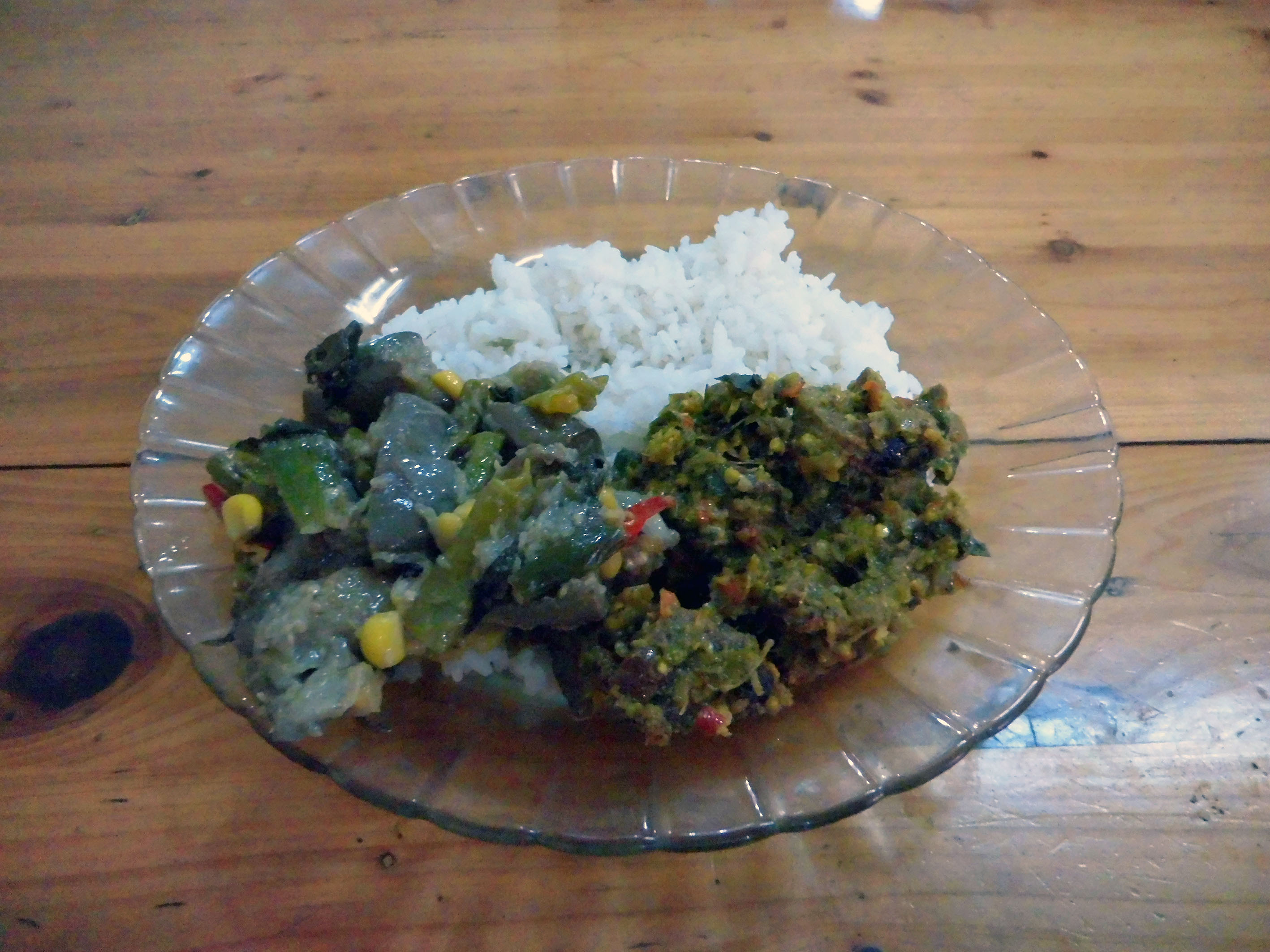
- Pork Tinorangsak, eggplant and steamed rice
- Alternative names: Tinoransak
- Course: Main course
- Place of origin: Indonesia
- Region or state: North Sulawesi
- Serving temperature: Hot
- Main ingredients: Pork, other meat, chicken, or seafood in hot and spicy spice mixture

Tinorangsak or tinoransak is an Indonesian hot and spicy meat dish that uses specific bumbu (spice mixture) found in Manado cuisine of North Sulawesi, Indonesia. The most common meat used in tinorangsak is pork. However, other kind of meat such as beef, chicken or seafood might be used as well. Spices mixture includes chili pepper, shallot or onion, ginger, lime leaves, lemongrass, lime juice, cooking oil, and salt.

Tinorangsak is a prerequisite dish commonly served in Minahasan traditional ceremonies. Traditionally, tinorangsak is cooked in a bamboo tube; diced pork and rich spices are inserted into the tube and burned on an open fire. Usually, tinorangsak is served with nasi jaha, a glutinous rice dish cooked in bamboo tube in a similar fashion to lemang.

== See also ==
- Rica-rica
- Dabu-dabu
- Woku
- Paniki
- Tinutuan
