= Colo-colo (condiment) =

Indonesian hot and spicy condiment

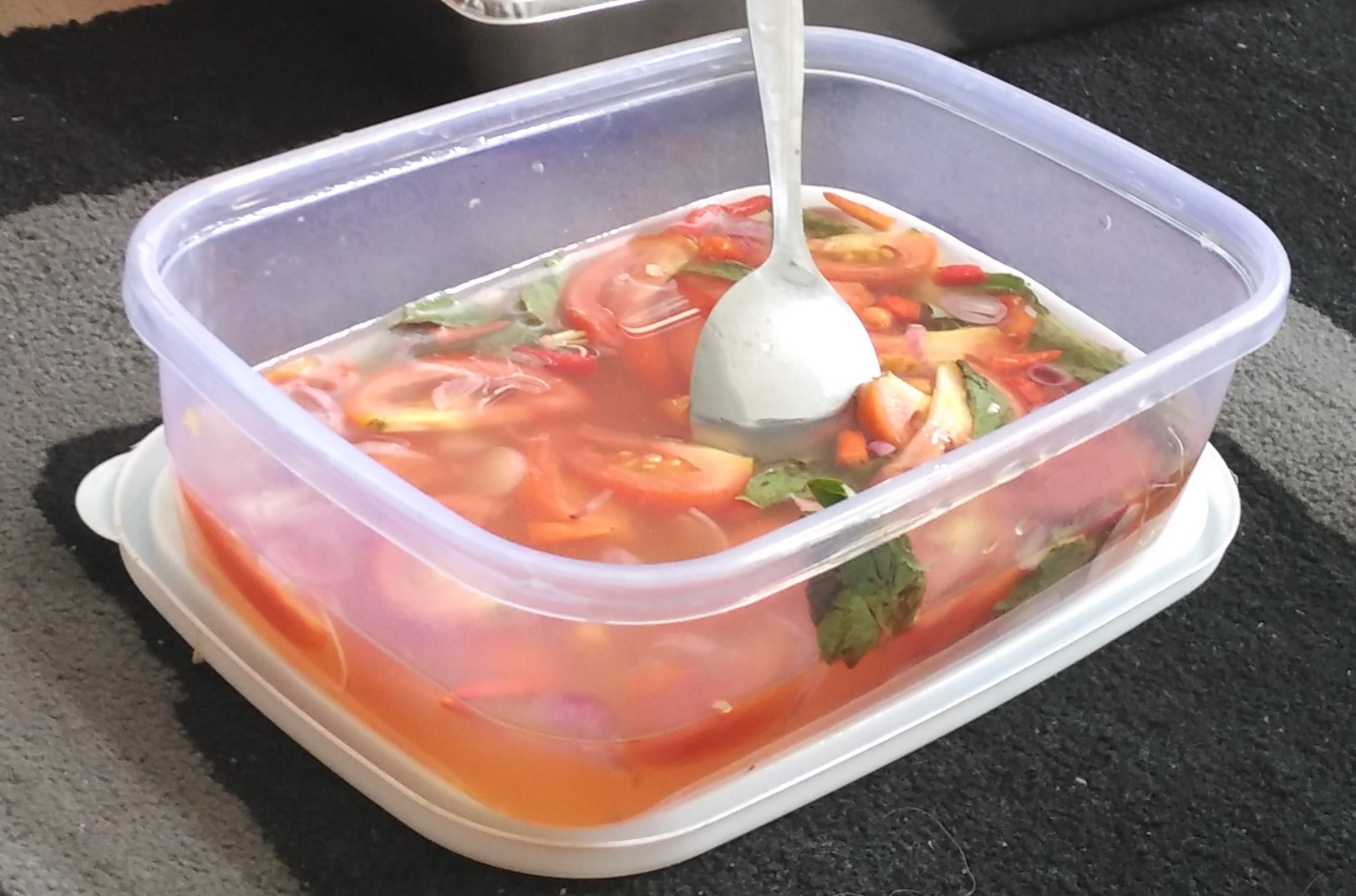
- Sambal Colo-colo
- Course: Condiment
- Place of origin: Indonesia
- Region or state: Maluku
- Associated cuisine: Indonesia
- Main ingredients: Chili, tomato, shallot, lime, and lemon basil

Colo-colo is an acidic condiment commonly found in Maluku archipelago, Indonesia. It is believed to have originated in Ambon city, and accordingly is often described as Ambon's sambal. Colo-colo is similar to Manado's dabu-dabu, as they both use many chopped red chili peppers, bird's eye chili, shallots, red and green tomatoes, and a pinch of salt and sugar, mixed with fresh calamansi juice or locally known as lemon cui or jeruk kesturi (sometimes replaced by kaffir lime or lemon juice). The main difference is that colo-colo recipe often includes additional ingredients, such as chopped lemon basil, kenari nut, and tahi minyak or ampas minyak (black-colored cooking coconut oil residue), or caramelized rarobang (watery residue of coconut oil-making process). As a result, colo-colo is darker and more oily than dabu-dabu.

However, today, because of the rarity and difficulty to acquire traditional cooking oil residue and caramelized rarobang, this oily agent is often replaced by widely available and practical kecap manis (sweet soy sauce) mixed with margarine, coconut oil or cooking oil. As a result, today colo-colo is often mistaken for another Indonesian common condiment, sambal kecap.

Maluku archipelago is famous for its rich collection of seafoods, and colo-colo is usually served as condiment for seafood, especially various recipes of ikan bakar (grilled fish) and ikan goreng (fried fish). Fish commonly served with colo-colo as a dipping sauce or coating include bubara (giant trevally), kakap merah (red snapper), baronang (rabbitfish), cakalang (skipjack tuna), and the endangered ikan kakatua (bullethead parrotfish).

== See also ==
- Sambal
- Balado
- Dabu-dabu
- Pico de gallo
- Rica-rica
- Woku
- Papeda
