= Mie ikan =

Indonesian noodle dish

- Alternative names: mi ikan
- Place of origin: Indonesia
- Serving temperature: Hot
- Main ingredients: Noodles, fish

Mie ikan is an Indonesian noodle dish made of noodles and fish. The fish is used to make its soup and also becomes a topping or condiment for the dish. One of the famous ones is mie ikan from Toboali, South Bangka Regency.

== Variants ==
Some regions throughout Indonesian archipelago have their specialty of mie ikan, include:

1. Mie ikan Toboali (Toboali fish noodle), noodle dish with seasoned mashed fish and bean sprouts.
2. Mie ikan laut pedas, a spicy saltwater fish noodle dish.
3. Mie ikan Namlea (Namlea fish noodle), fish noodle soup with shredded fish and vegetable.
4. Mie cakalang, skipjack tuna noodle soup from North Sulawesi.
5. Mie eungkot suree, spicy fish noodle soup of Laweung, Pidie Regency.
6. Mie Koba, Koba seer fish noodle soup.
7. Mie kocok Sabang, noodle soup with diced fish, bean sprouts and egg. There are two notable mie kocok Sabang, videlicet mie sedap and mie jalak.
8. Mie Tarempa, sweet sour tuna noodles from Riau Islands.

== See also ==
- Indonesian noodles
- Cuisine of Indonesia
