= Ikan goreng =

Indonesian and Malaysian fried fish

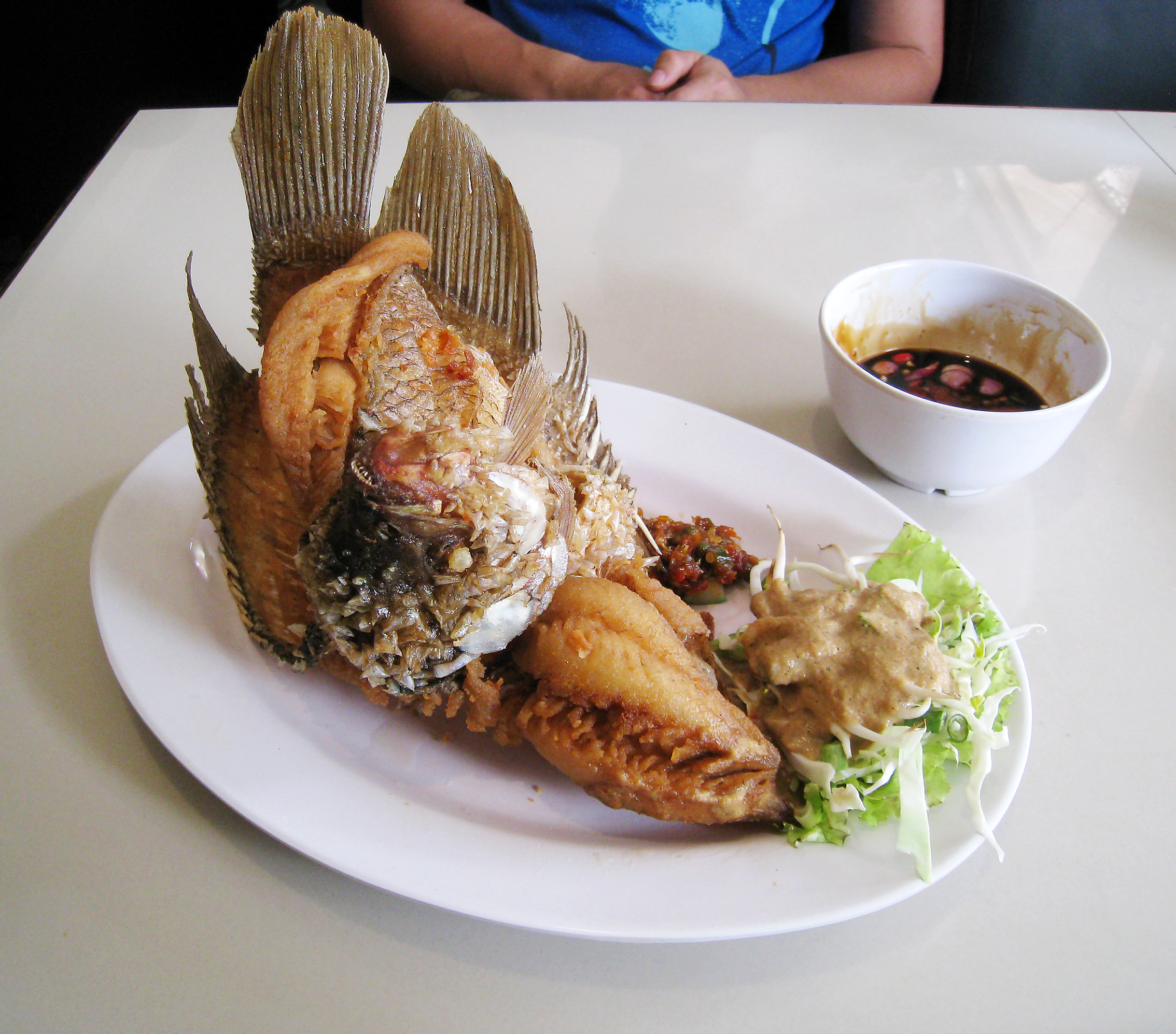
- Sundanese gurame goreng kipas (fan fried gourami) with karedok garnishing and sambal
- Course: Main course
- Associated cuisine: Indonesia, Brunei, Malaysia, Singapore
- Serving temperature: Hot
- Main ingredients: Fish, seasoned with garlic, shallots and other spices and deep fried in coconut oil

Ikan goreng (Malay pronunciation: [ˌikan ˈɡoreŋ]) is a hot dish consisting of deep fried fish or other forms of seafood. Ikan goreng literally means "fried fish" in Indonesian and Malay languages.

Ikan goreng is very popular in Indonesia. Usually, the fish is marinated with mixture of spice pastes. Some recipes use kecap manis (sweet soy sauce) to coat the fish after being fried. Ikan goreng are usually deep fried in ample extremely hot coconut oil until the fish turns golden and crisp. This method is often used with carp, gourami and milkfish in order to turn the fine fishbone crumbly, crisp and edible.

== Spices ==
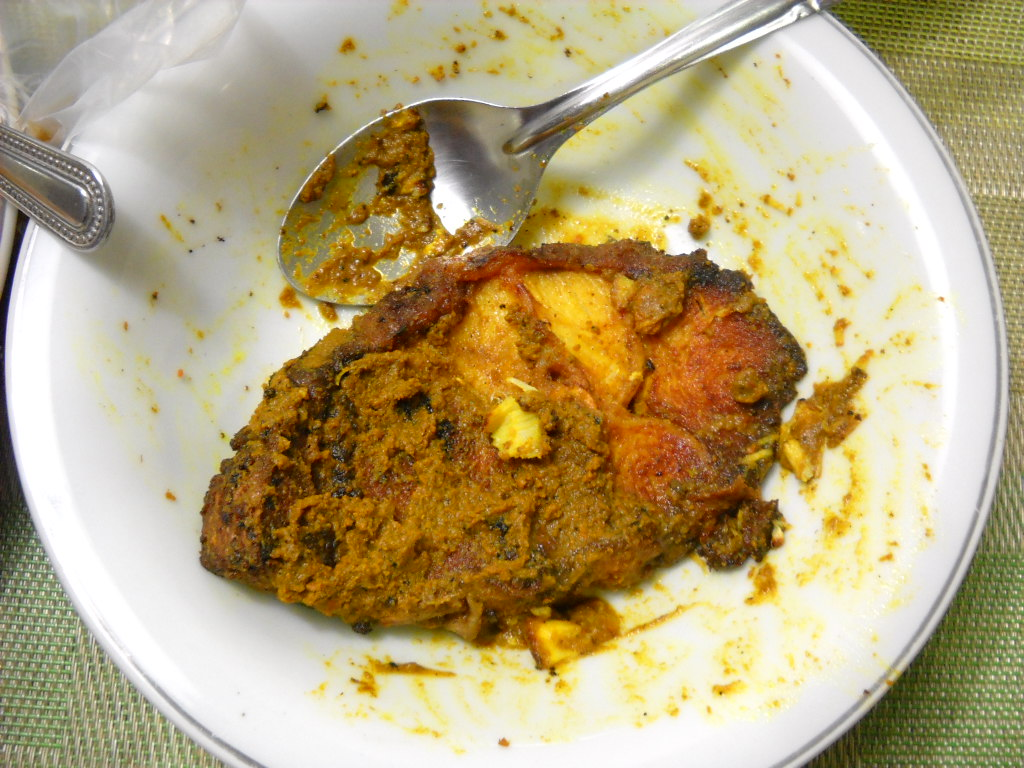
Ikan goreng kunyit, fried fish spiced with turmeric.

Before frying, the fish is typically marinated with a mixture of various spices, and sometimes kecap manis (sweet soy sauce). The spices mixture may vary among regions and places, but usually it consists of combination of salt, lemon juice, ground shallot, garlic, chili pepper, coriander, turmeric, galangal and salt. Some recipes may employ batter or egg coating on fish prior to frying. After being fried, commonly fish might be consumed right away with steamed rice and sambal terasi (chili with shrimp paste) or sambal kecap (slices of chili, shallot, and sweet soy sauce) as dipping sauce. The East Indonesian Manado and Maluku ikan goreng usually uses dabu-dabu or colo-colo condiment.

Some recipes of ikan goreng might add additional bumbu (spice mixture) mixed with or poured on top of fried fish, such as bumbu acar kuning (yellow pickles), made of turmeric, garlic, and other spices paste with sliced cucumber, carrot, chili, and round shalots, or chopped tomato with vinegar. Another close recipes such as fish rica-rica and asam pedas.

== Variants ==
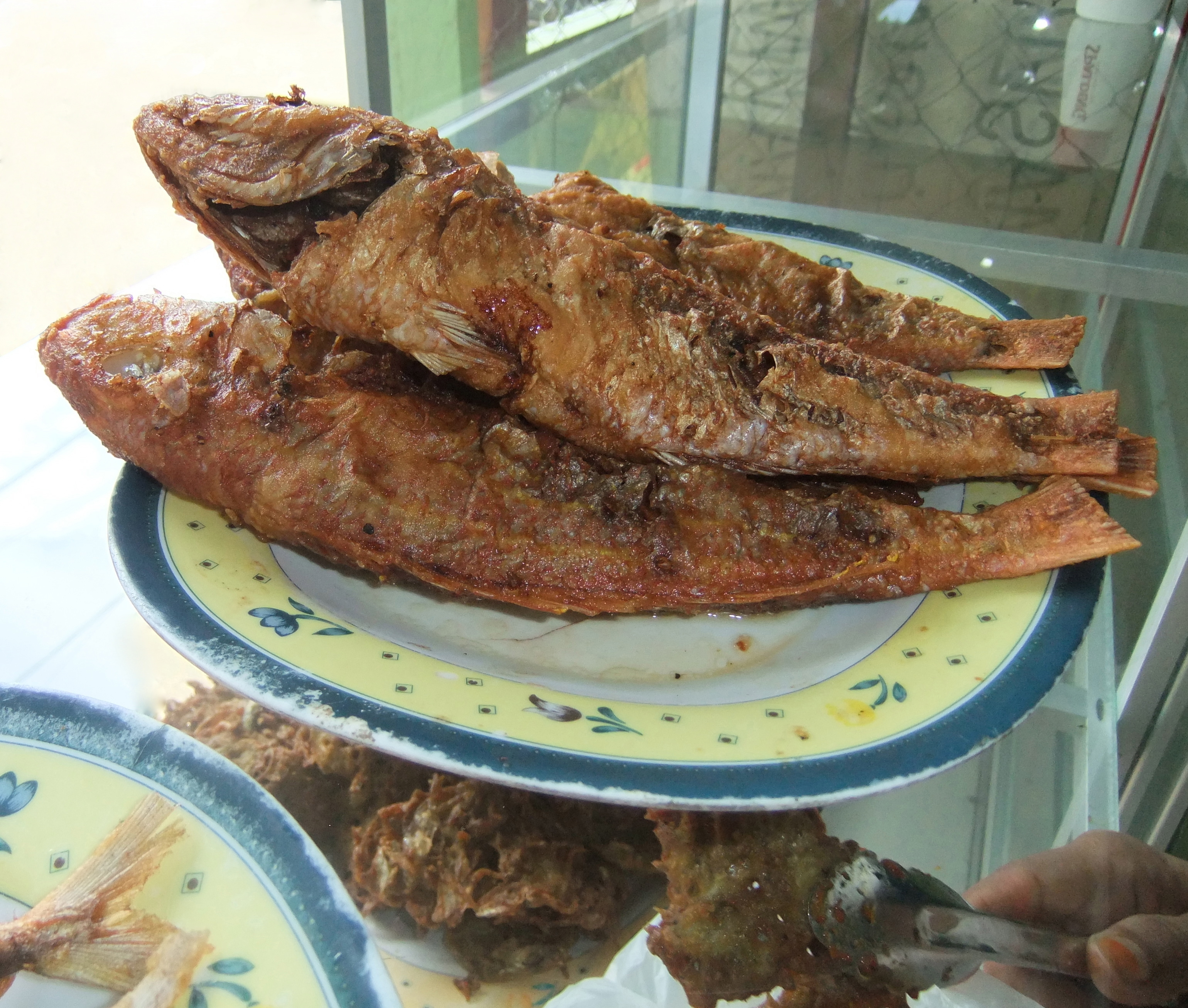
Fried fish, probably Moluccan snapper (Lutjanus boutton) in Palopo, South Sulawesi.

There are many variants and recipes of ikan goreng, differ from the recipes of marinate spices, bumbu toppings, dipping sauces or sambals, to the species of fish being fried. Almost all kind of edible fish and seafood can be made into ikan goreng, the most popular are freshwater gourami, bilis (mystacoleucus), patin (pangasius), nila (nile tilapia), mujair (mozambique tilapia), lele (clarias), gabus (channa striata), and ikan mas (carp). Seafood fried fish include bandeng (milkfish), tongkol or cakalang (skipjack tuna), tuna, bawal (pomfret), tenggiri (wahoo), kuwe (trevally), baronang (rabbitfish), kerapu (garoupa), kakap merah (red snapper), Ayam-Ayam (Starry triggerfish), teri (anchovy), belanak (bluespot mullet), todak (swordfish), hiu or cucut (shark) and pari (stingray).

== See also ==
- Ikan bakar
- Pecel Lele
- List of fish dishes
