= Ayam rica-rica =

Indonesian chicken dish

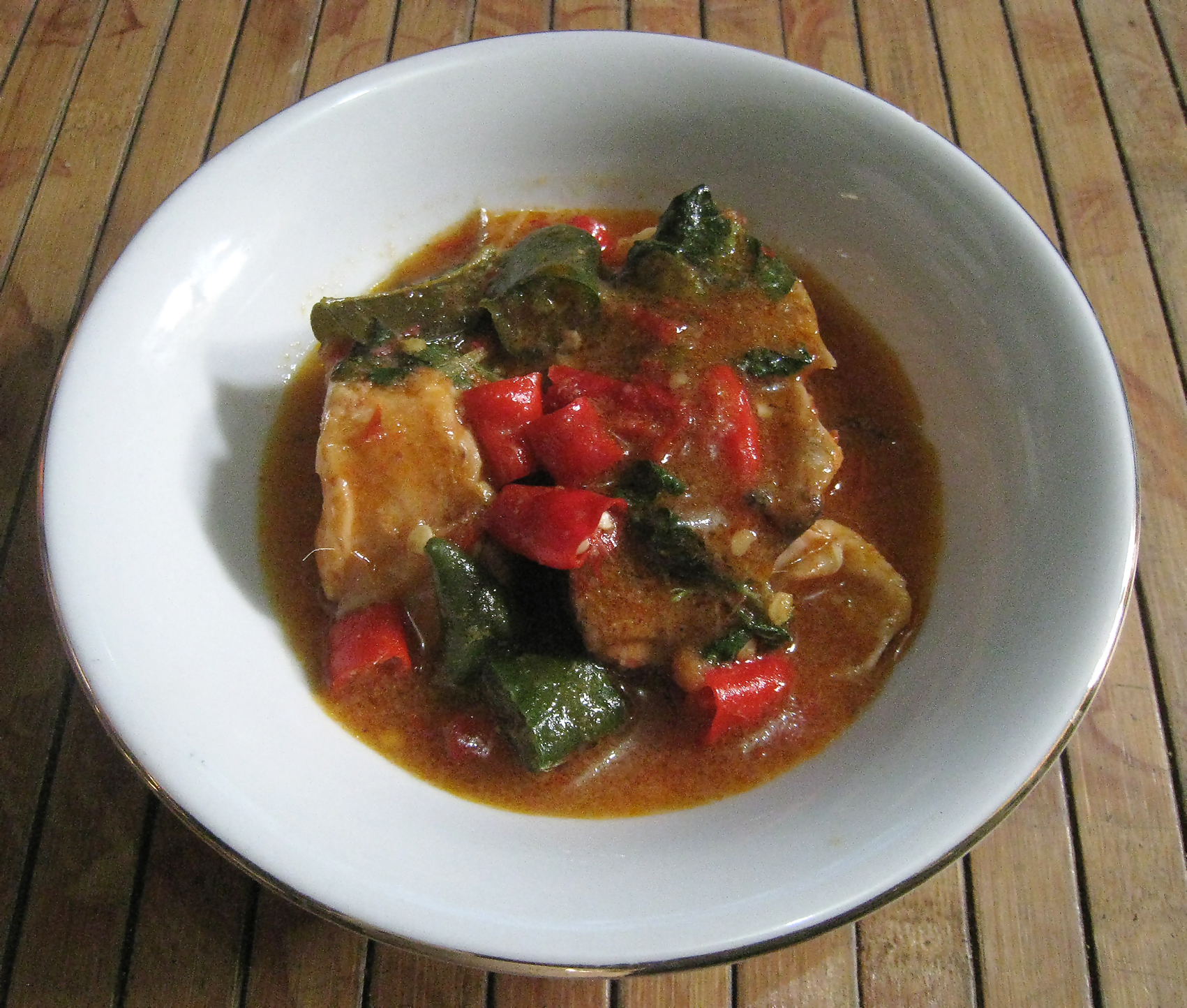
- A bowl of ayam rica-rica
- Alternative names: Ayam rica
- Course: Main course
- Place of origin: Indonesia
- Region or state: North Sulawesi
- Created by: Minahasans
- Serving temperature: Hot
- Main ingredients: Chicken in hot and spicy spice mixture with much red chili pepper

Ayam rica-rica (Indonesian for "chicken rica-rica") is an Indonesian hot and spicy chicken dish. It is made up of chicken cooked in spicy red and green chili pepper. The origin of this dish is from Minahasan cuisine of North Sulawesi.

== Ingredients ==
The rica-rica bumbu uses much chopped or ground red and green chili peppers, bird's eye chili, shallots, garlic, ginger and a pinch of salt and sugar. Chicken, which may be skinned or not, is then cooked in the rica-rica.

Ayam rica-rica is commonly served with steamed rice, fried shallots and fresh cucumber.

== See also ==
- Cuisine of Indonesia
- Balado
- Dabu-dabu
- Paniki
- Sambal
- Tinutuan
