= Mie cakalang =

Indonesian skipjack tuna noodle

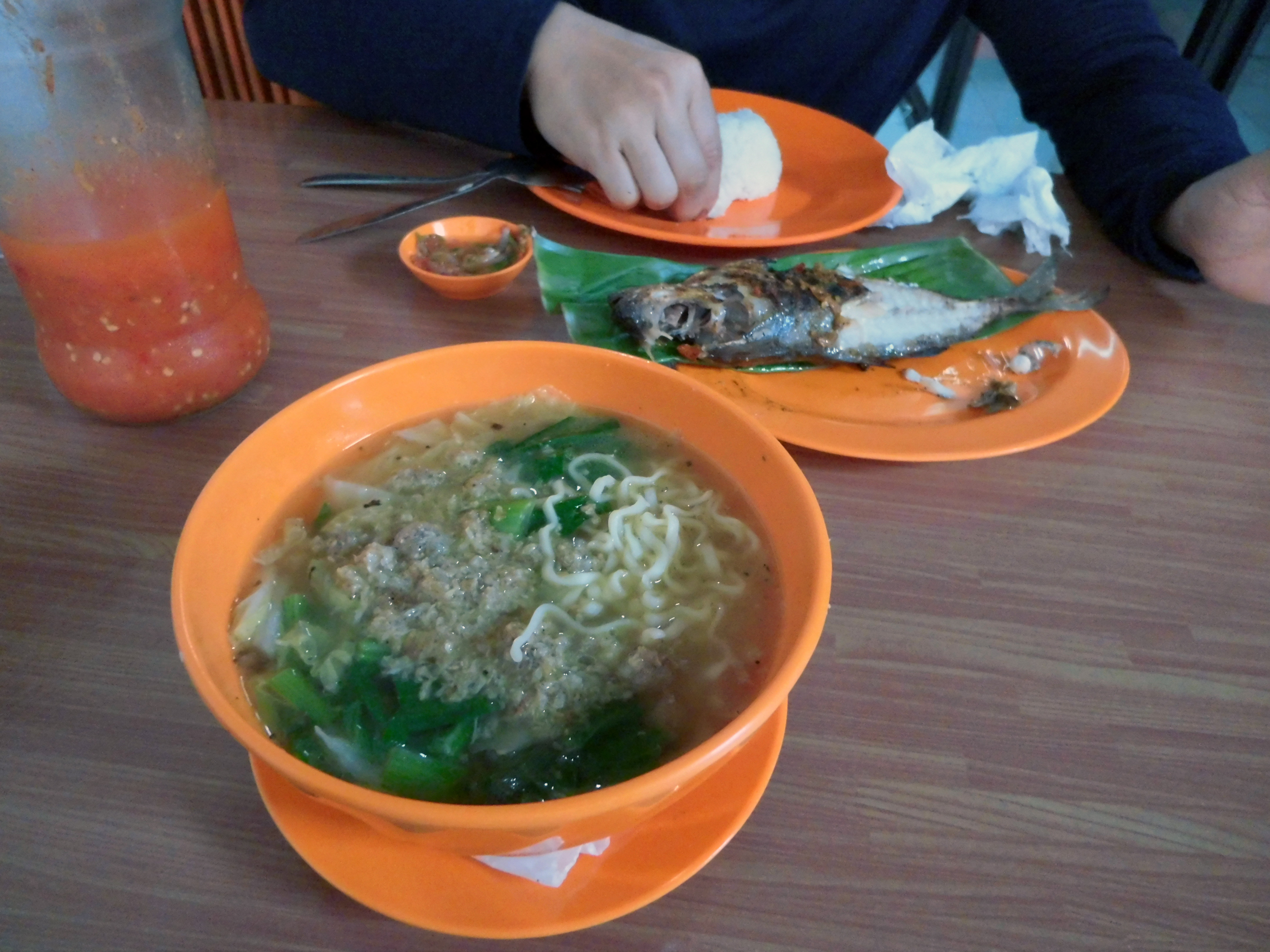
- A bowl of mie cakalang with tude rica-rica.
- Course: Main course
- Place of origin: Indonesia
- Region or state: Manado, North Sulawesi
- Serving temperature: Hot
- Main ingredients: Noodle, skipjack tuna, choy sum, scallion, shallot, garlic

Mie cakalang is a traditional Indonesian skipjack tuna noodle soup from Manado, North Sulawesi, Indonesia. Mie means "noodle", while cakalang is Manado dialect for "skipjack tuna".

The noodle soup is noted for its savoury cakalang fish aroma. Its ingredients includes yellow noodle, skipjack tuna, choy sum, cabbages, chili pepper, scallion, shallot and garlic.

== See also ==
- Mie celor
- Mie Aceh
- Mie goreng
- Mie kocok
- Cakalang fufu
