= Minahasan cuisine =

Culinary traditions of the Minahasan people

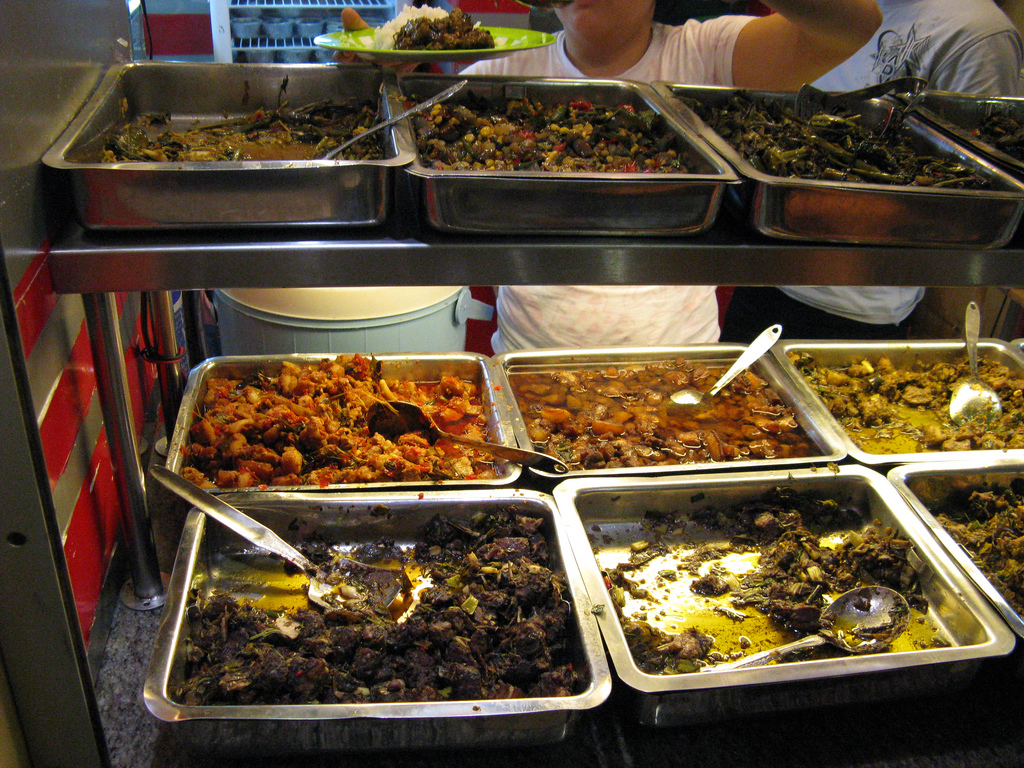
Examples of Manado dishes

Minahasan cuisine or Manado cuisine is the cooking tradition of the Minahasan people of North Sulawesi, Indonesia. It is popularly known as "Manadonese cuisine" after Manado, the capital of the province, although other cities in Northern Sulawesi, such as Bitung, Tomohon and Tondano, are also known as Minahasan culinary hotspots. Manadonese cuisine is known for its rich variations in seafood, generous amount of spices, extra-hot condiments, exotic meats, and European-influenced cakes and pastries. Popular Manadonese dishes include tinutuan (Manado-style vegetable and rice congee), cakalang fufu (smoked skipjack tuna), cakalang noodle, paniki (spiced fruit bat), chicken or various fish and seafood spiced in rica-rica or woku spices, chicken tuturuga, and brenebon.

Although not as popular and widely distributed as Padang food and Sundanese cuisine, there is increasing awareness of Manadonese cuisine in the Indonesian cuisine scene. Numbers of Manadonese restaurants are growing in Indonesian cities such as Jakarta, Bandung, Medan, Surabaya and Makassar.

== Traditions and influences ==
Manadonese cuisine is marked by a mixture of native and foreign influences. Native Minahasan cooking tradition relies heavily on seafood as well as exotic bushmeats, and its heavy use of freshly chopped hot spices. It also demonstrates Chinese and Western influences (especially Portuguese/Spanish and Dutch), most prominent in soups, cakes, and pastries.

Chicken and beef are commonly consumed. A significant number of Minahasans are Christians; the halal dietary law has thus not played an important role in the cuisine's development as it has for the Minahasans' Muslim neighbors on the Sulawesi island (the Gorontalos and Northern Maluku people). Pork, wild boar, and even dog meat and bat are hence more ubiquitous in Manadonese cuisine compared to other culinary traditions in the Indonesian archipelago.

== Spices ==
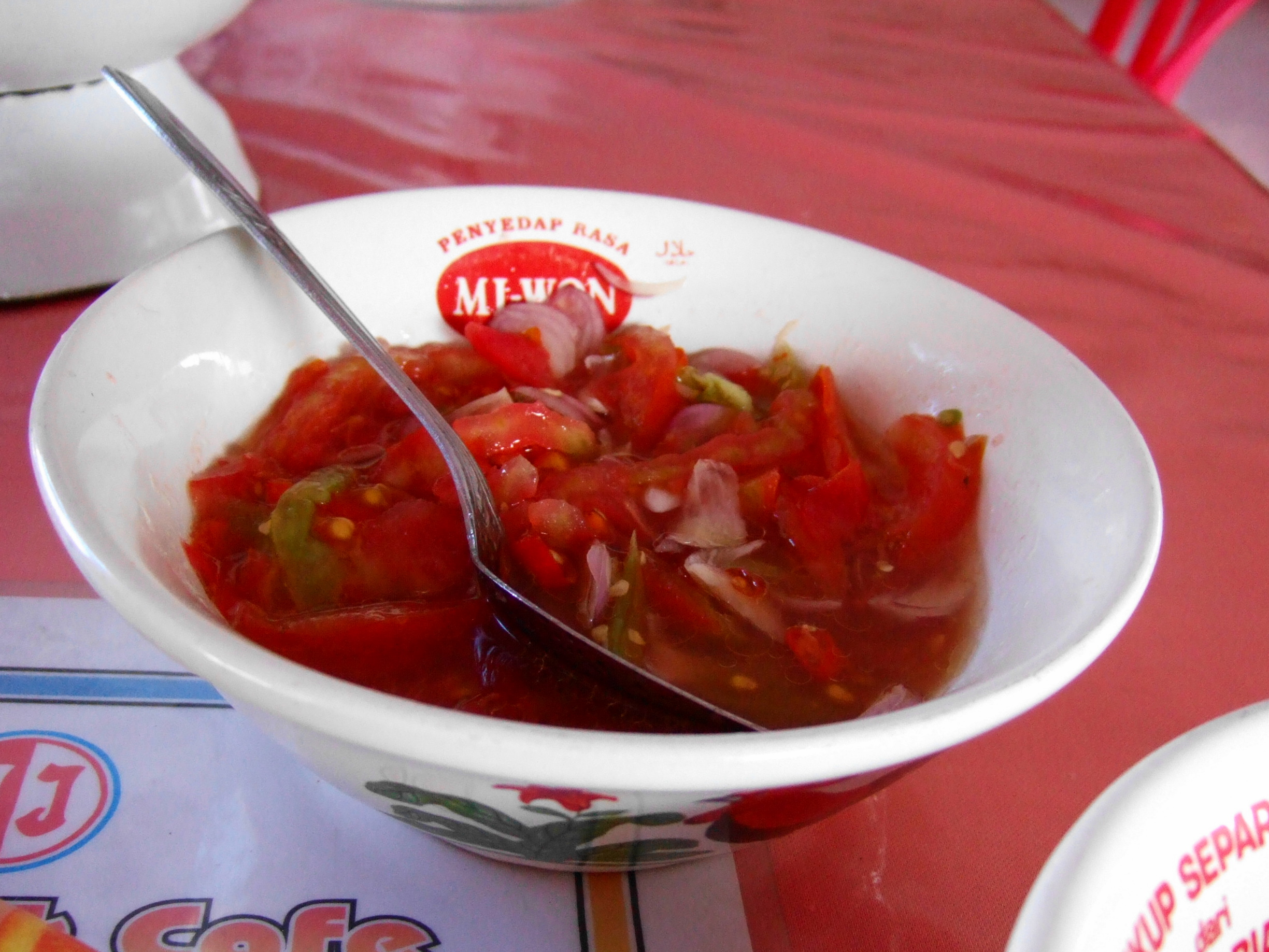
Hot and spicy dabu-dabu condiment

Manadonese cuisine is well known for its generous use of spices, sometimes making up more than half of the whole dish's ingredients. It has given the cuisine the reputation of being hot and spicy, often from the freshly chopped chili peppers added in. Common spices used in Manadonese cuisine include lemongrass, kaffir lime leaves, lime juice, chili peppers, spring onions, shallots, garlic, cloves and candlenut. Seafood, pork and chicken are often cooked in Manadonese signature bumbu (spice blends), such as rica-rica and woku. Spicy condiments are also served as dipping sauce for seafood, such as dabu-dabu and sambal roa.

== Cakes and pastries ==
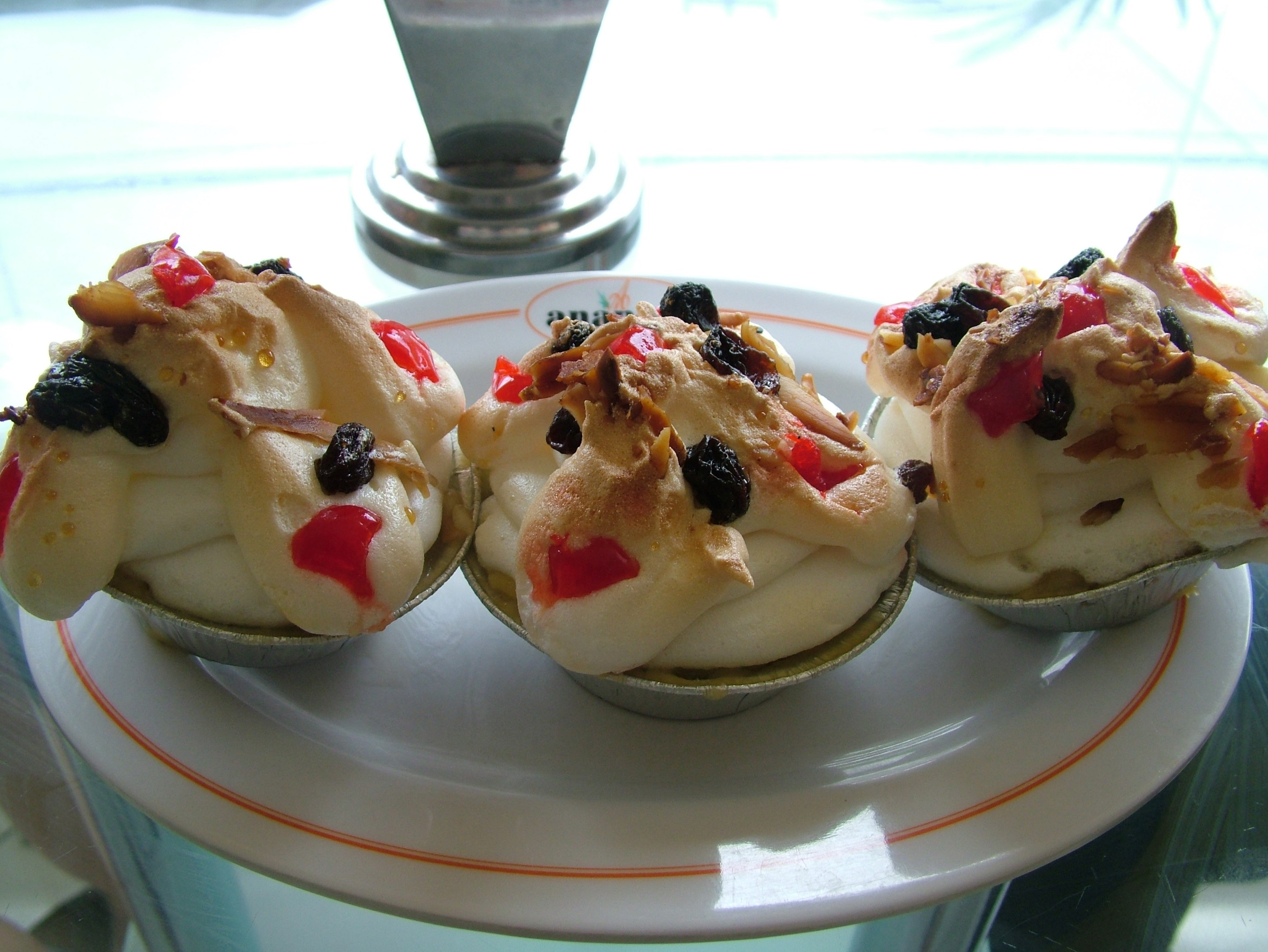
Klappertaart or coconut custard

Among Indonesian ethnicities, Minahasans are well known for their affinities with European culture. A number of European-influenced cakes and pastries made their way into the Minahasan kitchen. The most notable probably is klappertaart (from Dutch language, lit. coconut tart). Another example is panada, a Portuguese-influenced panada similar to empanadas and filled with spiced ground skipjack tuna.

== Seafood ==
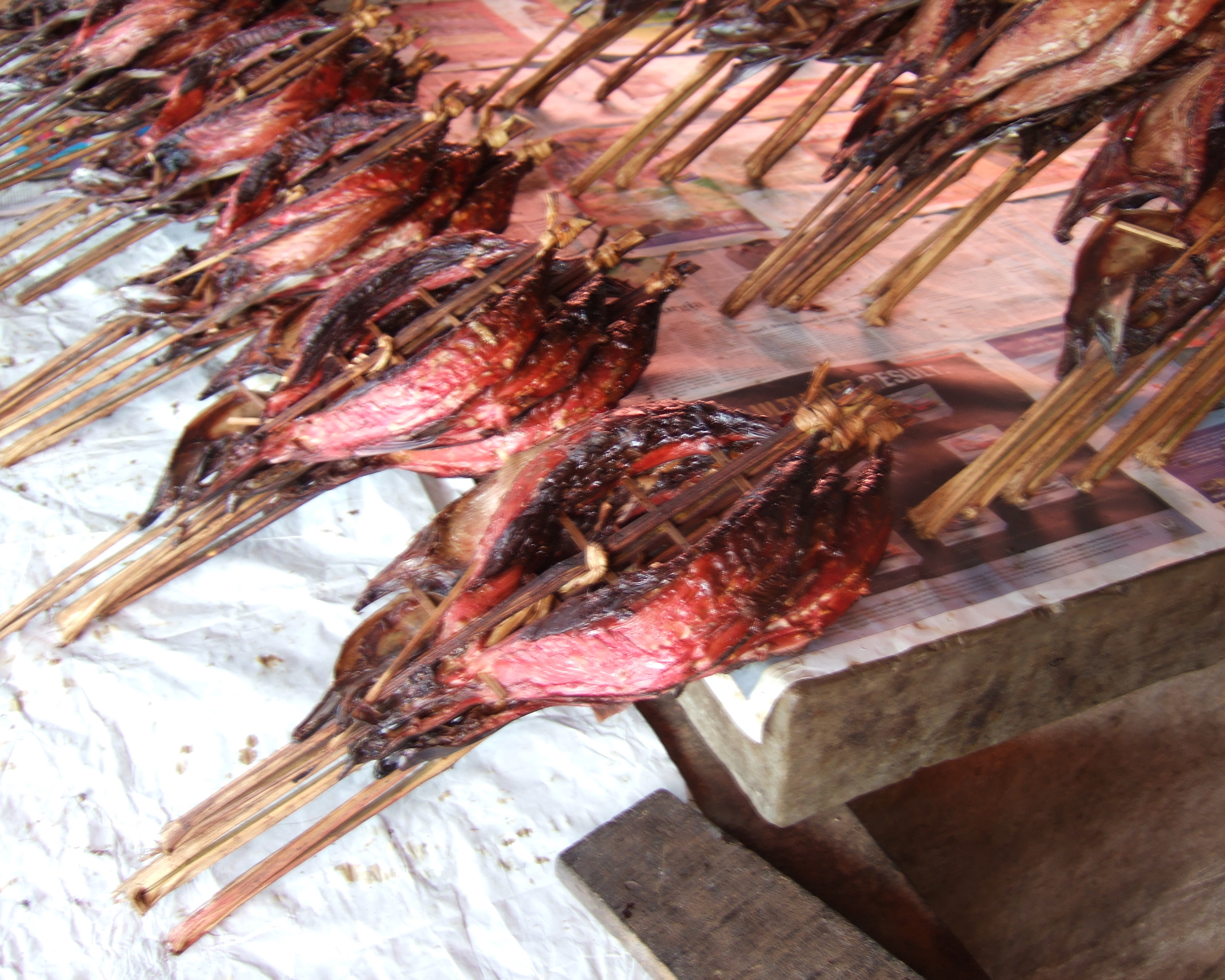
Cakalang fufu, cured and smoked skipjack tuna

The Minahassa Peninsula – the northern arm of Sulawesi, a narrow peninsula that formed the North Sulawesi and Gorontalo provinces – is surrounded by seas on almost all sides. The Sulawesi Sea, Maluku Sea, and Gulf of Tomini have been fished by the Minahasan people for generations, and seafood has thus become a staple diet in Manado. The harbor cities of Manado and Bitung are the center of the fishing industry in the area.

Various seafood such as cakalang (skipjack tuna), tude (mackerel), oci (larger mackerel), tuna, albacore, bobara (trevally), kakap (red snapper), kerapu (garoupa), tenggiri (wahoo), bawal (pomfret), shrimp, mussels and crabs are available in the marketplace, often being grilled on charcoal, and served in dabu-dabu, cooked in woku, in rica-rica, or in kuah asam soup.

== Exotic meats ==
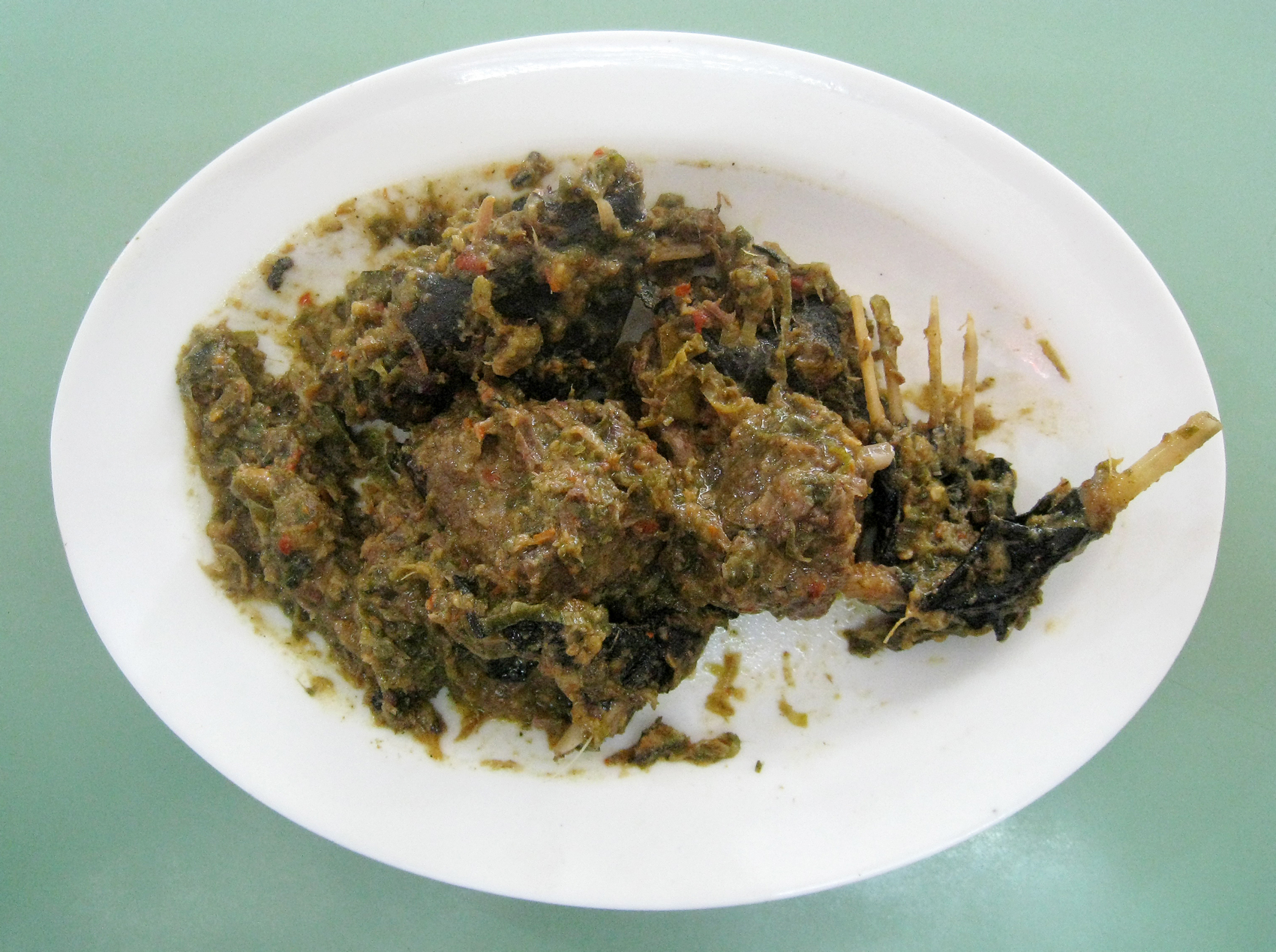
Paniki, fruit bat in spicy bumbu rica-rica green chili pepper

Minahasan people are also known for their bushmeats tradition. Before converting to Christianity in early 16th to 17th century, Minahasans were animists, and their practice on consuming almost every kind of animal still continued until this days. Rintek wuuk or RW (lit. Minahasan: "fine hair") is euphemism of dog meat. In Minahasan culture it is considered prestigious to consume rare and unusual meats. The marketplaces of the mountainous town of Tomohon and Tondano are notorious for selling various kinds of exotic bushmeats; from wild boar, field rats, patola snake (python), frog legs, paniki or fruit bats, and dog meat. Sometimes protected endangered animals such as yaki (Sulawesi black macaque), kuse (slow loris), tapir and anoa are illegally sold in marketplace as food.

== List of dishes ==
=== Dishes ===
| Local name | Image | English name | Notes |
|---|---|---|---|
| Cakalang fufu | | Smoked skipjack tuna | Cured and smoked skipjack tuna |
| Dabu-dabu | | Spicy condiment | Spicy condiment made of sliced tomato, chili pepper, shallot and lemon juice |
| Mie cakalang | | Skipjack tuna noodle soup | Mie cakalang, skipjack tuna noodle soup, a Chinese-influenced dish |
| Nasi kuning | | Manado turmeric rice | Nasi kuning, turmeric rice, although similar recipe also known throughout Indonesia |
| Paniki | | Spiced fruit bat | Paniki, Minahasanese dish made from spiced fruit bat |
| Rica-rica | | Rica-rica | Rica-rica, pork, chicken or fish spiced in a lot of chili pepper |
| Rintek wuuk (RW) | | Minahasan dog meat | Rintek wuuk (RW), lit. "fine hair", a euphemism for dog meat dish, served in plenty of spices |
| Tinorangsak | | Spicy meat dish | Tinorangsak, spicy meat dish usually made from pork |
| Tinutuan / Bubur manado | | Manadonese porridge | Tinutuan, sometimes called bubur manado or Midal (bubur manado with Noodle), Manado style vegetables and rice congee |
| Woku | | Woku | Woku, or its variant woku belanga; Pork, chicken or fish in woku spices |

=== Vegetables and soup ===
| Local name | Image | English name | Note |
|---|---|---|---|
| Sayor bunga Popaya/Sayur bunga pepaya | | stir-fried papaya flower buds | Minahasan style stir-fried papaya flower buds. |
| Kuah asam | | Manado sour soup | Kuah asam, soup of fish or seafood based soup |
| Brenebon | | Kidney bean soup | Kidney bean soup, sometimes mixed with pig's trotters, beef or chicken. Brenebon is derived from Dutch Cuisine influence. |
| Perkedel Milu | | Corn fritters | Minahasan style corn fritters. |
| Rica rodo | | Rica rodo | Stir-fried and spiced young corn, string beans and eggplant |
| Sayor Paku/Sayur tumis pakis | | Stir-fried ferns | Stir-fried ferns |
| Kangkong cah | | Stir-fried water spinach | Minahasan style stir-fried water spinach |

=== Snacks ===
| Local name | Image | English name | Note |
|---|---|---|---|
| Es brenebon | | Brenebon Ice | Sweet red kidney bean ice dessert |
| Klappertaart | | Klappertaart | |
| Lalampa | | | Similar to lemper |
| Panada | | Panada | Similar to empanadas |
| Pisang goroho | | Goroho banana | Fried banana consumed with sambal roa (spicy condiment made from ground red chili pepper and smoked fish) |
| Perkedel nike | | Anchovy fritters | Freshwater anchovy fritters |

== Gallery ==
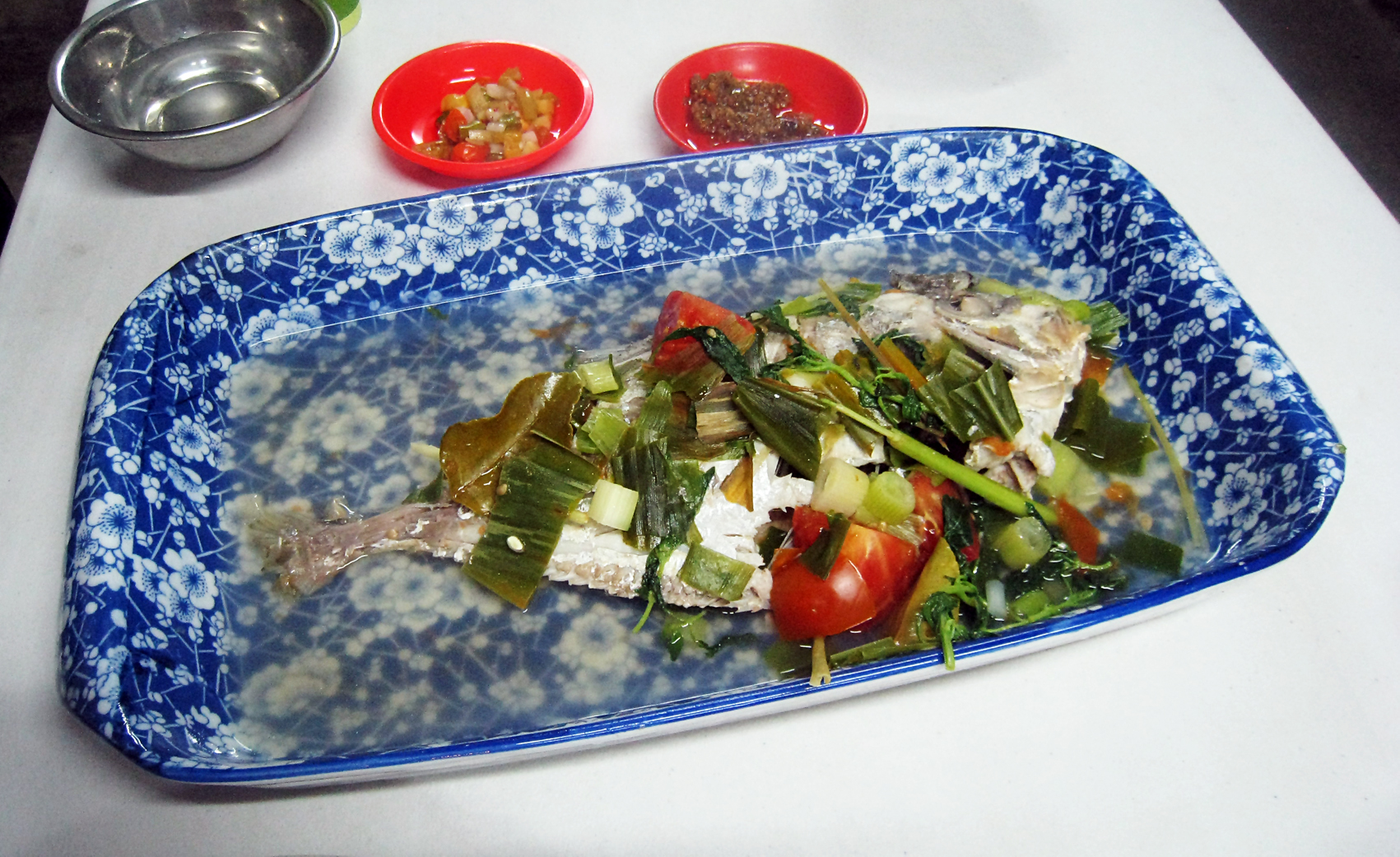
Bobara kuah asam, trevally in sour soup

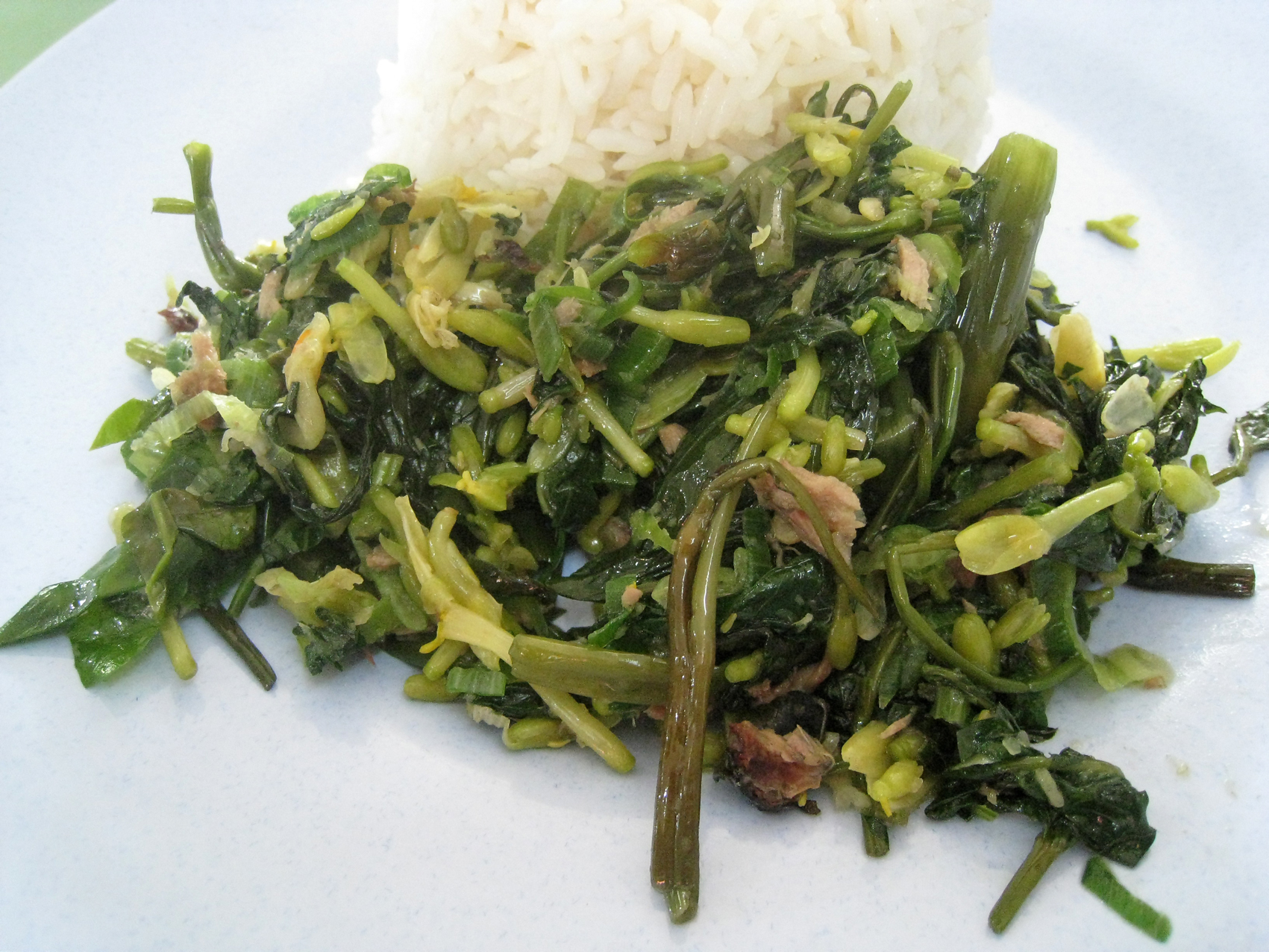
Papaya flower bud cooked as vegetables

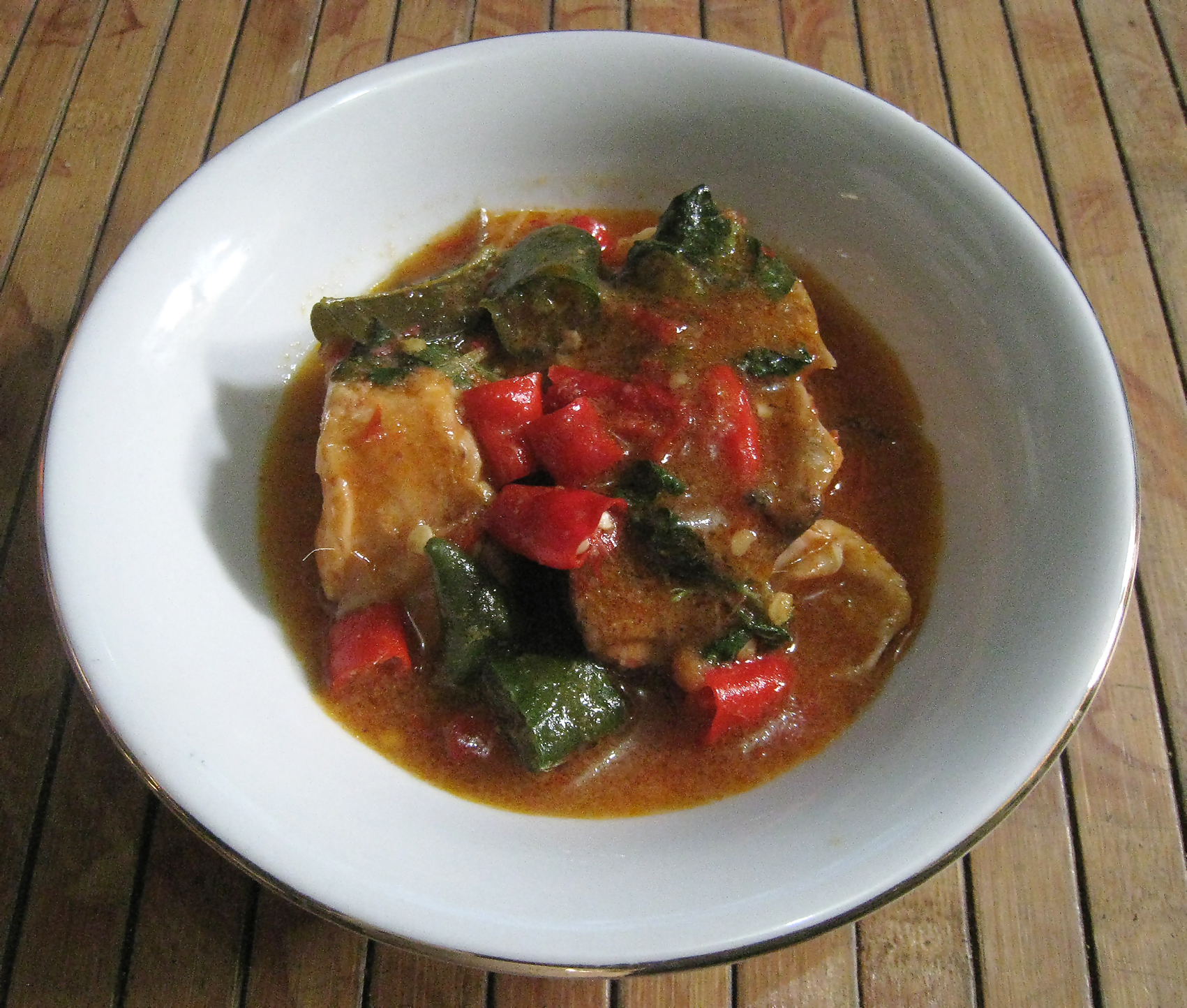
Chicken rica-rica

== See also ==
- Indonesian cuisine
- Indo cuisine
- Batak cuisine
- Minahasa people
