= Brenebon =

Indonesian kidney beans soup dish

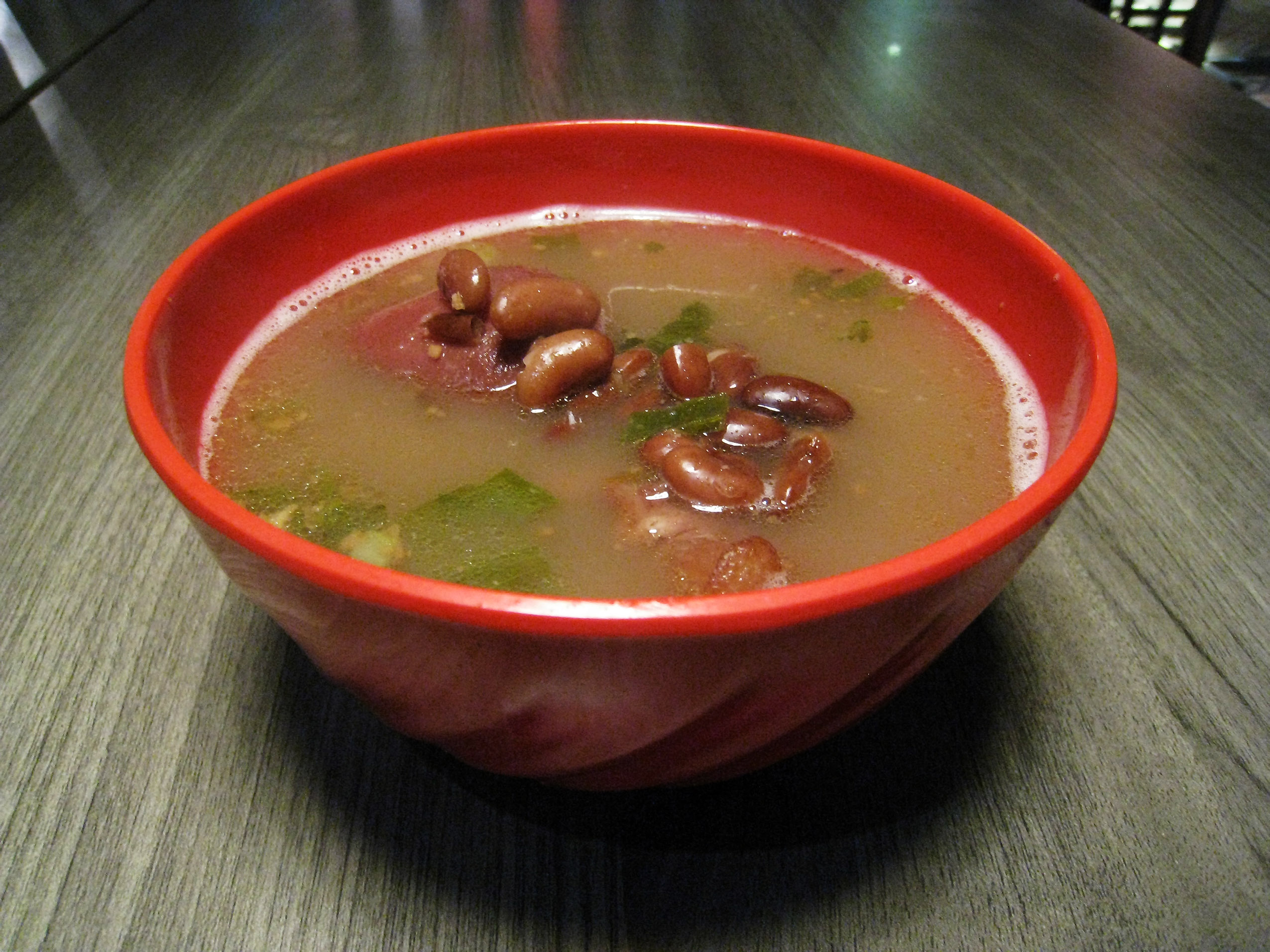
- A bowl of warm brenebon soup
- Alternative names: bruine bonen soep, sup kacang merah
- Place of origin: Indonesia
- Region or state: Manado and Minahasa, North Sulawesi
- Serving temperature: Hot
- Main ingredients: kidney bean, pig or cow's trotters, garlic, scallion, shallots, etc.

Brenebon soup or bruinebonensoep is a kidney bean soup commonly found in the Eastern Indonesia, more often specifically associated with Manado cuisine of North Sulawesi. The soup is made from kidney beans with vegetables served in broth seasoned with garlic, pepper, and other spices.

== Origin ==
The dish is derived from Dutch cuisine’s influence on colonial Indonesia, adopted by people of Eastern Indonesian provinces. The name "brenebon" is local Manado pronunciation of Dutch bruine bonen; bruine means "brown", while bonen means "beans", thus bruine bonen means "brown beans" or "red beans". It is a variety of the common bean cultivated in the Netherlands that is roughly similar in taste to kidney beans, but with a darker and more brownish skin when cooked.

== Ingredients ==
The meat used for brenebon is usually washed and soaked in water overnight. The meat is then boiled until tender. The kidney beans are then boiled in the broth with spices, typically shallot, garlic, salt, sugar, pepper, nutmeg, and clove. Then, vegetables, such as green beans, celery, and scallion, are added. The soup is usually served with steamed rice and sambal.

In its original Dutch and Minahasa version, pig trotters are usually employed as the base of rich and thick soup broth. The rich gelatinous pig trotters gives the broth a thick and glistening texture. Since this soup is also popular across Indonesia, as everyday soup served in common Indonesian households, various versions exist. This includes a halal version, which replaces pork trotters with cow's trotters, ribs, or bony parts of beef. A variant called sayur asem kacang merah uses beef-based broth and tamarind-based soup similar to sayur asem to give it a sour taste and add more freshness.

== See also ==
- List of soups
- Brongkos
