= Klappertaart =

Indonesian traditional cake

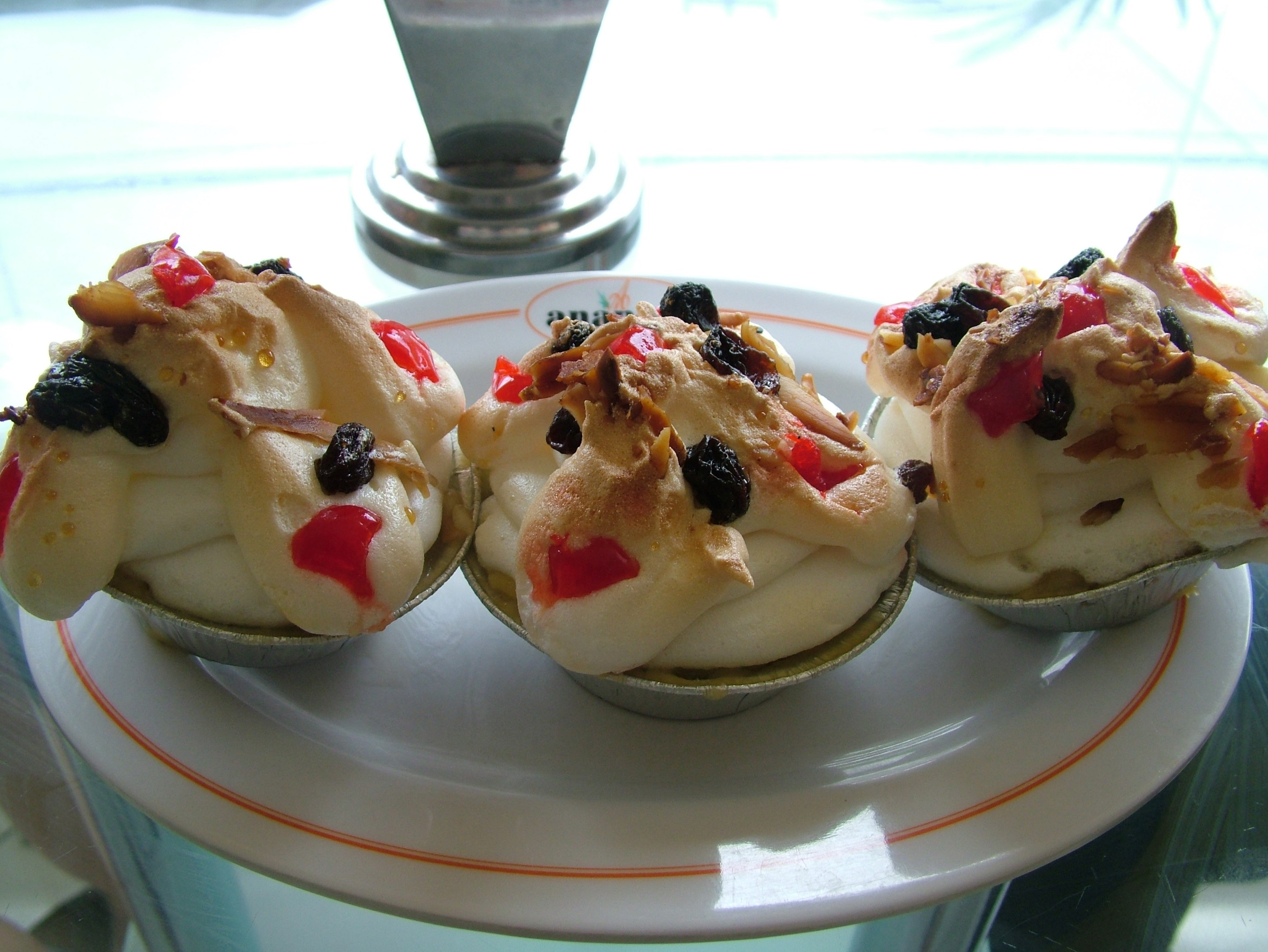
- Klappertaart or coconut custard
- Type: Pastry, cake, kue
- Course: Snack, dessert
- Place of origin: Indonesia
- Region or state: North Sulawesi
- Created by: Minahasan

Klappertaart is a Dutch-influenced Indonesian cake originating from Manado, North Sulawesi. Klappertaart is "coconut cake" or "coconut tart" and it is made from flour, sugar, milk, butter, and the flesh and juice of coconuts.

== See also ==
- Bread pudding
- Coconut cake
