= Mie tarempa =

Indonesian noodle dish

Mie tarempa is a noodle dish that is popular in the Riau Islands. The food was discovered in the Anambas Island Regency. Mie Tarempa is unique for its reddish looks, optional choice of meat, and wide and chewy noodles. The taste of the dish can be described as a mixture of sweet, sour, and spicy. The dish is also considered to taste light despite the amount of oil that is found in the dish. The dish is considered to be affordable by the locals. The word “Mie'' derives from the Indonesian language, meaning noodles. The name “Tarempa” is known as a small town that is located in the Anambas Regency.

== Ingredients ==
The dish is simple to cook and requires simple ingredients. Although there are many variations of Tarempa noodles, authentic Tarempa noodles are the most popular. These are the ingredients that are often found in authentic Tarempa noodle recipes:

- Flat yellow noodles
- Tuna, Mackerel
- Egg
- Bean sprouts (for a crunchy texture)
- Oyster sauce (to make the noodles chewy)
- Tomato Sauce (for the reddish color of the noodles)
- Salty Soy Sauce
- Sweet Soy Sauce
- Salt
- Fish stock or Water
- Cooking oil

Ground spices:

- Garlic
- Shallots
- Cayenne Pepper

Complementary Ingredients (Optional according to taste):

- Fried onions make it taste more savory and fragrant
- Pickled chilies to add a fresh, sour, and spicy sensation

== Variations ==
Tarempa noodles are usually served in 2 different ways: dry and wet (with gravy). Authentic Tarempa noodles are usually dry. The addition of gravy is only used for more taste and texture. The taste between dry and wet Tarempa noodles does not differ much. It depends on the taste of each visitor who wants to enjoy the said dish. Besides that, there are also now a wide variation of toppings for the noodles. At first, Tarempa noodles only used pieces of tuna. But now many Tarempa Noodle makers also add seafood and beef toppings.

== See also ==
- List of noodle dishes
