= Kidney bean =

Variety of the common bean (Phaseolus vulgaris)

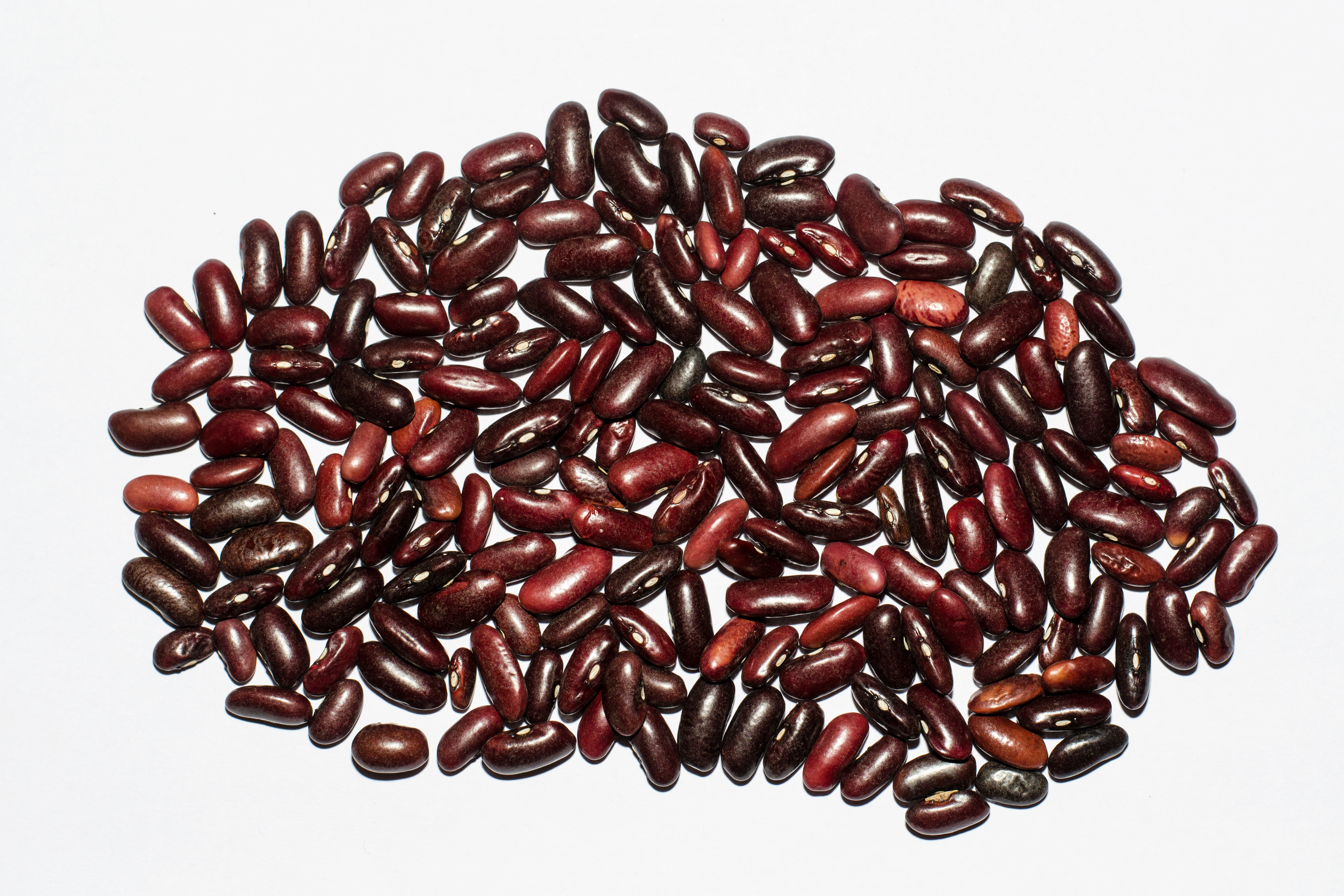
Dried kidney beans

The kidney bean is a variety of the common bean (Phaseolus vulgaris). Its name comes from its resemblance to a human kidney.

== Classification ==
There are different classifications of kidney beans:

- Red kidney bean (also known as common kidney bean, rajma in India, surkh/laal (red) lobia in Pakistan).
- Light speckled kidney bean (and long shape light speckled kidney bean).
- Red speckled kidney bean (and long shape red speckled kidney bean).
- White kidney bean (also known as cannellini in Italy, the UK, Australia, and the US; lobia in India; or safaid (white) lobia in Pakistan).

Kidney beans, boiled
Nutritional value per 100 g (3.5 oz)
- Energy: 532 kJ (127 kcal)
- Carbohydrates: 22.8 g
- Sugars: 0.3 g
- Dietary fiber: 7.4 g
- Fat: 0.50 g
- Protein: 8.7 g
Vitamins and minerals
Vitamins	Quantity %DV^{†}
Thiamine (B1)	13% 0.16 mg
Riboflavin (B2)	5% 0.06 mg
Niacin (B3)	4% 0.58 mg
Pantothenic acid (B5)	4% 0.22 mg
Vitamin B6	7% 0.12 mg
Folate (B9)	33% 130 μg
Vitamin C	1% 1.2 mg
Vitamin E	0% 0.03 mg
Vitamin K	7% 8.4 μg
Minerals	Quantity %DV^{†}
Calcium	2% 28 mg
Copper	27% 0.24 mg
Iron	16% 2.9 mg
Magnesium	11% 45 mg
Phosphorus	11% 142 mg
Potassium	13% 403 mg
Sodium	0% 2 mg
Zinc	10% 1.07 mg
- Other constituents: Quantity
- Water: 67 g
- Link to USDA Database entry
- ^{†}Percentages estimated using US recommendations for adults, except for potassium, which is estimated based on expert recommendation from the National Academies.

== Nutrition ==
Kidney beans, cooked by boiling, are 67% water, 23% carbohydrates, 9% protein, and contain negligible fat (table). In a reference amount of 100 g (3.5 oz), cooked kidney beans provide 127 calories of food energy, and are a rich source (20% or more of the Daily Value, DV) of protein, folate and copper, with moderate amounts of thiamine and several dietary minerals (10–16% DV, table).

== Dishes ==
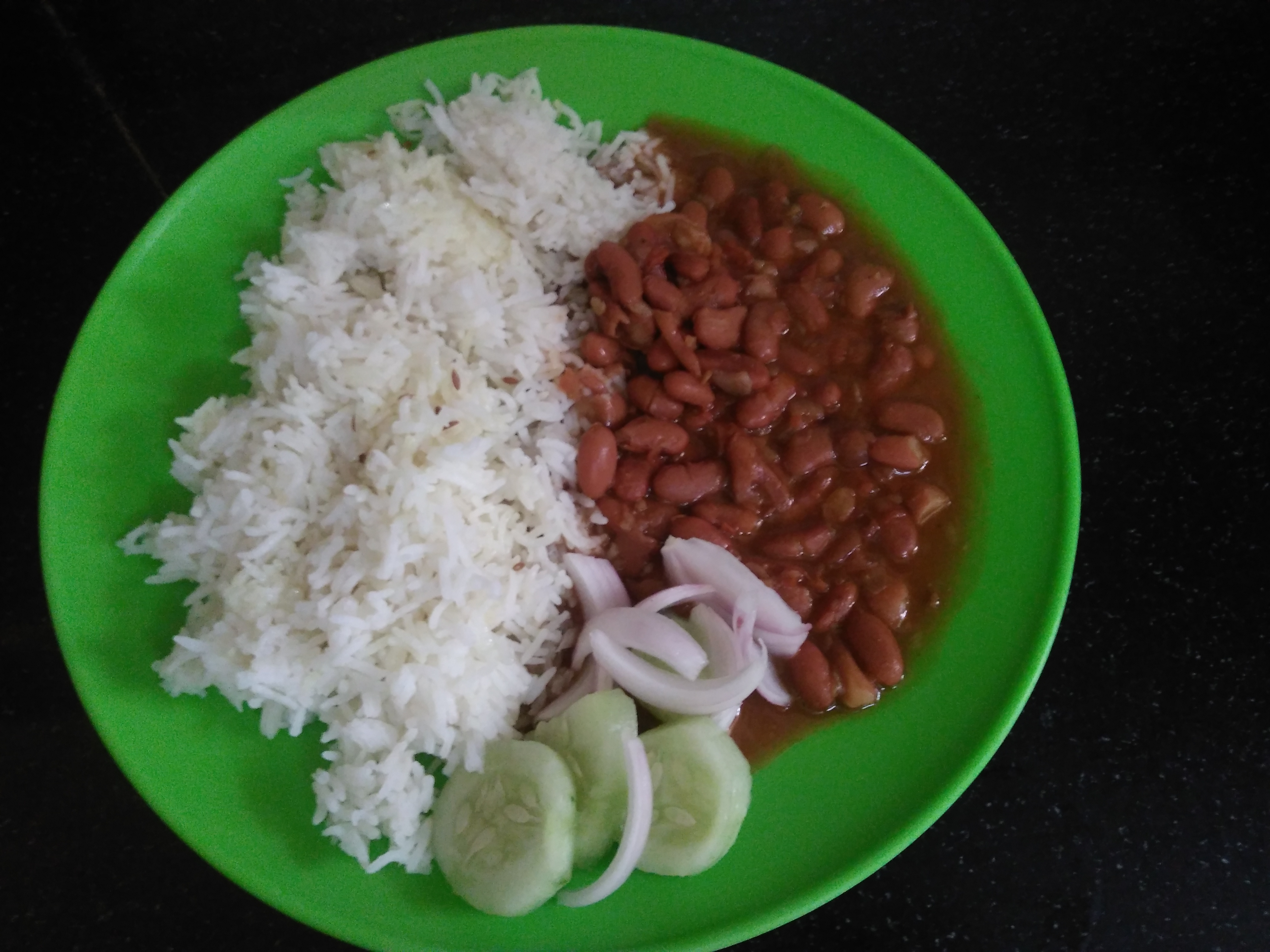
Rajma Chawal—a common dish in north India—comes with rice, and often a side of raw vegetables

Red kidney beans are used in the cuisine of India, where the beans are known as rajma, and Pakistan, where they are called surkh lobia. Red kidney beans are commonly used in Mexican chili con carne and used in southern Louisiana for the classic Monday Creole dish of red beans and rice. The smaller, darker red beans are also used, particularly in Louisiana families with a recent Caribbean heritage. In Jamaica, they are referred to as "red peas". Small kidney beans used in La Rioja, Spain, are called caparrones. In the Netherlands and Indonesia, kidney beans are usually served as a soup called brenebon. In the Levant, a common dish consisting of kidney bean stew usually served with rice is known as fasoulia. To make bean paste, kidney beans are generally prepared from dried beans and boiled until they are soft, at which point the dark red beans are pulverized into a dry paste.

== Toxicity ==
Raw red kidney beans contain relatively high amounts of phytohemagglutinin and thus are more toxic than most other bean varieties if not soaked and then boiled for at least 10 minutes. The US Food and Drug Administration recommends boiling for 30 minutes to ensure they reach a sufficient temperature long enough to completely destroy the toxin. Cooking at the lower temperature of 80 °C (176 °F), such as in a slow cooker, is insufficient to denature the toxin and has been reported to cause food poisoning. As few as five raw beans or a single undercooked kidney bean (as cooking them at insufficient temperatures increases the level of toxic compounds) can cause severe nausea, diarrhea, vomiting, and abdominal pains. Canned red kidney beans, though, are safe to eat straight from the can, as they are cooked prior to being shipped.
