= Woku =

Indonesian spice mixture

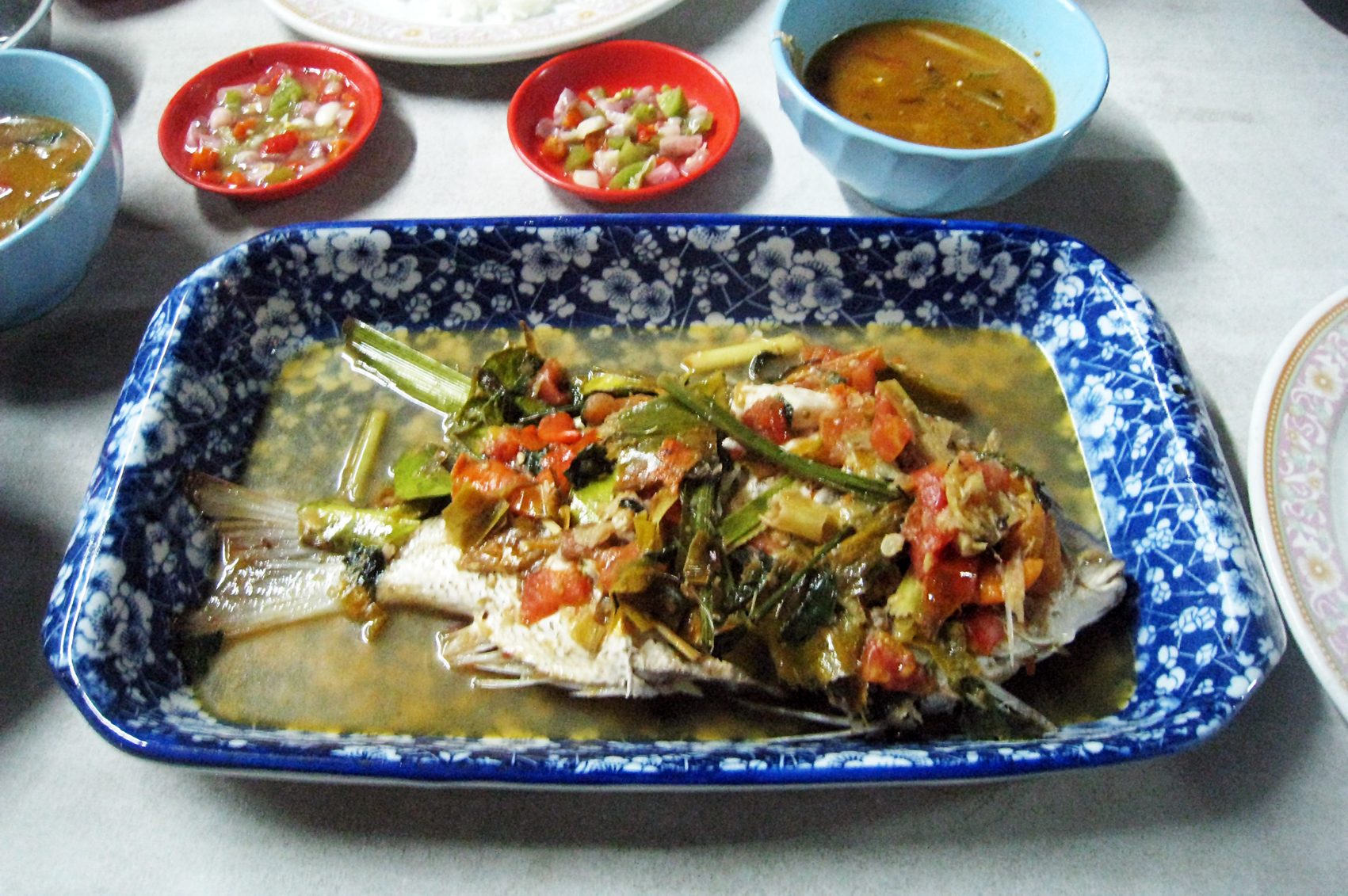
- Red snapper woku
- Course: Main course
- Place of origin: Indonesia
- Region or state: North Sulawesi
- Serving temperature: Hot
- Main ingredients: Chicken or seafood in hot and spicy spice mixture

Woku is an Indonesian type of bumbu (spice mixture) found in Manado cuisine of North Sulawesi, Indonesia, usually used to prepare animal protein sources such as fish and chicken.

== Preparation ==
Woku consists of a ground spice paste made primarily of red ginger, turmeric, candlenut, and red chili pepper, mixed with chopped shallot, scallion, tomato, lemon or citrus leaf, and turmeric leaf, lemon basil leaf, and bruised lemongrass. The dish uses either chicken or fish that is briefly marinated in salt and lime juice before the spice paste is cooked in coconut oil. Once aromatic, the chicken or fish is mixed into the spice paste with water and a pinch of salt until cooked.

== Etymology ==
Woku is an authentic Manado sauce that gets its name from daun woka, a kind of young coconut leaf that is usually used as a rice wrapper. Originally, the initial woku dishes were all wrapped in young coconut or banana leaves before being cooked, much like how pepes or ketupat are cooked.

== Variants ==
Almost any kind of meat, poultry and seafood can be made into woku dish. The most common and popular are ayam woku (chicken woku) and kakap woku (red snapper woku). Woku belanga is a woku variant cooked in a belanga (clay pot) or any kind of saucepan, while woku daun is a woku dish cooked and wrapped in banana or young coconut leaves.

== See also ==
- Dabu-dabu
- Rica-rica
- Paniki
- Tinutuan
