= Cakalang fufu =

Indonesian skipjack tuna dish

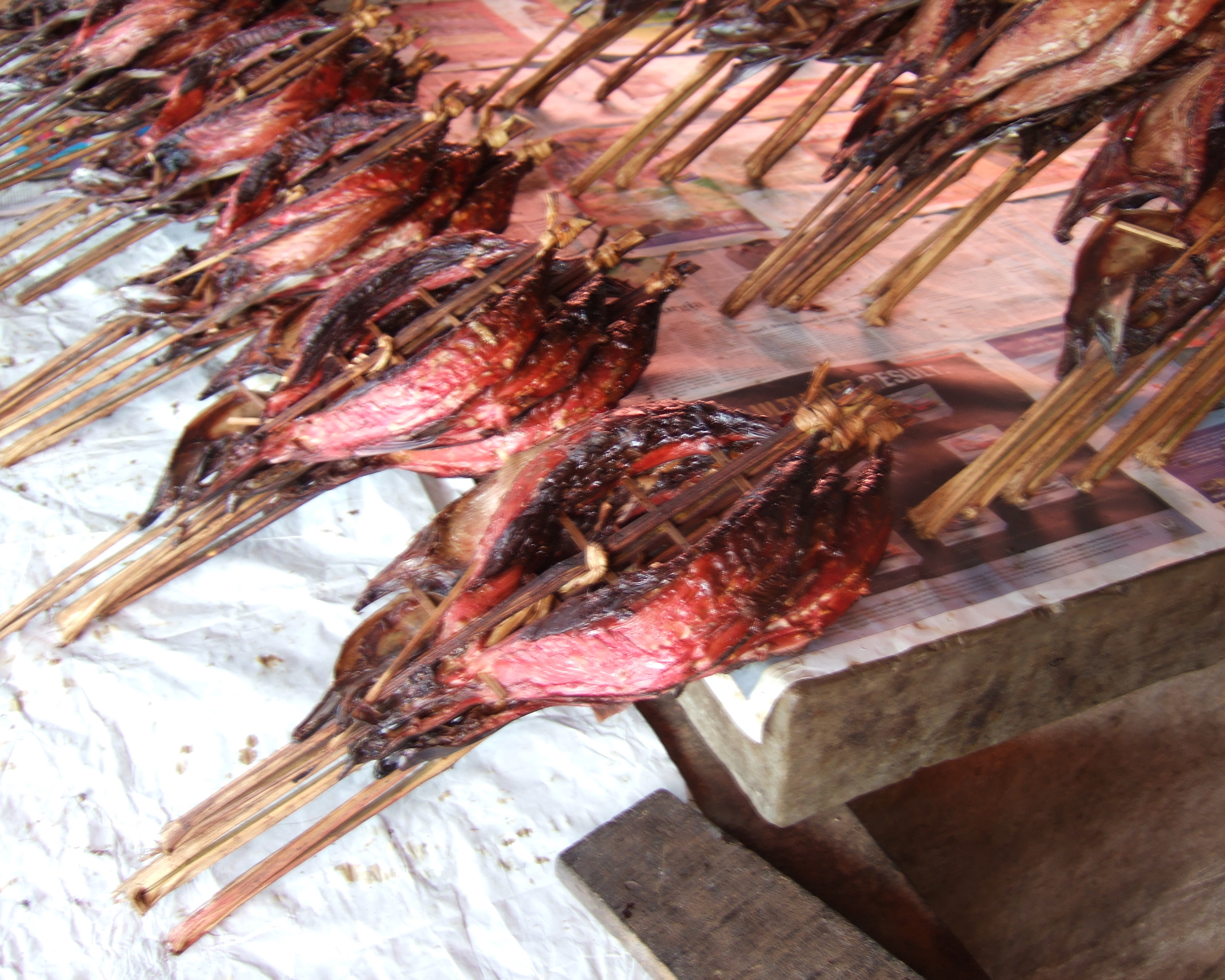
- Cakalang fufu in North Sulawesi, Indonesia
- Course: Main
- Place of origin: Indonesia
- Region or state: Minahasa, North Sulawesi
- Serving temperature: Hot or room temperature
- Main ingredients: smoked skipjack tuna

Cakalang fufu is a cured and smoked skipjack tuna clipped on a bamboo frame, a Minahasan delicacy of North Sulawesi, Indonesia.

== Process ==
After the cakalang (Minahasan for skipjack tuna) fish is cleaned (scaled and gutted), the flesh of the cakalang is split into two parts and clipped to a bamboo frame that has been prepared previously. Then the fish meat is cured using soda powder, salt, and some spices for flavouring. The cakalang meat later undergoes the smoking process; the heat of fire and smoke must be evenly distributed so that all parts of fish are exposed to the heat, done, and dried. The tuna meat curing process takes about four hours and the cooling process takes about two hours. The process goes on until the color of the skipjack tuna turns reddish and the meat texture is rather dry and not watery.

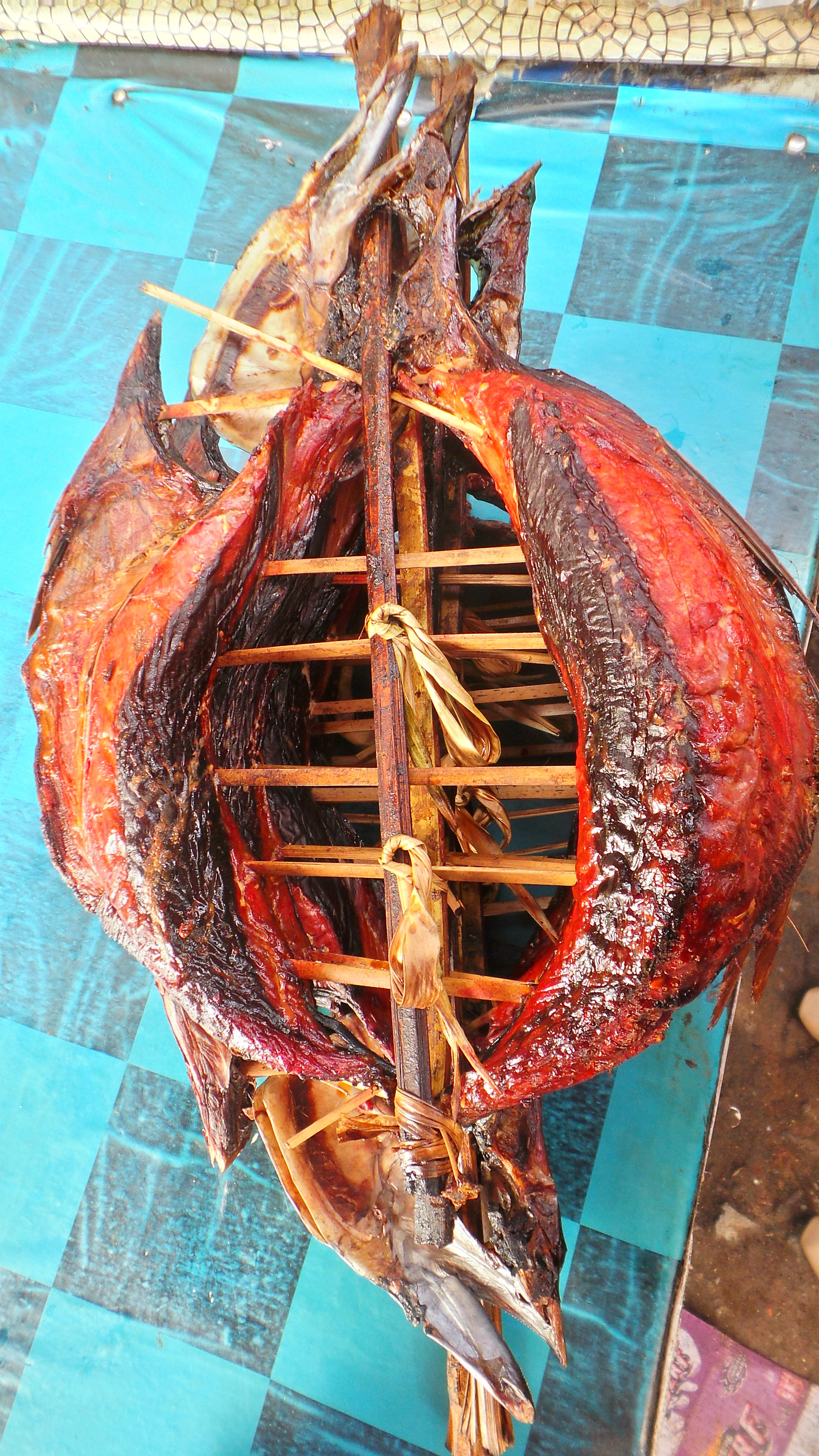
Bamboo frame used in smoking

If processed correctly, cakalang fufu could last for a month, thus can be distributed throughout Indonesia as processed seafood. In North Sulawesi, cakalang fufu is a popular dish and often bought by travellers as gifts. Although it is well known throughout Eastern Indonesia, the main production center more precisely is the fishing town of Bitung, North Sulawesi.

Cakalang fufu can be heated or fried and directly consumed with steamed rice accompanied with dabu-dabu (Minahasan sambal), or become the ingredient of other dishes, such as mixed with potato salad, sprinkled upon noodles or tinutuan, or cooked as spicy rica-rica with chili pepper. It has a strong smoky flavor, thanks to being cooked over burning coconut husks.

== Product distribution ==
Cakalang fufu products can be found in major cities across Indonesia. A common problem for local producers of cakalang fufu is raising the capital necessary to expand production. To solve this problem the Ministry of Industry (Indonesia) provides concessional loans (soft loans) through local governments. Local governments also participate in fairs and festivals to increase public awareness of cakalang fufu.

== See also ==
- Smoked fish
- Smoked salmon
- Kipper
- Bloater
- Buckling
- List of smoked foods
- List of tuna dishes
