= Rica-rica =

Indonesian hot and spicy spice mixture

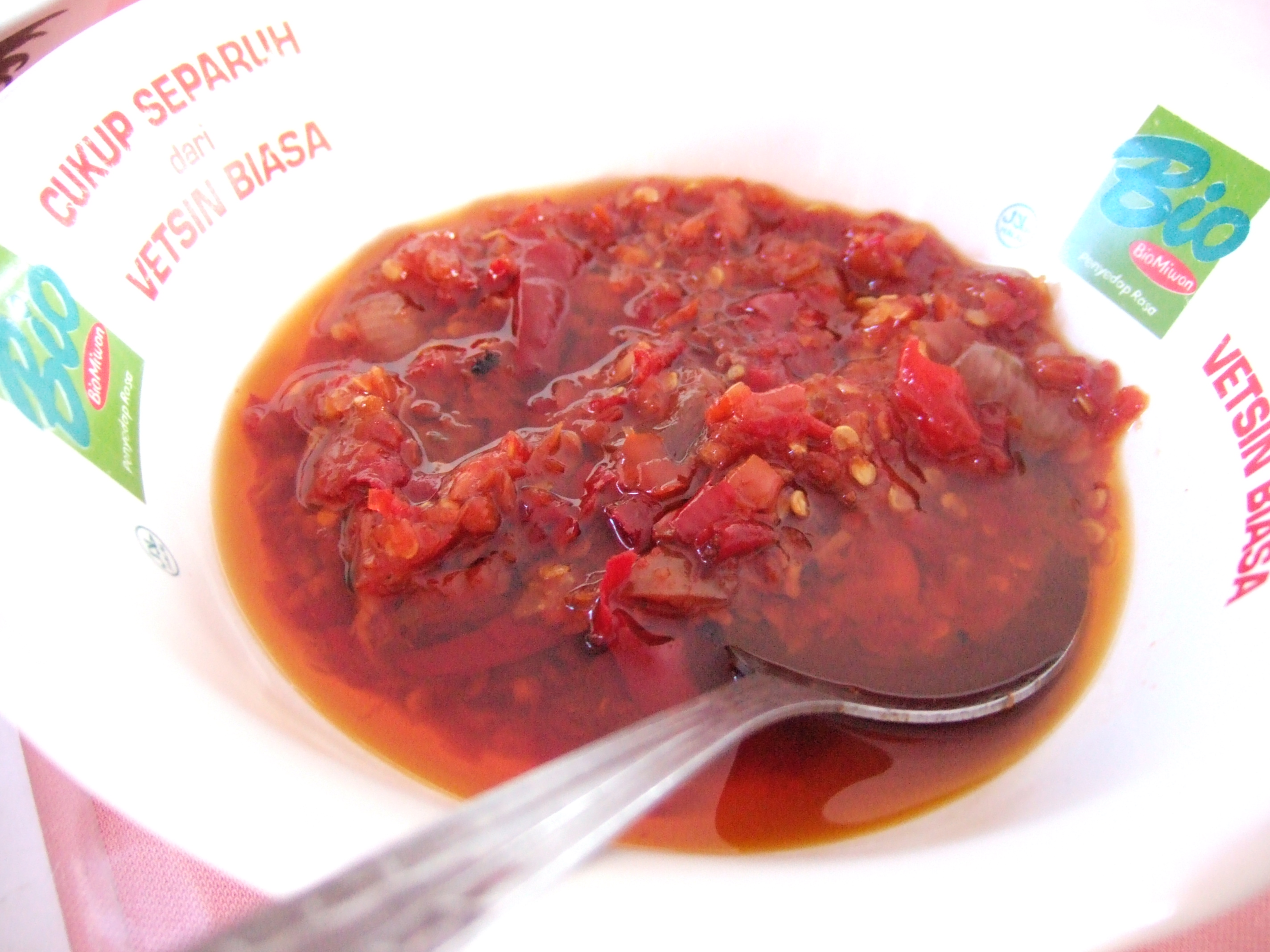
- Rica-rica sauce
- Course: Main course
- Place of origin: Indonesia
- Region or state: North Sulawesi and Gorontalo
- Serving temperature: Hot
- Main ingredients: Chicken, meat, or seafood in hot and spicy spice mixture with red chili pepper

Rica-rica (or sometimes simply called rica) is a type of Southeast Asian hot and spicy bumbu (spice mixture) found in Minahasan cuisine and Gorontalo cuisine of the Minahasa Peninsula, North Sulawesi, Indonesia.

Rica-rica uses much chopped or ground red and green chili peppers, bird's eye chili, shallots, garlic, ginger, and a pinch of salt and sugar. The ground spices are cooked in coconut oil and mixed with lime leaf, bruised lemongrass and lime juice.

In Indonesia it is a popular hot and spicy seasoning to prepare barbecued meat, seafood or chicken.

== Variants ==
In Minahasan cuisine and Gorontalese cuisine, almost all kinds of meats, poultry, freshwater fish and seafood can be made into rica-rica dishes; however, the most popular are probably ayam rica-rica (chicken rica-rica) and ayam iloni.

Other dishes that are commonly cooked with rica-rica are:

=== Minahasan cuisine ===
- Bebek rica-rica (duck)
- Ikan mas rica-rica (carp)
- Sapi rica-rica (beef)
- Babi rica-rica (pork)
- Cakalang rica-rica (skipjack tuna)
- Tude rica-rica (mackerel)
- Udang rica-rica (shrimp)
- Cumi rica-rica (squid)
- Kelinci rica-rica (rabbit)
- Exotic bushmeats such as paniki rica-rica (fruit bat)
- Rintek wu'uk rica-rica (dog meat)
- Ular patola rica-rica (python)

==== Gorontalo cuisine ====
- Ikan goropa bakar rica-rica (grouper)
- Bilentango or bala rica (tilapia)
- Sate tuna (tuna)
- Tuna rica-rica (tuna)
- Rahang tuna rica-rica (tuna)
- Dehu rica-rica (mackerel tuna)
- Ayam kampung goreng rica-rica (free-range chicken)
- Ikan nila rica-rica (tilapia)
Rica-rica dishes

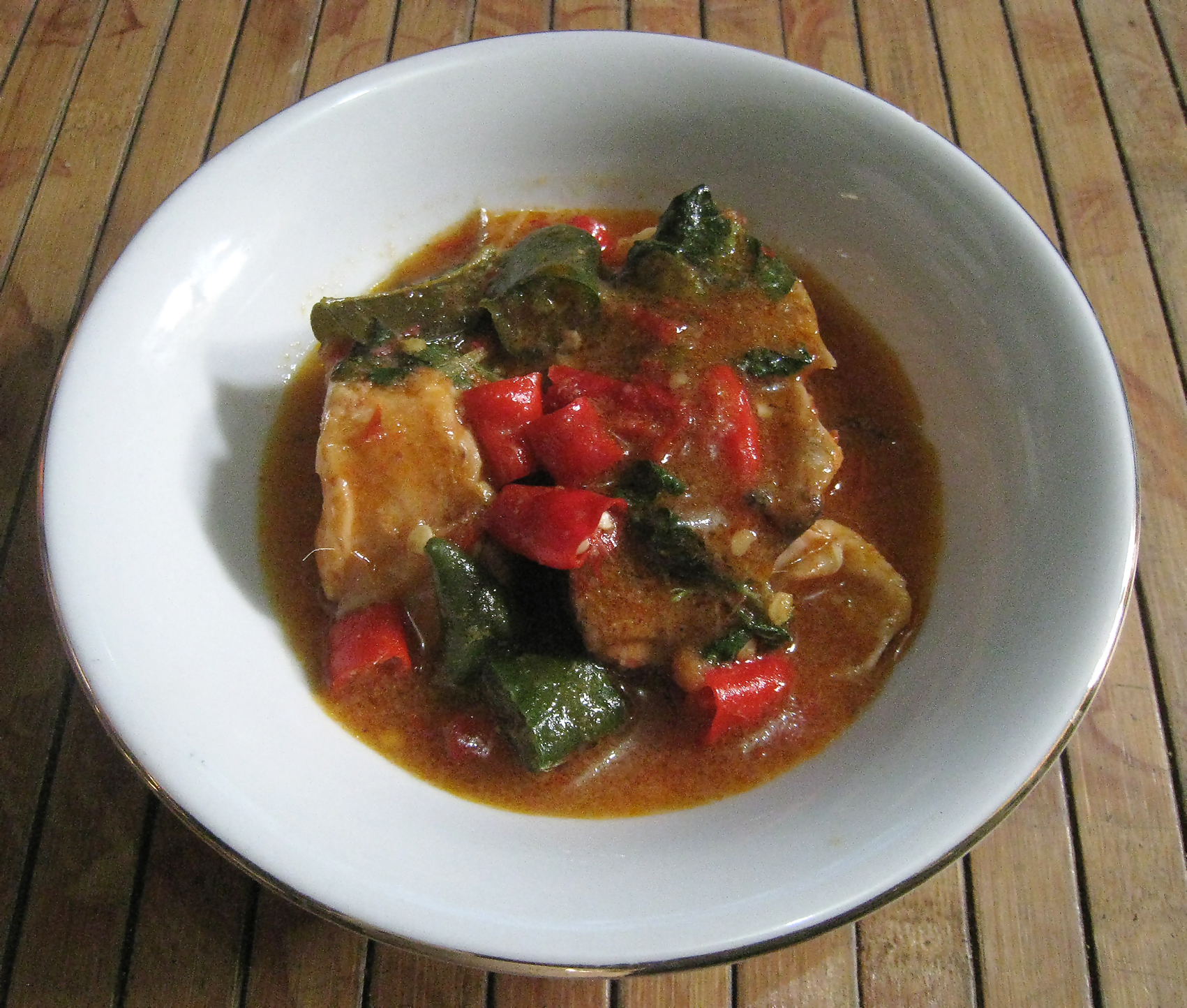
Chicken rica-rica

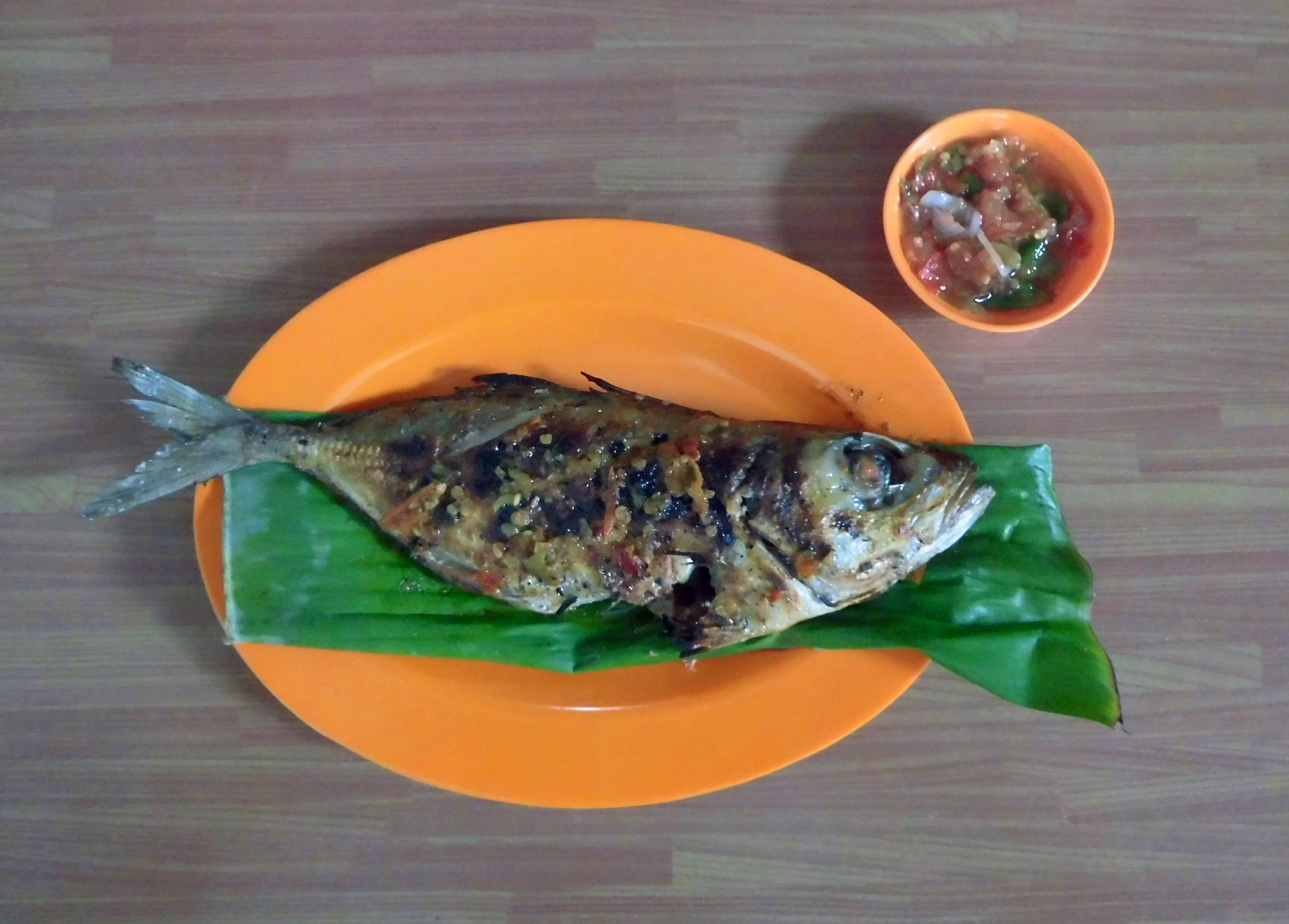
Mackerel rica-rica

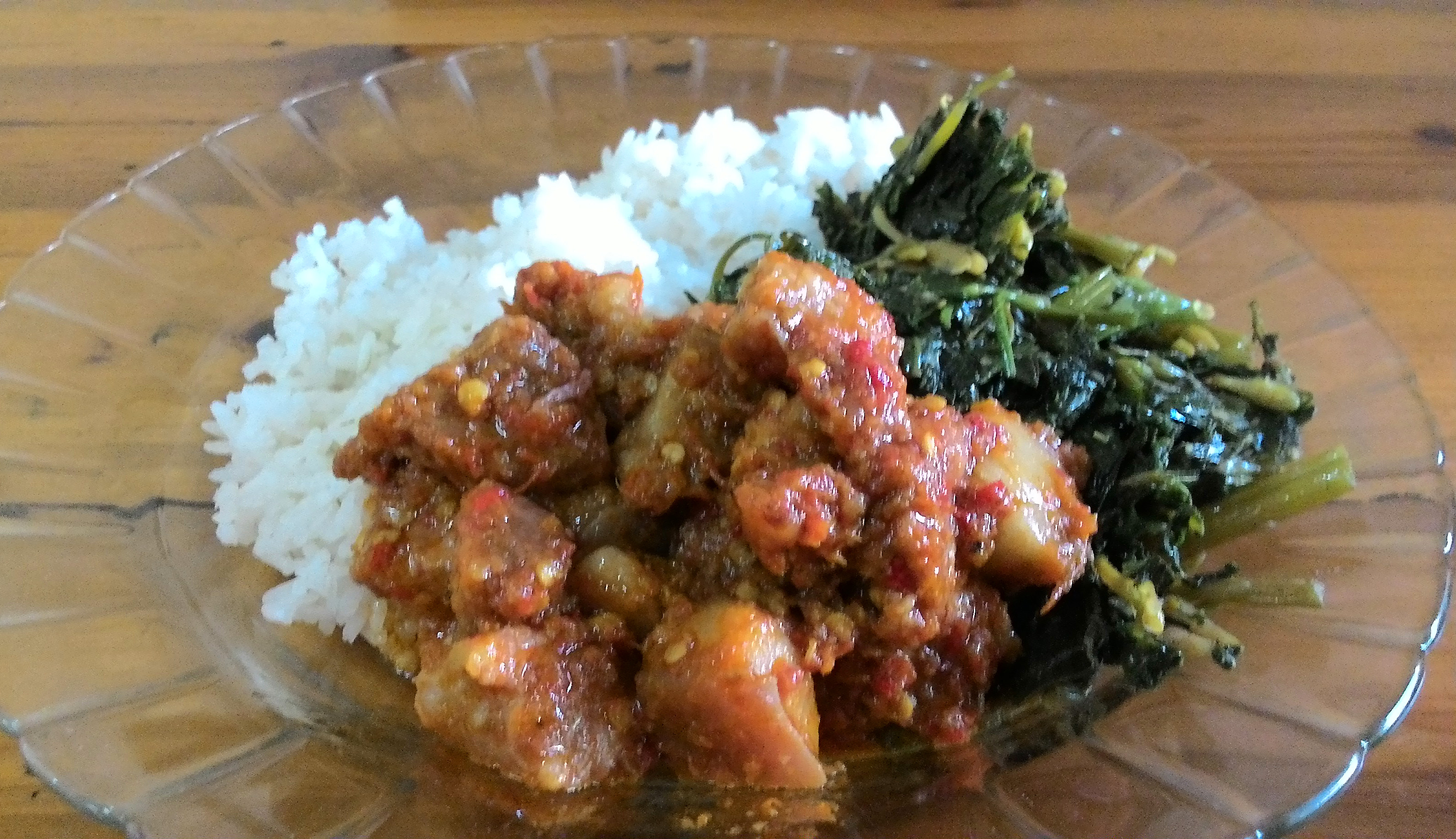
Pork rica-rica

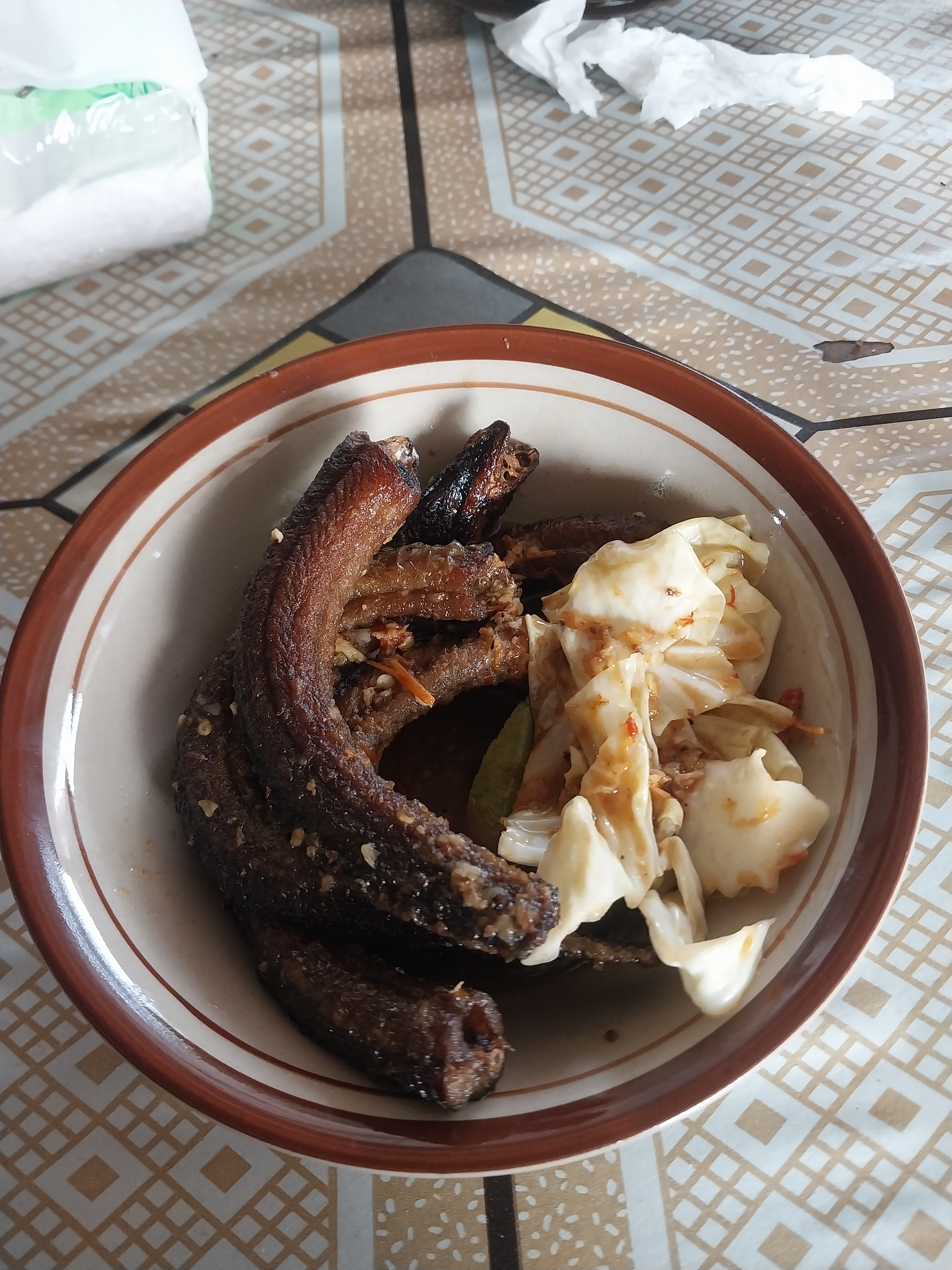
Eels rica-rica

== See also ==
- Balado
- Dabu-dabu
- Woku
- Paniki
- Tinutuan
