= Dabu-dabu =

Indonesian spicy condiment

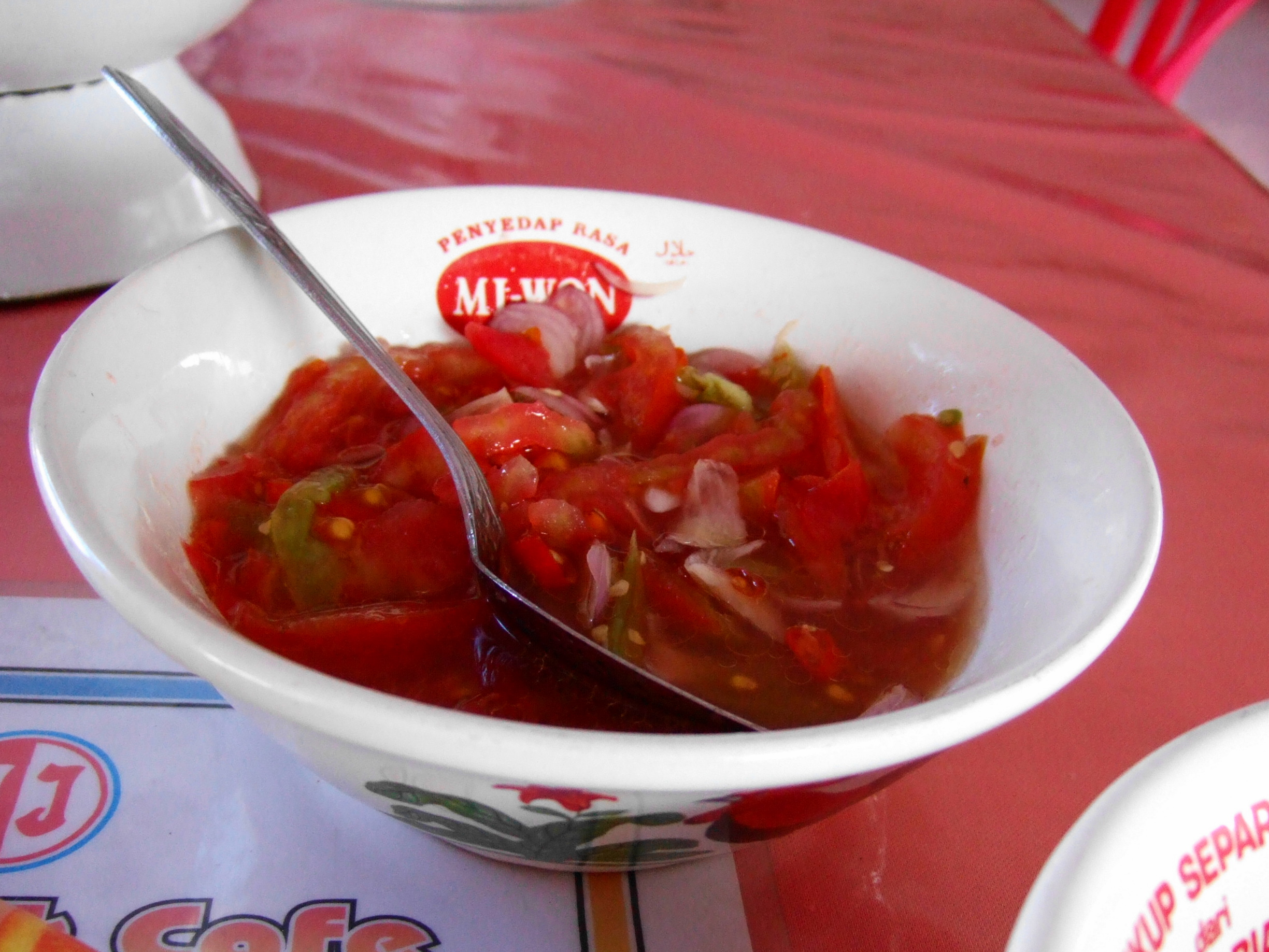
- Dabu-dabu
- Course: Condiment
- Place of origin: Indonesia
- Region or state: North Sulawesi
- Serving temperature: Fresh
- Main ingredients: chili peppers, bird's eye chili, shallots, tomatoes, salt, sugar, calamansi juice

Dabu-dabu is a type of spicy condiment commonly found in Manado cuisine of North Sulawesi, Indonesia. Dabu-dabu consists of diced red chili peppers, bird's eye chili, shallots, red and green tomatoes, salt, sugar, and mixed with fresh calamansi juice locally known as lemon cui or jeruk kesturi, sometimes replaced by kaffir lime or lemon juice. The chili pepper and citrus gives it a fresh, sour, and spicy flavour.

Dabu-dabu is sometimes described as Manadonese raw sambal. It is usually used as a condiment for seafood, especially in various recipes of ikan bakar (grilled fish). It is similar to Mexican salsa.

== See also ==
- Sambal
- Balado
- Colo-colo
- Rica-rica
- Woku
- Paniki
- Tinutuan
- Pico de gallo
