= Tinutuan =

Indonesian porridge dish

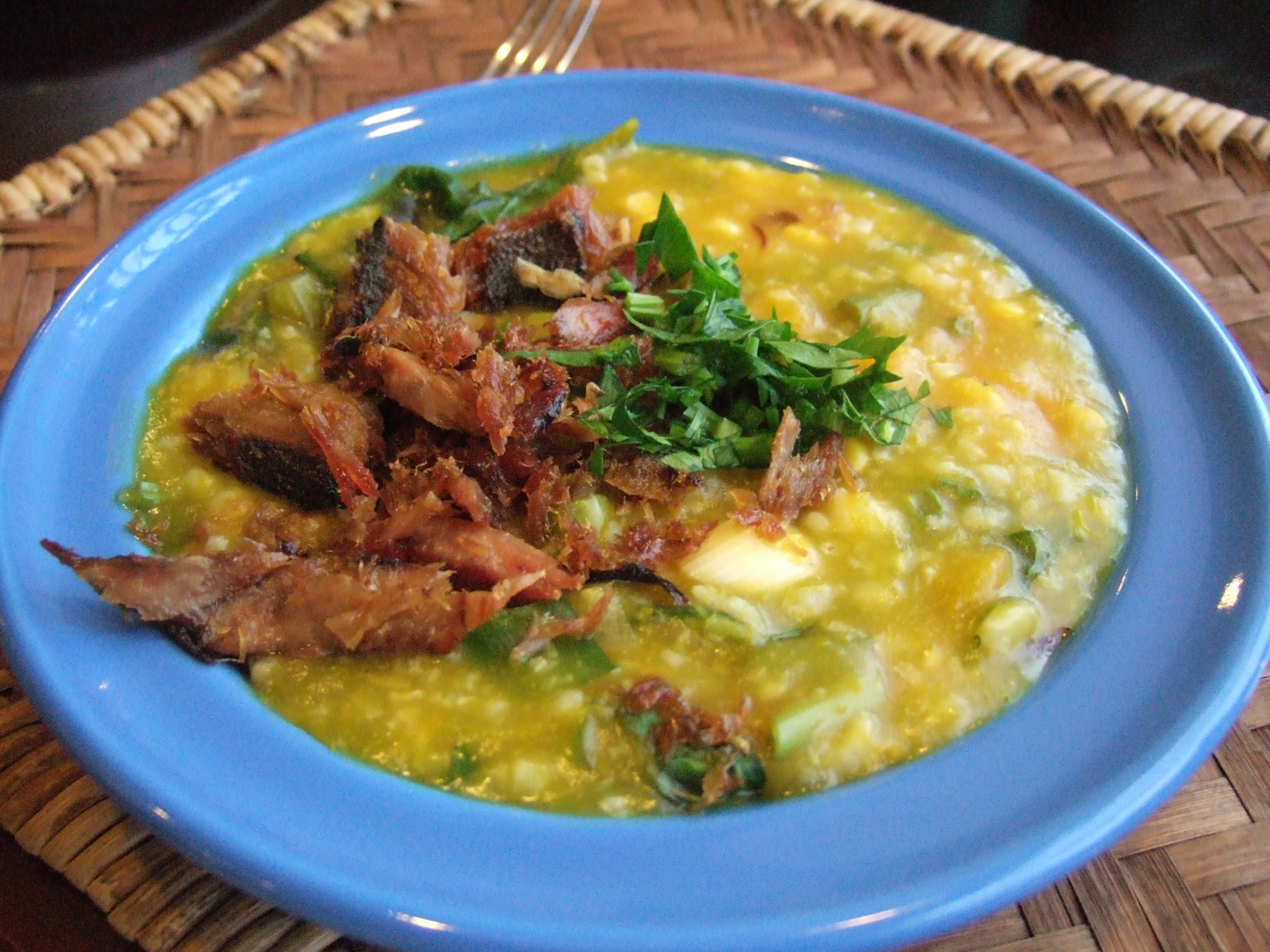
- Tinutuan with salted fish
- Alternative names: Bubur Manado
- Course: Main
- Place of origin: Indonesia
- Region or state: Minahasa, North Sulawesi
- Serving temperature: Hot
- Main ingredients: Rice congee with vegetables

Tinutuan, also known as bubur manado or Manadonese porridge, is a specialty of the Manado cuisine and a popular breakfast food in the city of Manado and the surrounding province of North Sulawesi, Indonesia.

== Ingredients ==
Tinutuan is a congee made from rice, pumpkin, and sweet potato or cassava cooked up into a pulp. It is then mixed with corn kernels and various leafy vegetables such as gedi (Abelmoschus manihot), kangkung (water spinach), kemangi (lemon basil), melinjo (Gnetum gnemon), and bayam (amaranth). Finally, it is served with many toppings that may include fried shallots, fried tofu, spring onions, leeks, coriander, chili, and condiments like sambal, dabu-dabu, and a smoked or salted fish, usually skipjack tuna, anchovies, or nike (a small species of fish from nearby Lake Tondano).

== History ==
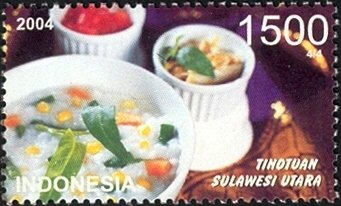
Tinutuan depicted in Indonesian 2004 stamp

The etymology of the word tinutuan is unknown. The exact date when tinutuan was invented is also uncertain. Some sources say it has been popular since 1970, while others date its invention as late as 1981. The local government of Manado made tinutuan an official icon of the city in 2005 and assigned a "traditional food area" lined with tinutuan stalls at Wakeke Street.

At its place of origin, Manado, tinutuan usually served with cakalang fufu (smoked skipjack tuna), shrimp paste or smoked garfish sambal, or meatballs.

Tinutuan with noodles is called miedal or midal.

== Gallery ==
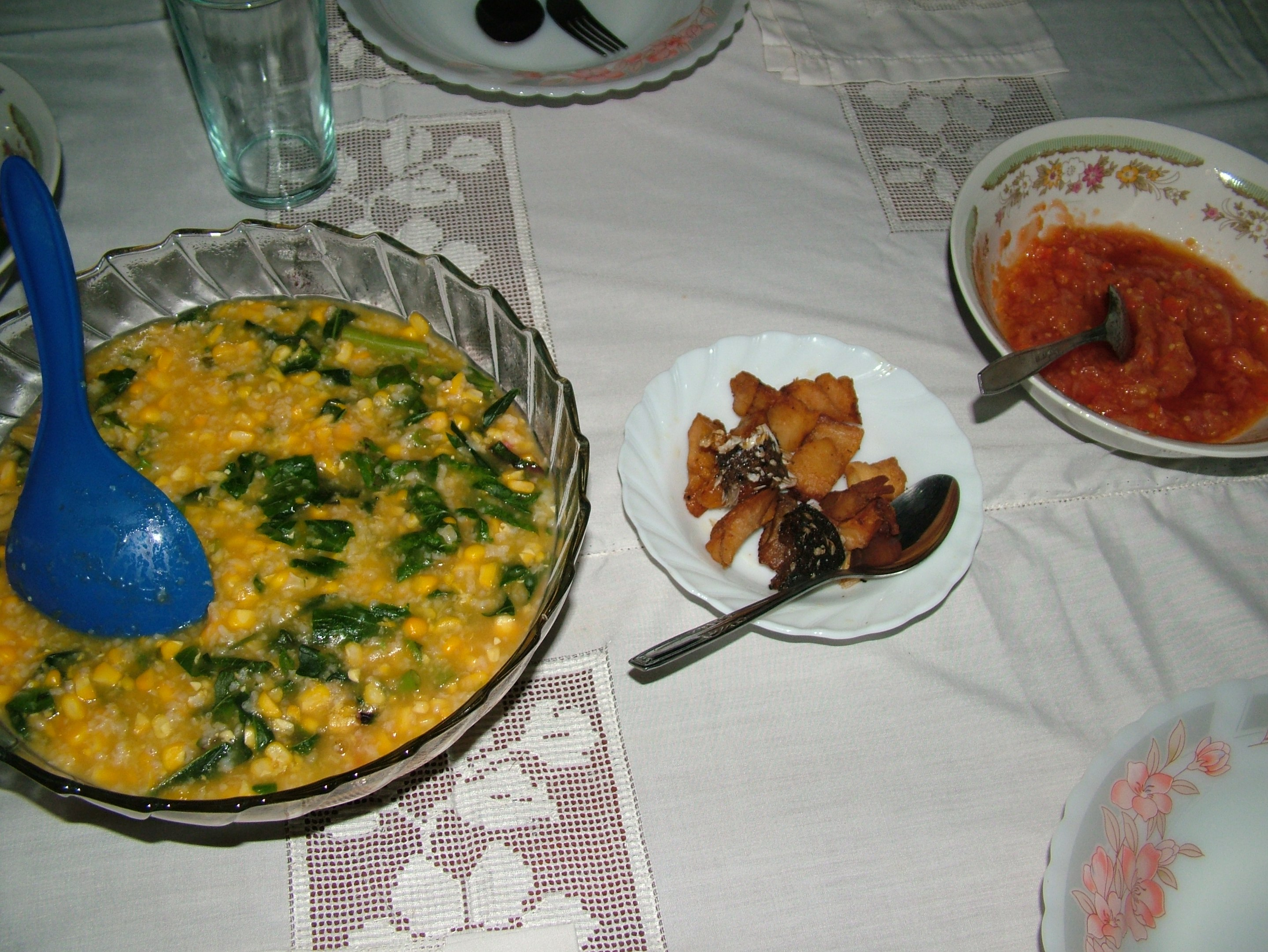
Tinutuan with salted fish and sambal chilli sauce

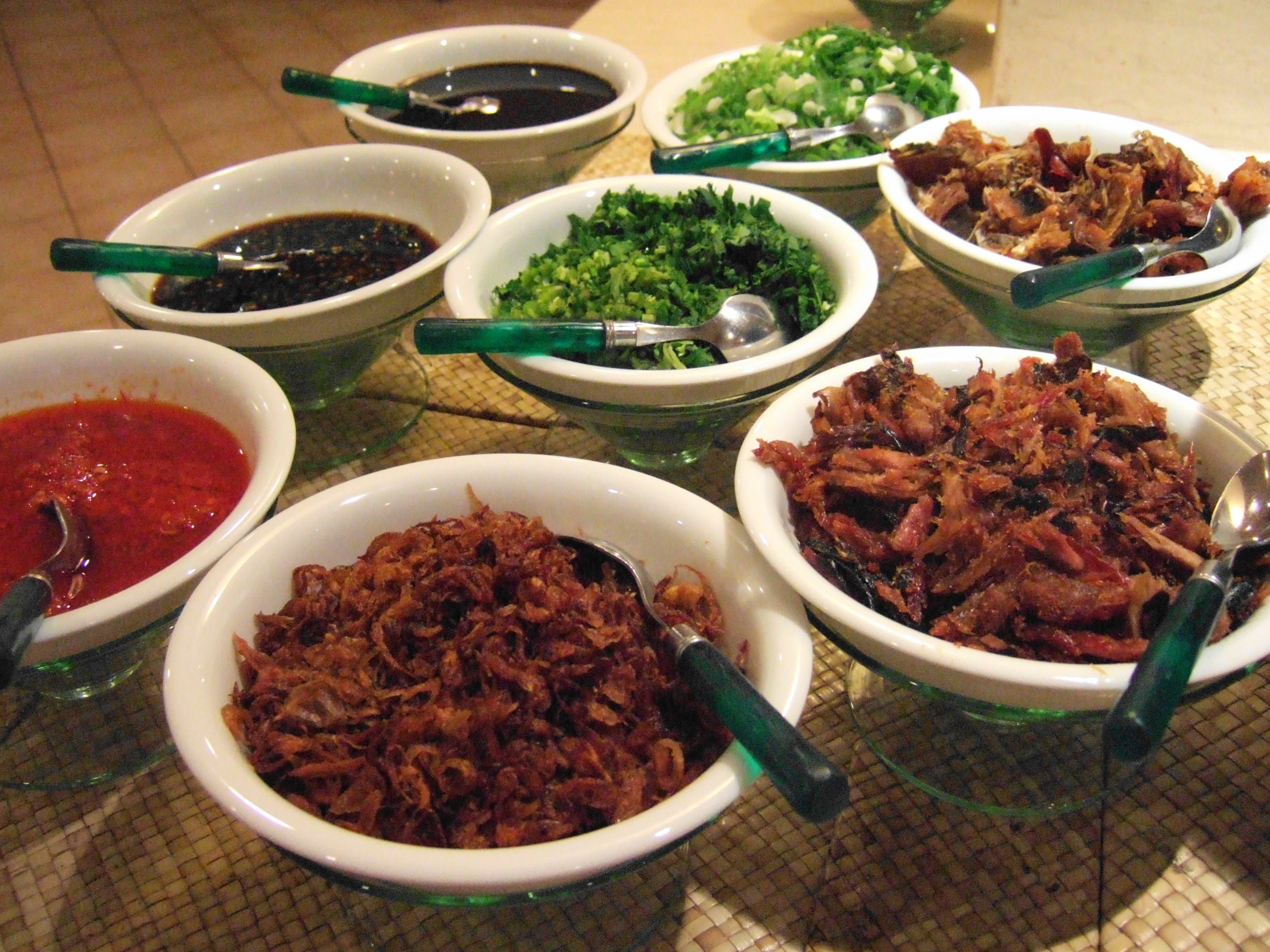
Toppings served with tinutuan

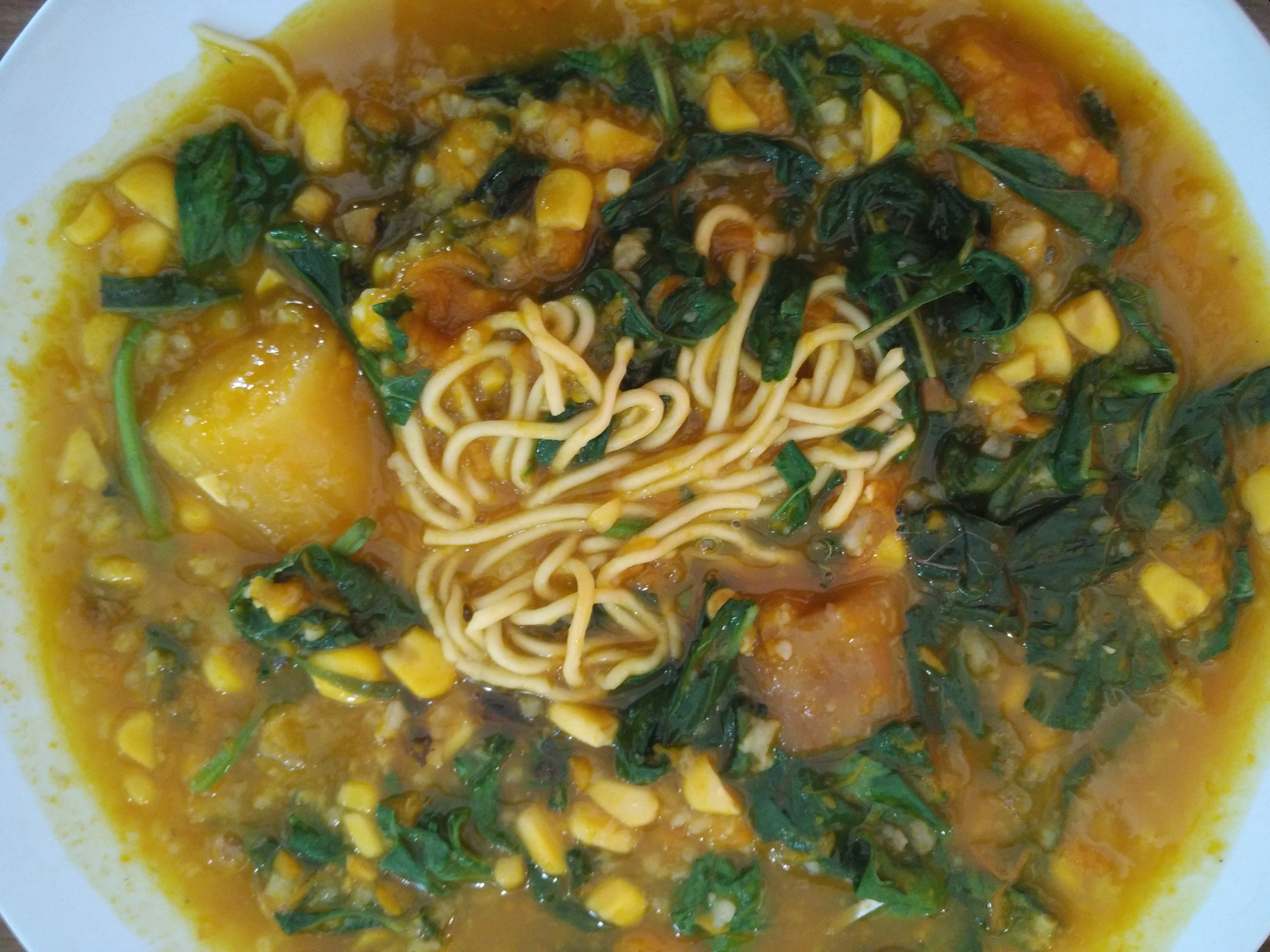
Miedal in Manado

== See also ==
- List of porridges
