= Winstedt =

Winstedt is a surname. Notable people with the surname include:

- Eric Otto Winstedt (1880-1955), British Latinist and gypsiologist; brother of Richard
- Richard Olaf Winstedt (1878-1966), English Orientalist and colonial administrator; brother of Eric and husband of Sarah
- Sarah Winstedt (1886-1972), Irish-born physician, surgeon and suffragist; wife of Richard

== See also ==
- Winstead (disambiguation)
- Winsted (disambiguation)
