= Winstead =

Winstead may refer to:

== Places ==
- Clay, Kentucky, briefly known as Winstead in the 19th century

== Other uses ==
- Winstead PC, a law firm headquartered in Dallas, Texas
- Winstead's, a hamburger chain based in Kansas City, Missouri
- Winstead House (disambiguation), several buildings in the United States
- Winstead (surname), several notable people with the surname

== See also ==
- Wanstead, a suburban area in London
- Winsted (disambiguation)
- Winstedt, a surname
