= Cincalok =

Malay salted shrimp condiment

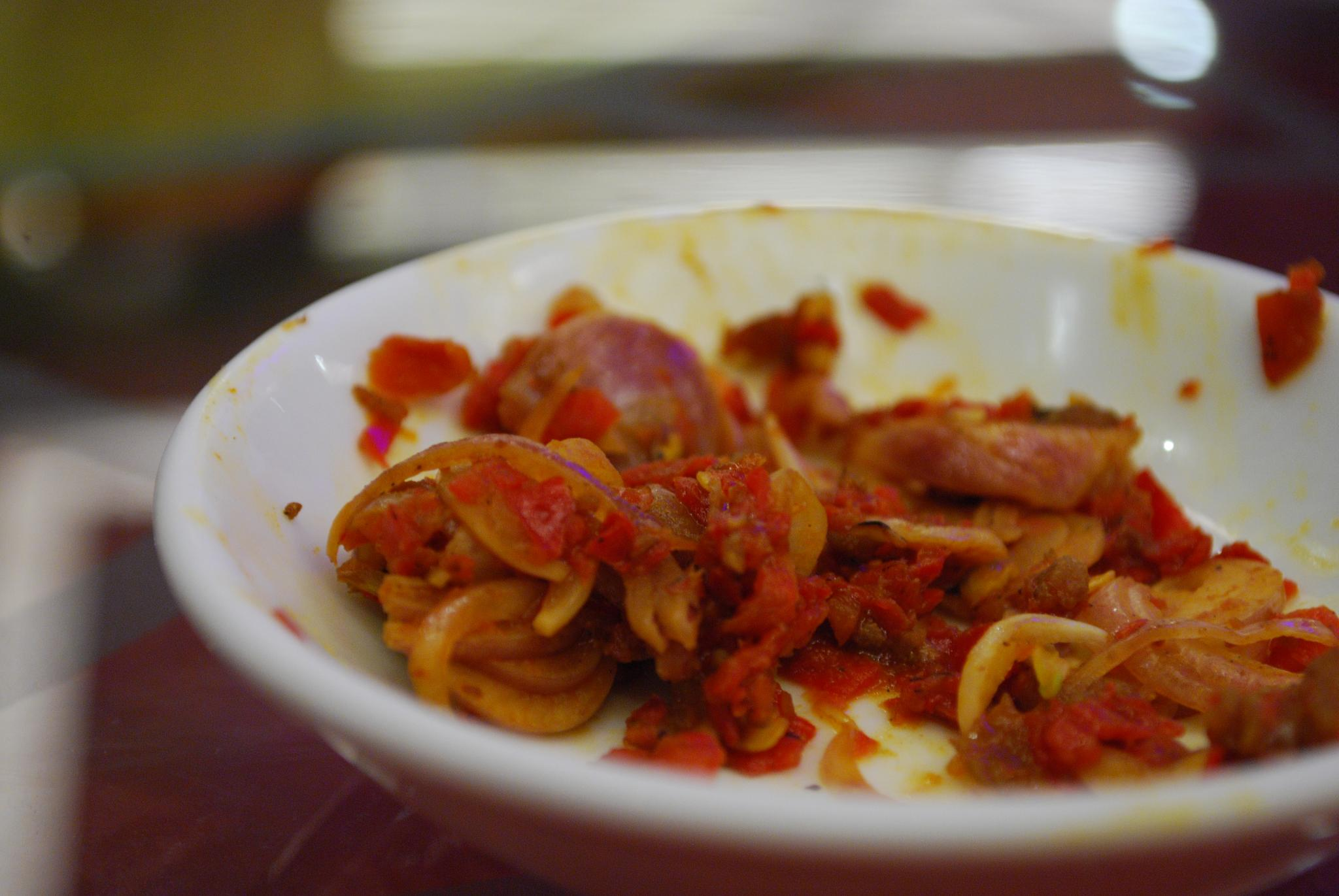
- A bowl of cincalok
- Alternative names: Chinchalok, cencaluk, cencalok
- Type: Condiment
- Course: Appetizer or main course
- Place of origin: Malaysia
- Region or state: Malacca
- Associated cuisine: Brunei, Indonesia, Malaysia and Singapore
- Serving temperature: hot or room temperature
- Main ingredients: Small shrimp or krill

Cincalok (Jawi: چنچالوق), also cencaluk, is a Malay condiment that originated in Malacca, Malaysia, consumed by Malays, Peranakans and Kristangs. Its origins can be traced back to the Portuguese occupation of Malacca. This condiment consists of fermented small shrimp or krill, which are called udang geragau in Melaka and are easily identifiable in the mixture. It is predominantly salty in taste, and is usually served together with chillis, shallots and lime juice. Sir R. O. Winstedt has written about "Cencaluk" in Malaysia in his book "The Circumstances of Malay Life - 1909". This shrimp is seasonally available in Pantai Klebang, Limbongan, Tanjung Kling and several coastal areas.

Presently, cincalok-making enterprises are gaining ground in several areas in the state of Melaka. The state government itself has designated the State Legislative Assembly constituency Sungai Udang as the area to produce cincalok in the 'Satu DUN Satu Produk' plan.

Apart from that, cincalok is also now easily available at roadside stalls and in the markets around the state.

The consumption of cincalok has also spread to Riau and West Kalimantan in Indonesia. It is similar to bagoong alamang (see shrimp paste) in the Philippines and khoei chalu (Thai: เคยฉลู) in Thailand.

== Cincalok manufacturing ==
The process of making cincalok requires several steps. Fresh small prawns (udang geragau) are combined with salt and rice in equal proportions. After the ingredients are thoroughly mixed, they are sealed in a jar and allowed to ferment for three days. There are also cincalok-makers who increase the proportion of rice in the mixture, believing it to enhance the taste of the finished product.

As the finished product is fermented in a sealed glass container, pressure builds up inside the container. Hence, care must be taken when opening a pressurized container of ready-made cincalok.

== See also ==
- List of fish sauces
- List of Indonesian condiments
- Malay cuisine
- Peranakan cuisine
- Saeu-jeot
