= List of Indonesian condiments =

This is a list of Indonesian condiments.

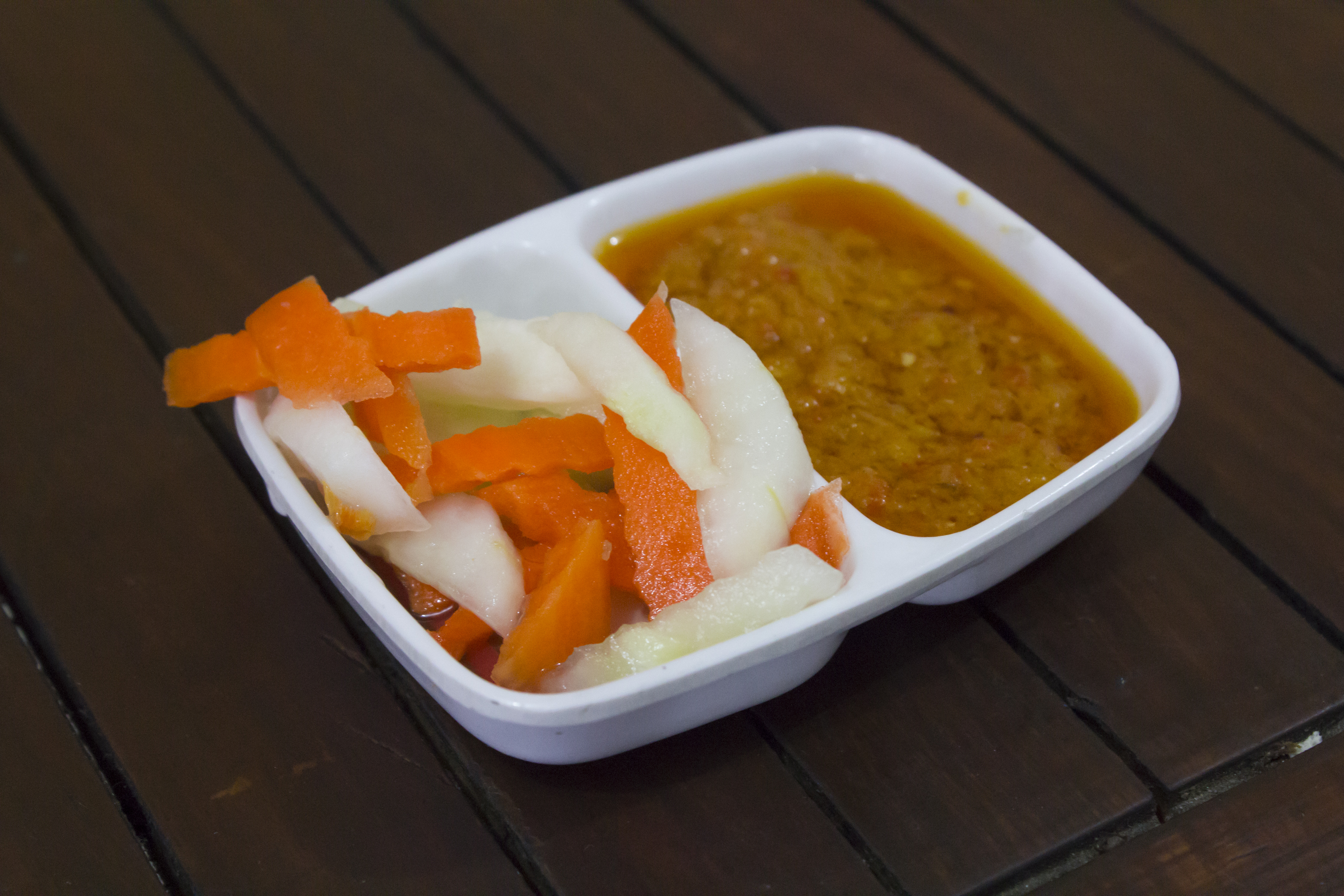
Acar served with sambal, the common condiments in Indonesia.

== Sambals ==
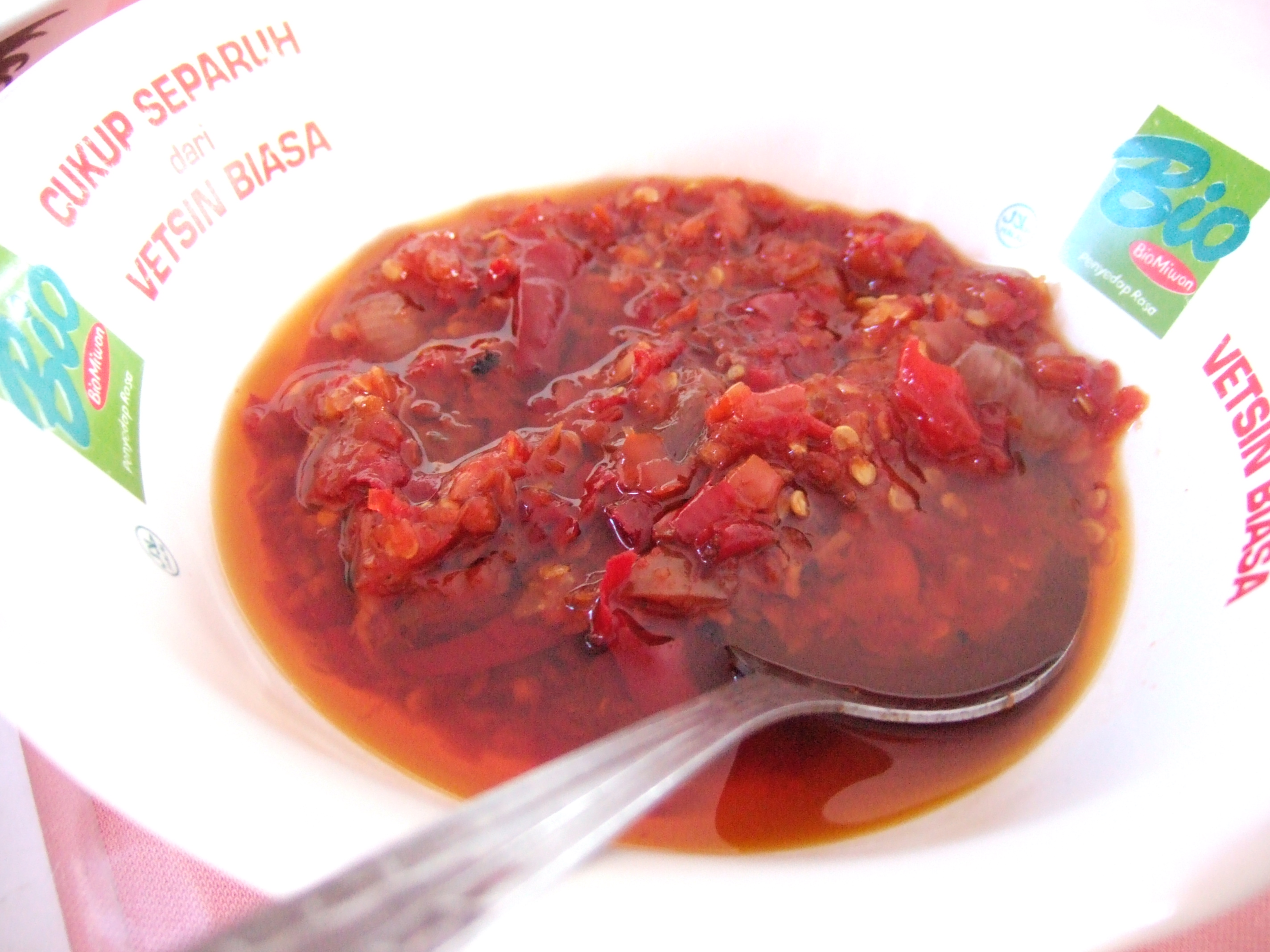
Sambal rica-rica

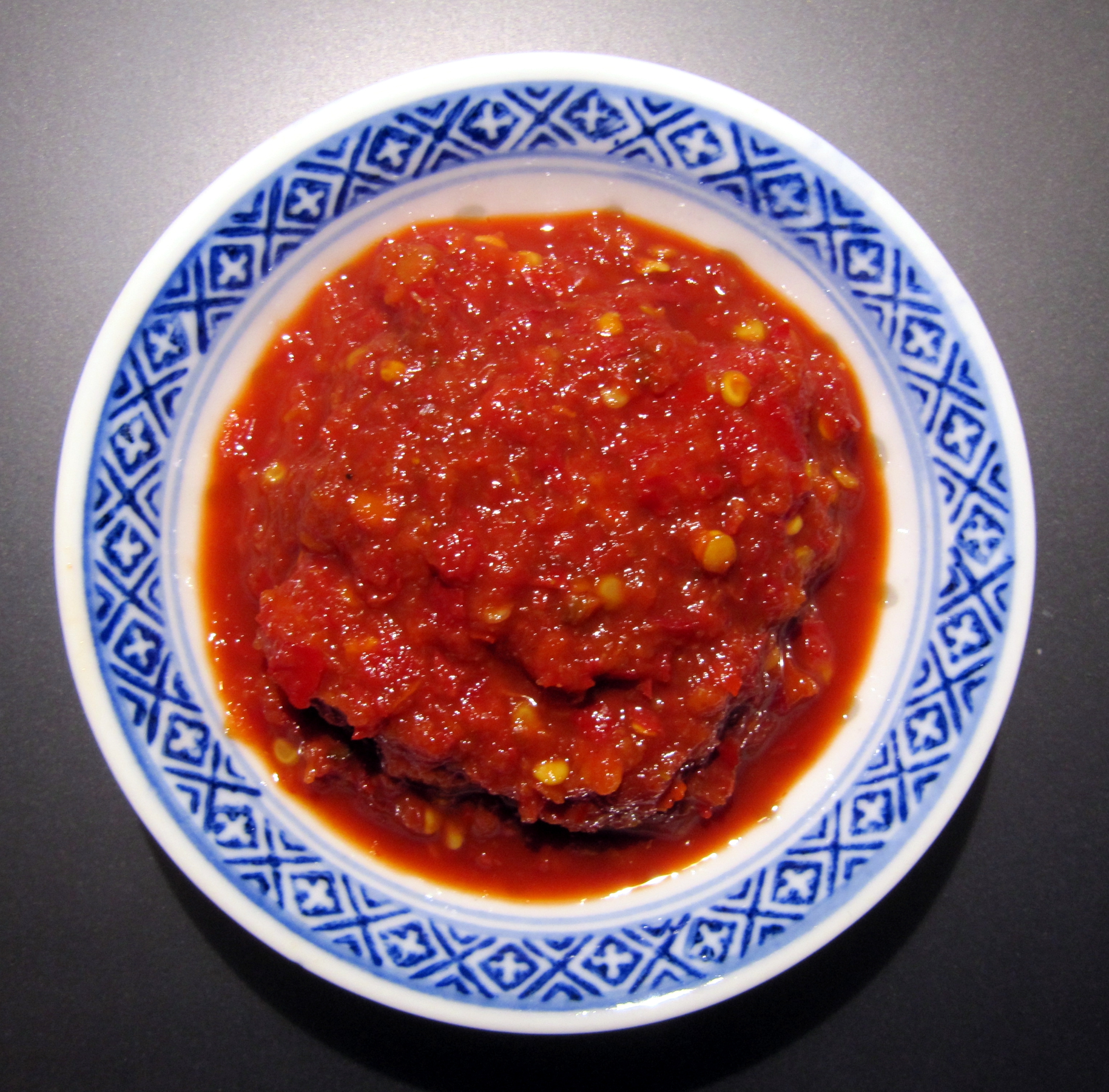
Sambal ulek

- Sambal balado – chili pepper or green chili is blended together with garlic, shallot, red or green tomato, salt and lemon or lime juice, then sauteed with oil. Minang sambal balado often mixed with other ingredients to create a dish, such as egg, eggplant, shrimp or anchovy.
- Sambal colo-colo – sambal from Maluku region. It consists of chili, tomato pieces, shallots, and lime it has a chiefly sour taste. It is suitable for barbecue dishes, especially fish.
- Sambal dabu-dabu – sambal consists of coarsely chopped tomatoes, calamansi or known as lemon cui or jeruk kesturi, shallots, chopped bird's eye chili, red chili, basil, poured with hot vegetable oil, salt.
- Sambal roa - hot sambal that uses chili, tomatoes and spices with smoked Hemiramphus fish from Gorontalo and North Sulawesi. Suitable with rice or fried banana.
- Sambal goreng – sambal that made of a mix of crisp fried red shallots, red and green chili, shrimp paste and salt, briefly stir-fried in coconut oil. It can be made into a whole different dish by adding other ingredients.
- Sambal kacang – sambal of mixture of chili with garlic, shallot, sugar, salt, crushed fried peanuts, and water. Usually used as condiments for nasi uduk, ketan, or otak-otak. The simple version only employ cabe rawit chilli, crushed fried peanuts and water.
- Sambal matah – raw shallot and lemongrass sambal. It contains a lot of finely chopped shallots, chopped bird's eye chili, lemongrass, cooking oil with a dash of lime juice.
- Sambal petai – sambal of mixture of red chili, garlic, shallot, and petai green stinky bean as the main ingredients.
- Sambal petis – sambal that uses chili, shrimp paste, peanuts, young banana, herbs and spices.
- Sambal rica-rica – hot sambal that uses ginger, chili, lemon and spices. Suitable for barbecue meats and chicken.
- Sambal tempoyak – sambal made from fermented durian called tempoyak. The fermentation process takes 3 to 5 days. The chili and the tempoyak may be readily mixed or served separately, to cater the individual preference in ratio of chili to tempoyak to determine the scale of hotness.
- Sambal tuktuk – andaliman (Sichuan pepper) and aso-aso fish (dried and preserved mackerel) sambal from North Sumatra.
- Sambal tumpang – sambal made from the mixture of chili pepper, other spices and semangit (old and pungent) tempeh.
- Sambal ulek – raw chili paste (bright red, thin and sharp tasting).

== Sauces and pastes ==
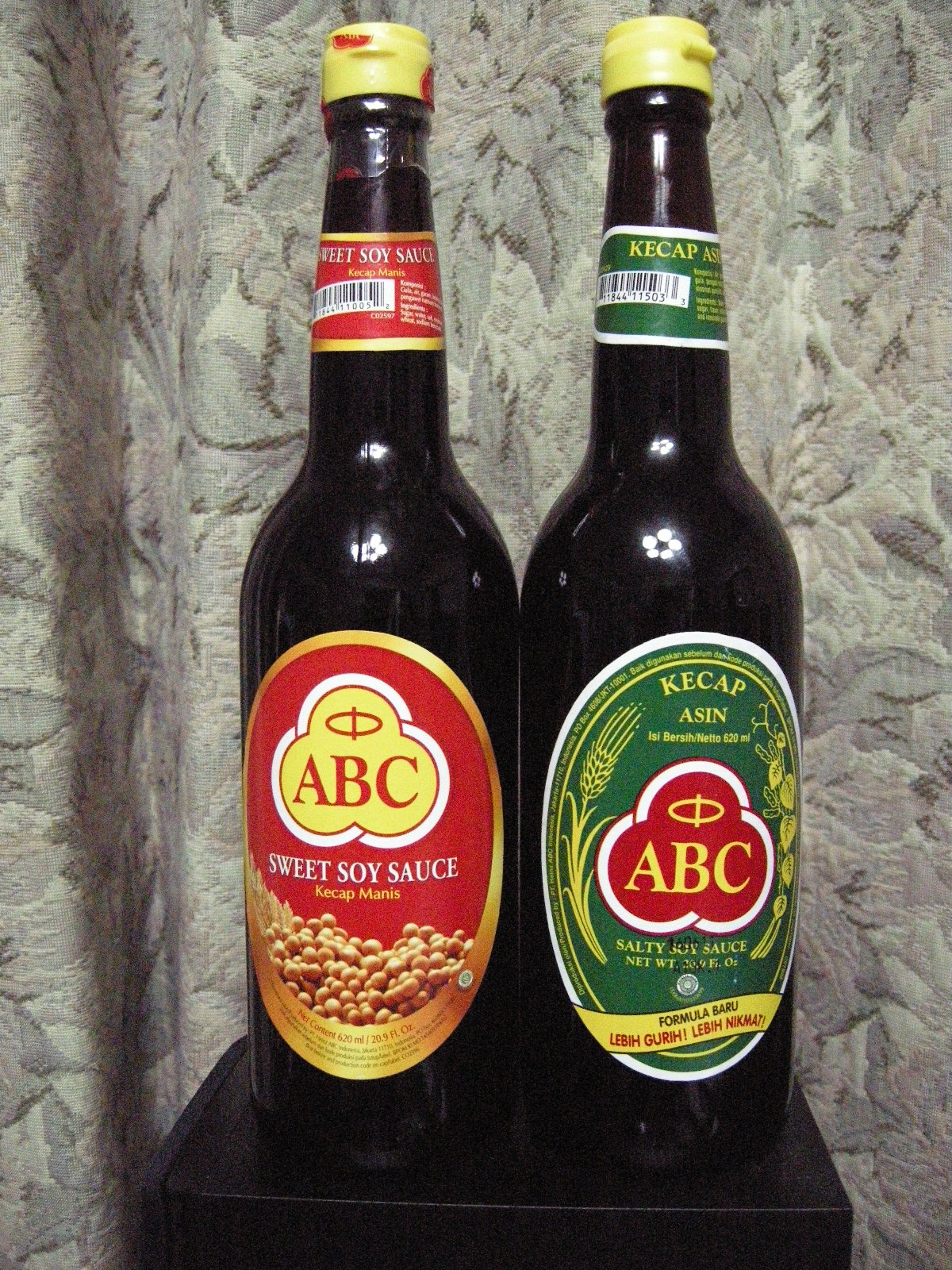
Sweet soy sauce and soy sauce

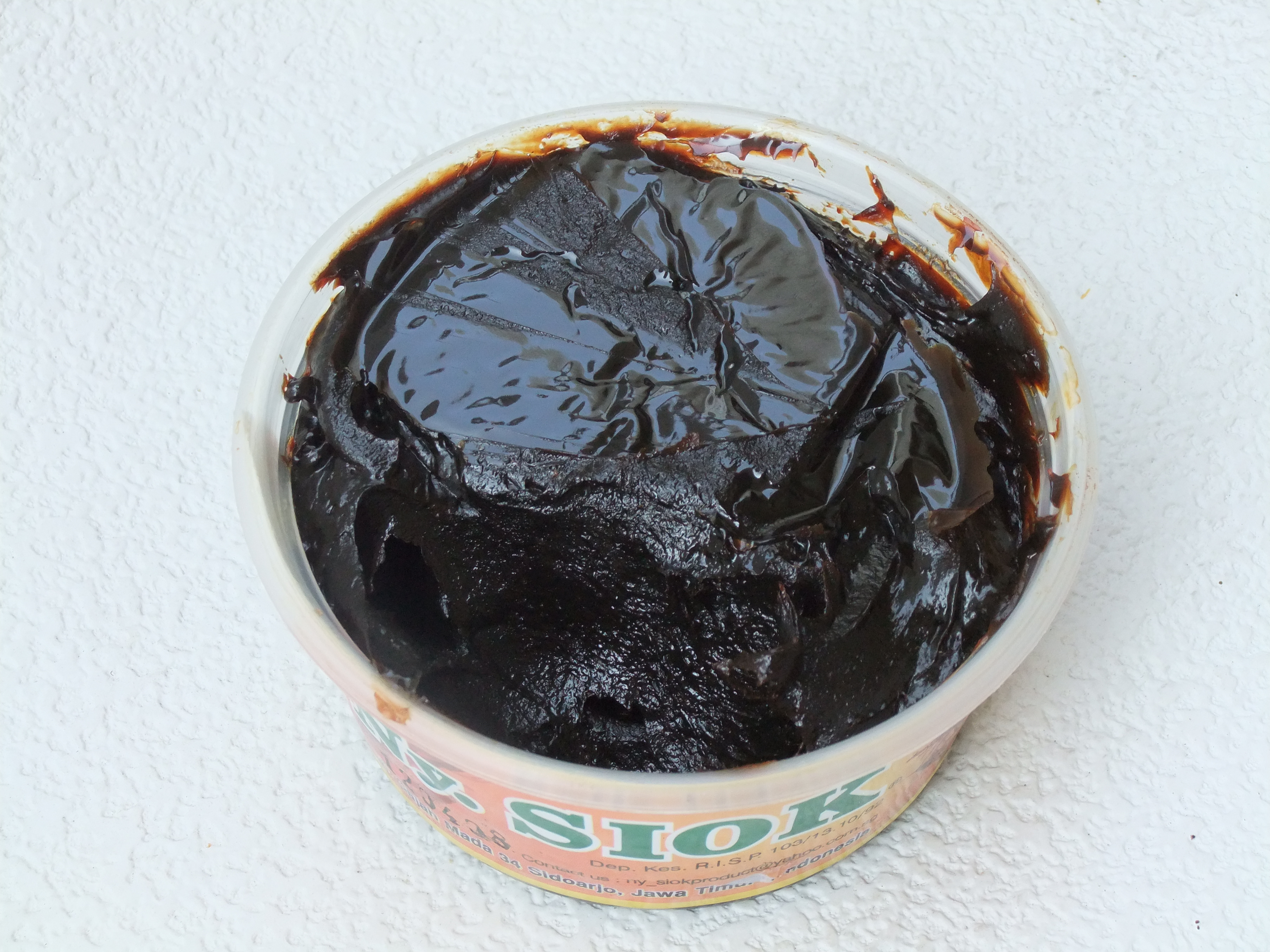
Petis

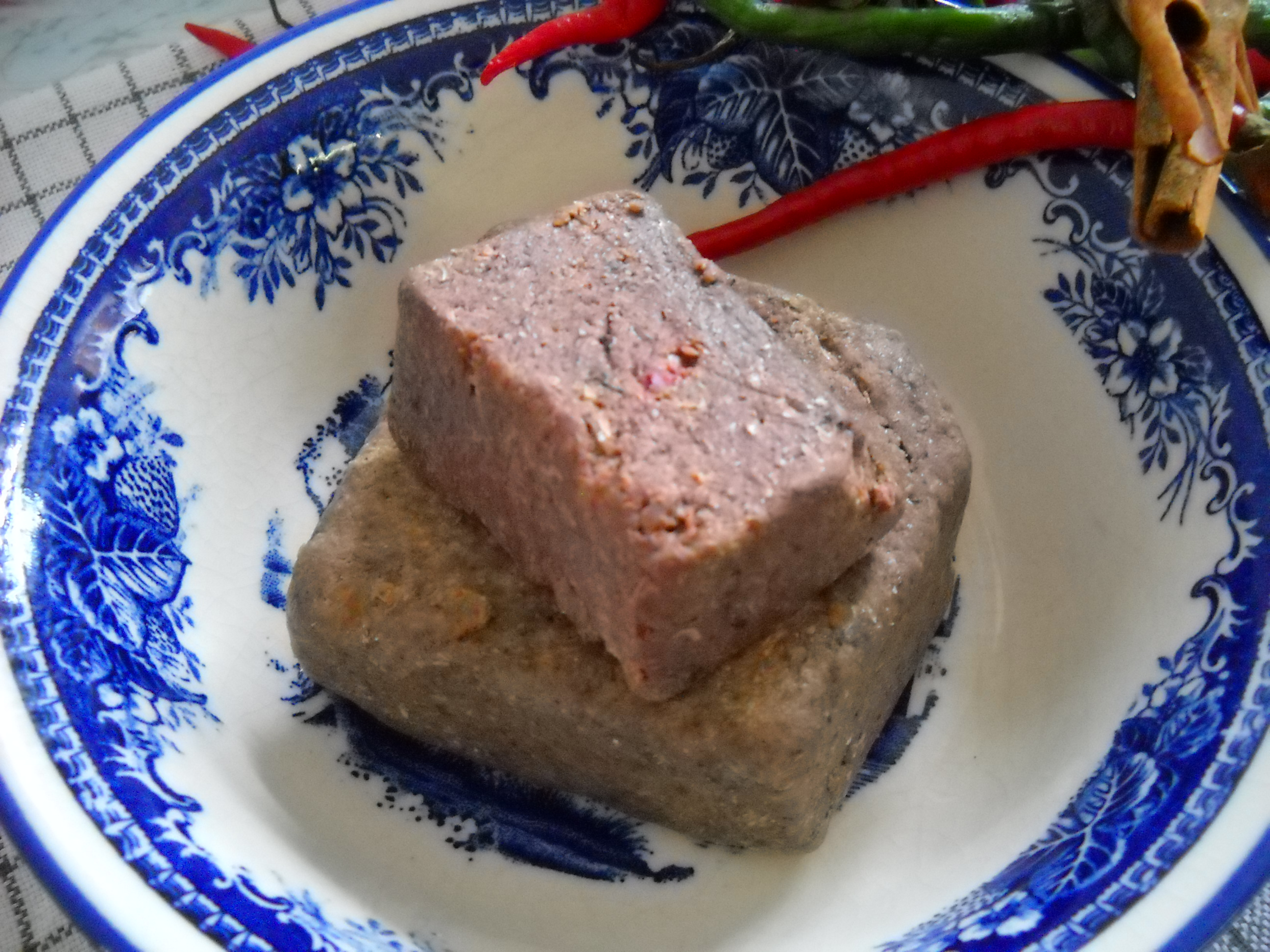
Belacan

- Belacan – shrimp paste, prepared from small shrimp from the Acetes species, known as rebon.
- Cuka (palm vinegar) – vinegar as condiment.
- Kecap asin (soy sauce) – salty soy sauce.
- Kecap manis (sweet soy sauce) – sweetened aromatic soy sauce.
- Kecap manis sedang (medium sweet soy sauce) – medium sweet soy sauce, which has a less thick consistency, is less sweet and has a saltier taste than sweet soy sauce.
- Kecap ikan (fish sauce) – semi-solid condiment made from fish or krill that have been fermented and coated in salt.
- Kecap inggris (Worcestershire sauce) – fermented sauce made of anchovies and spices.
- Lengkare – savoury and sweet shrimp paste, similar to terasi.
- Mayones (mayonnaise) – thick cold condiment or dressing commonly used in sandwiches, salads or fritters, such as selat solo, bistik jawa and gorengan.
- Minyak wijen (sesame oil) – edible vegetable oil derived from sesame seeds.
- Moster (mustard) – paste or sauce made from mustard seeds.
- Pasta asam jawa (tamarind paste) – paste condiment made of tamarind.
- Petis or hae ko – black coloured shrimp paste that popular in Java, commonly used in tofu dishes, rujak, laksa, or popiah.
- Petis ikan (fish paste) – salty dark fish paste.
- Saus kacang (peanut sauce) – sauce made from ground roasted or fried peanuts, commonly used in pecel, nasi pecel, satay, gado-gado or ketoprak.
- Saus tiram (oyster sauce) – oyster sauce with dark coloured.
- Saus tomat (tomato ketchup) – sweet and tangy sauce made from tomatoes, sugar, and vinegar, with seasonings and spices.
- Tauco – paste made from preserved fermented yellow soybeans, commonly used in tahu tauco, swike, kakap tahu tausi or cah kangkung.
- Terasi – dried shrimp paste, usually purchased in dark blocks, but is also sometimes sold ground as granulated coarse powder.
- Tapai – traditional fermented condiment made of rice or other starchy foods, usually used as condiment or topping in sweet dessert, such as es campur and es doger.
- Tempoyak – fermented durian made by taking the flesh of durian and mixing it with some salt and kept in room temperature for three or five days for fermentation.

== Relishes and pickles ==
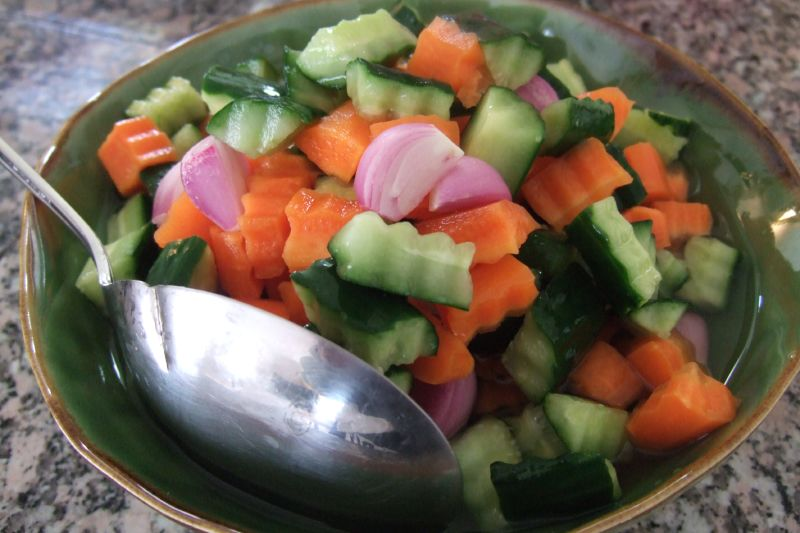
Acar pickle

- Acar – vegetable pickle consists of cucumber, carrots, cabbage, shallot, bird's eye chili, yardlong beans, vinegar, dried chillies, and pineapples.
- Budu – fermented anchovies sauce.
- Cincalok – fermented small shrimps or krill.
- Lalab – slices of fresh vegetables as relish or garnish on the side of main dishes, such as slices of cucumber, tomato, cabbage, lettuce and lemon basil, Usually also include sambal chili paste, such as in the presentation of ayam penyet and pecel lele.
- Nata de coco – jelly-like food condiment produced by the fermentation of coconut water, which gels through the production of microbial cellulose by Komagataeibacter xylinus.
- Tongcai – preserved salted vegetables, commonly used in bakso and mi bakso.
- Urap – steamed vegetables mixed with seasoned and spiced grated coconut.

== Garnishes, sprinkles and toppings ==
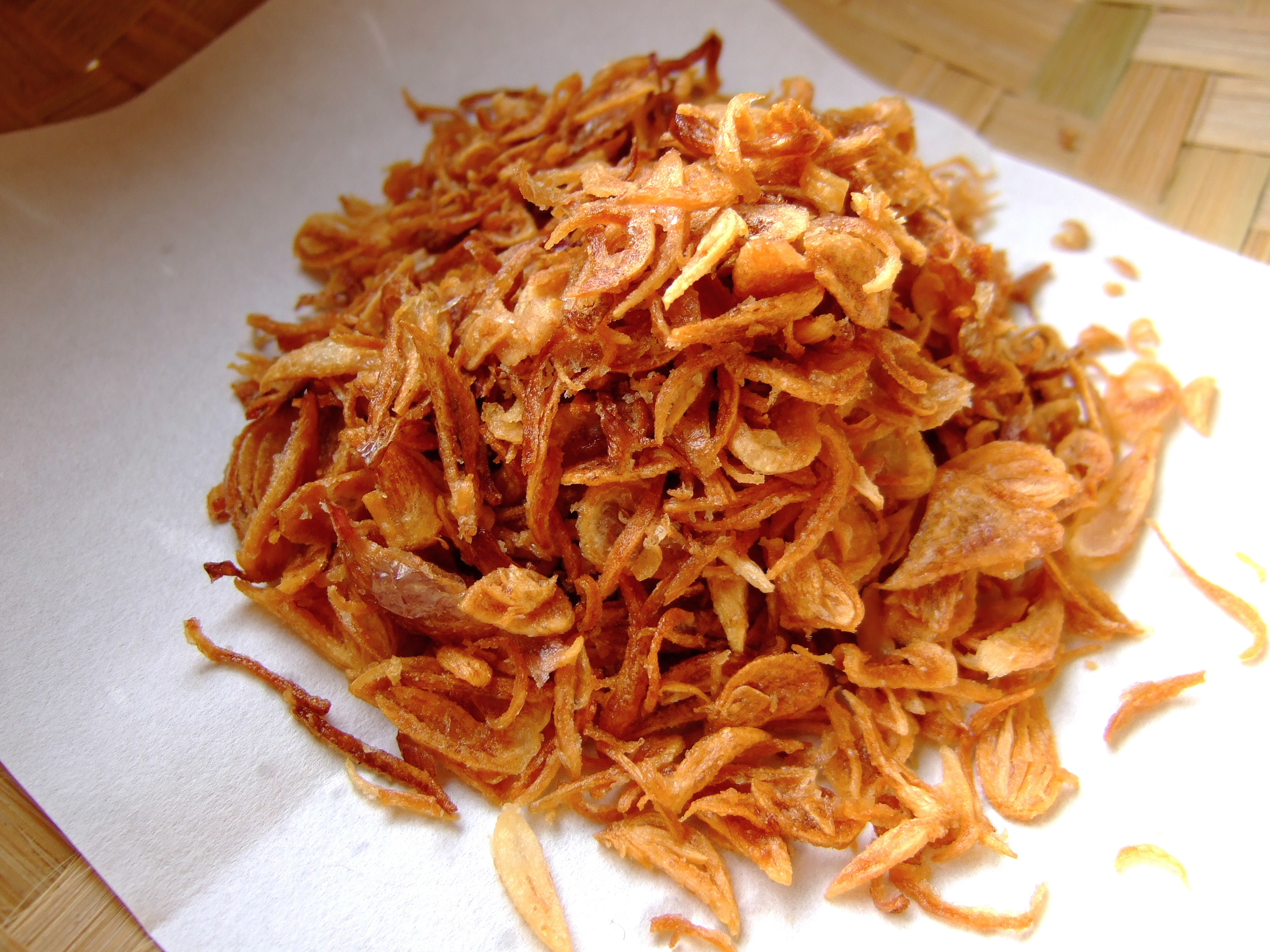
Fried shallots

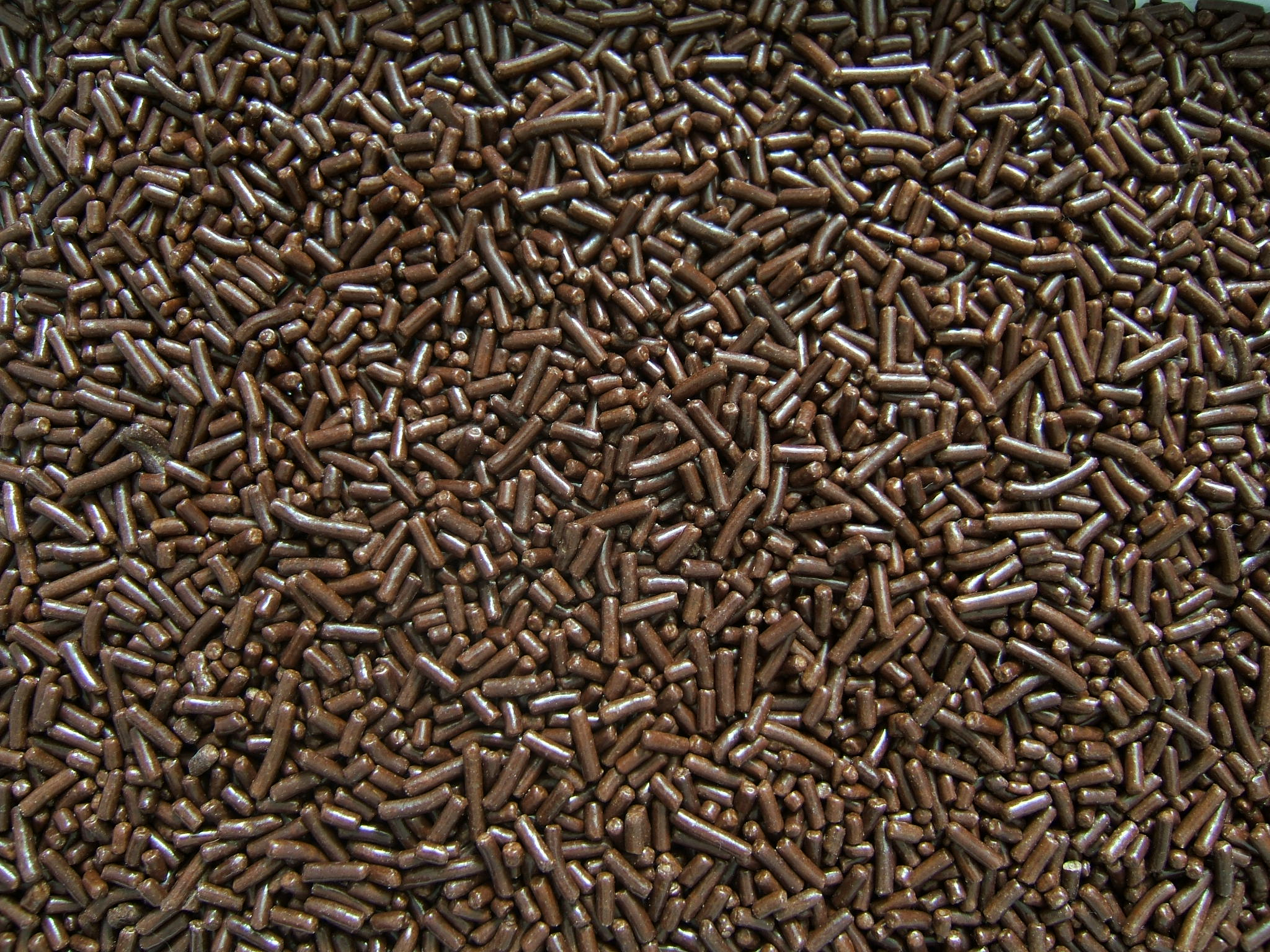
Hagelslag

- Abon (meat floss) – dried meat product with a light and fluffy texture similar to coarse cotton. It can be made from beef, chicken or fish.
- Bawang goreng (fried shallots) – crispy fried onions or shallots sprinkled upon various dishes to give aroma and crispy texture.
- Hagelslag or meses (sprinkles) – very small pieces of confectionery used as a decoration or to add texture to foods such as breads, roti bakar, doughnuts or ice cream.
- Kerisik – sprinkle condiment made from coconut with dark brown colour, commonly used in Malay cuisine, such as rendang and laksa.
- Kismis (raisin) – dried grapes, commonly garnished on nasi kebuli.
- Muisjes – topping condiment that made of aniseeds with a sugared and colored outer layer, commonly used in bread as topping.
- Seledri (celery) – celery leaf used as garnish and sprinkled upon food, such as upon bubur ayam chicken rice porridge.
- Serundeng – grated coconut sauteed and spiced, can be served with beef, sprinkled on soto, or eaten with sticky rice.
- Vlokken – chocolate flakes, commonly used as sandwich topping.

== Krupuk and kripik ==
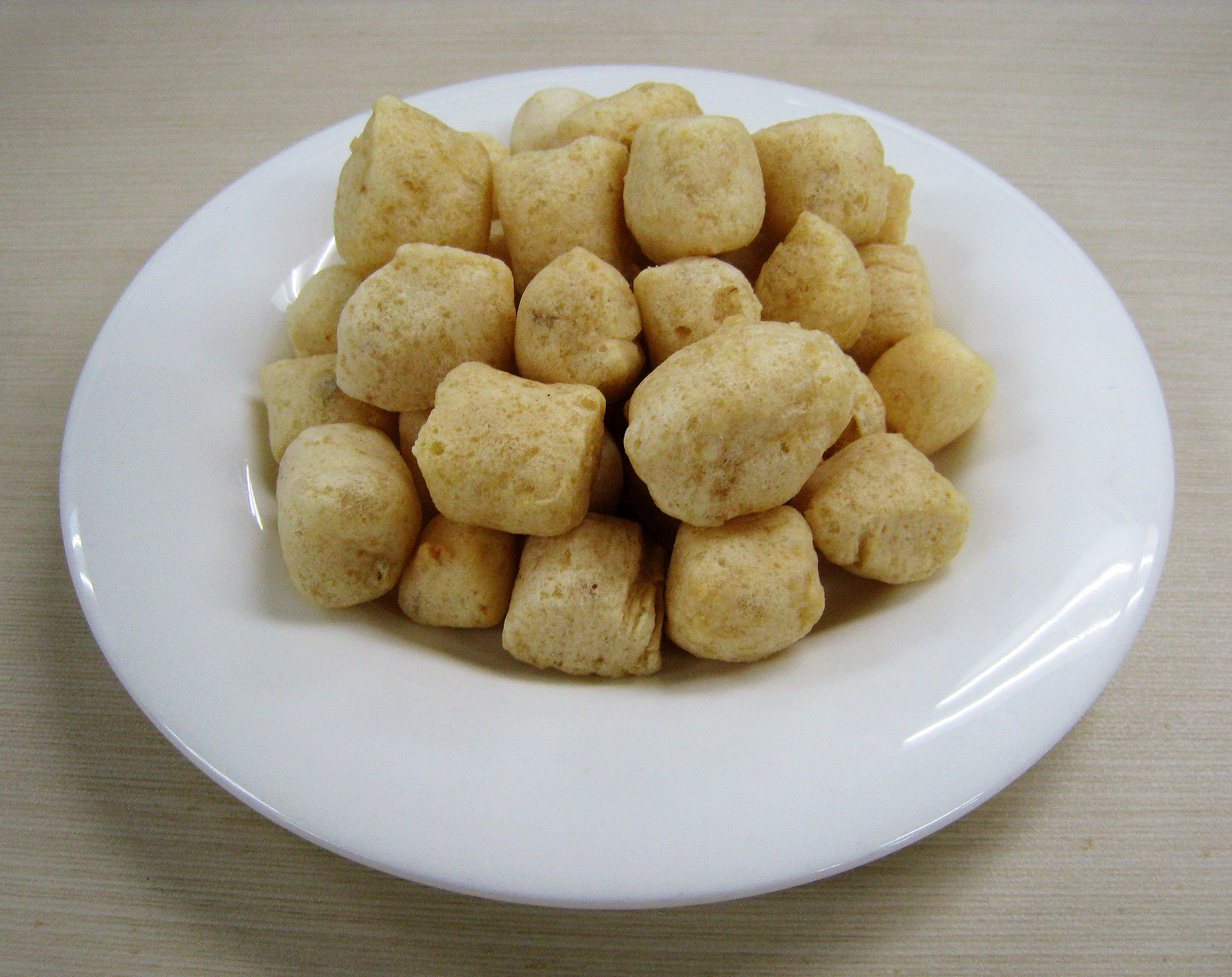
Amplang crackers

- Amplang – savoury fish cracker snack, made from wahoo or any type of Spanish mackerel.
- Emping – crackers made from flattened Gnetum gnemon seeds.
- Kemplang – savoury fish cracker snack, made from wahoo or any type of Spanish mackerel, similar to amplang cracker.
- Keripik – chips or crisps, bite-size snack crackers that can be savoury or sweet.
- Kerupuk – deep fried crackers made from starch and other ingredients.
  - Kerupuk ikan – krupuk snack made from starch and fish.
  - Kerupuk kulit – cow, buffalo or pork skin crackers.
  - Kerupuk udang – krupuk snack made from starch and prawn.
- Rempeyek – cracker snack made from flour with other ingredients, bound or coated by crispy flour batter.
- Rengginang – rice cracker, made from cooked glutinous sticky rice and seasoned with spices.

== Spreads ==
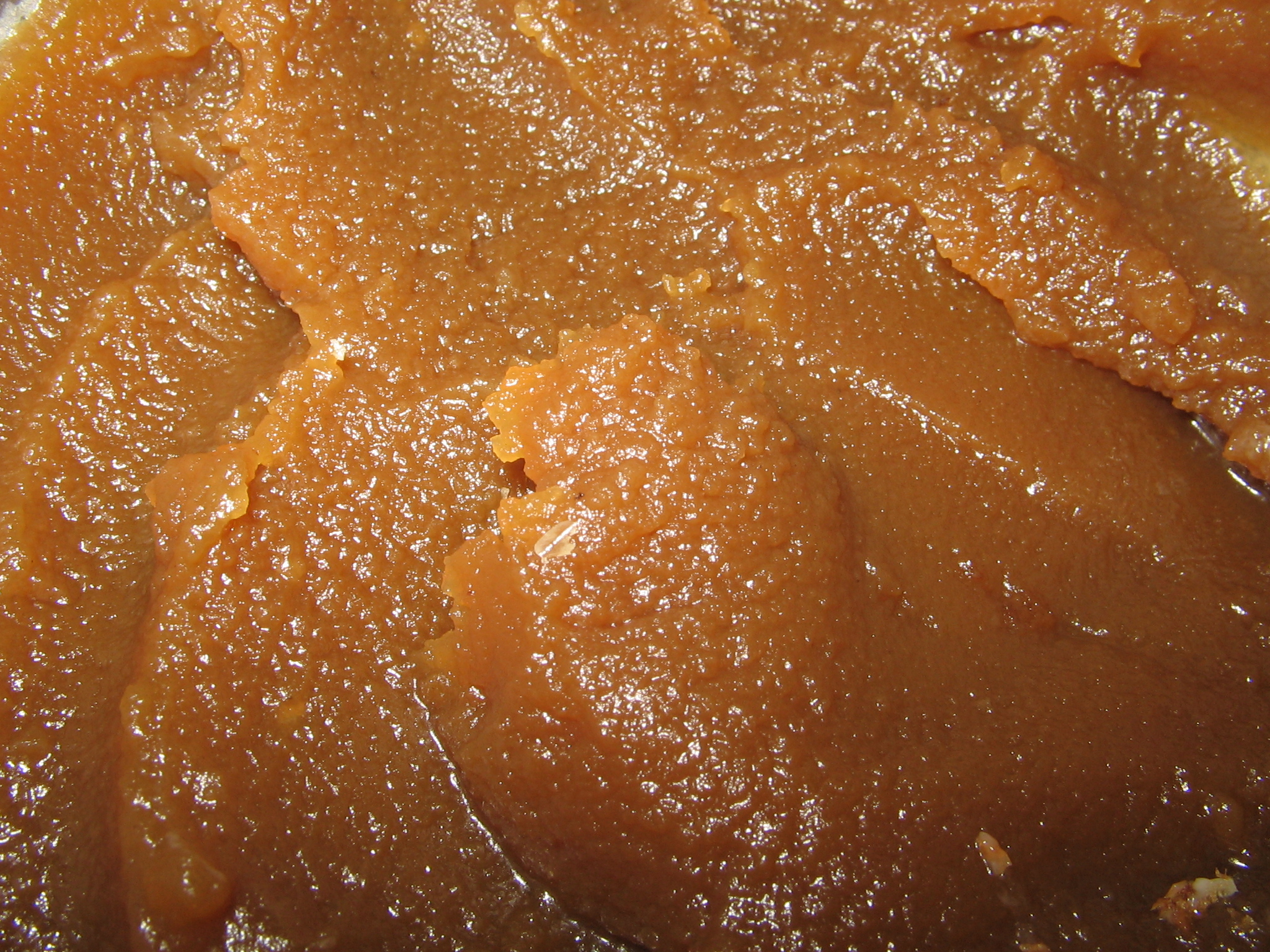
Coconut jam

- Selai kacang (peanut butter) – spread made from ground and dry-roasted peanuts.
- Selai serikaya (coconut jam) – sweet creamy coconut spread made from coconut milk, duck or chicken eggs, sugar and pandan leaf.

== Gallery ==
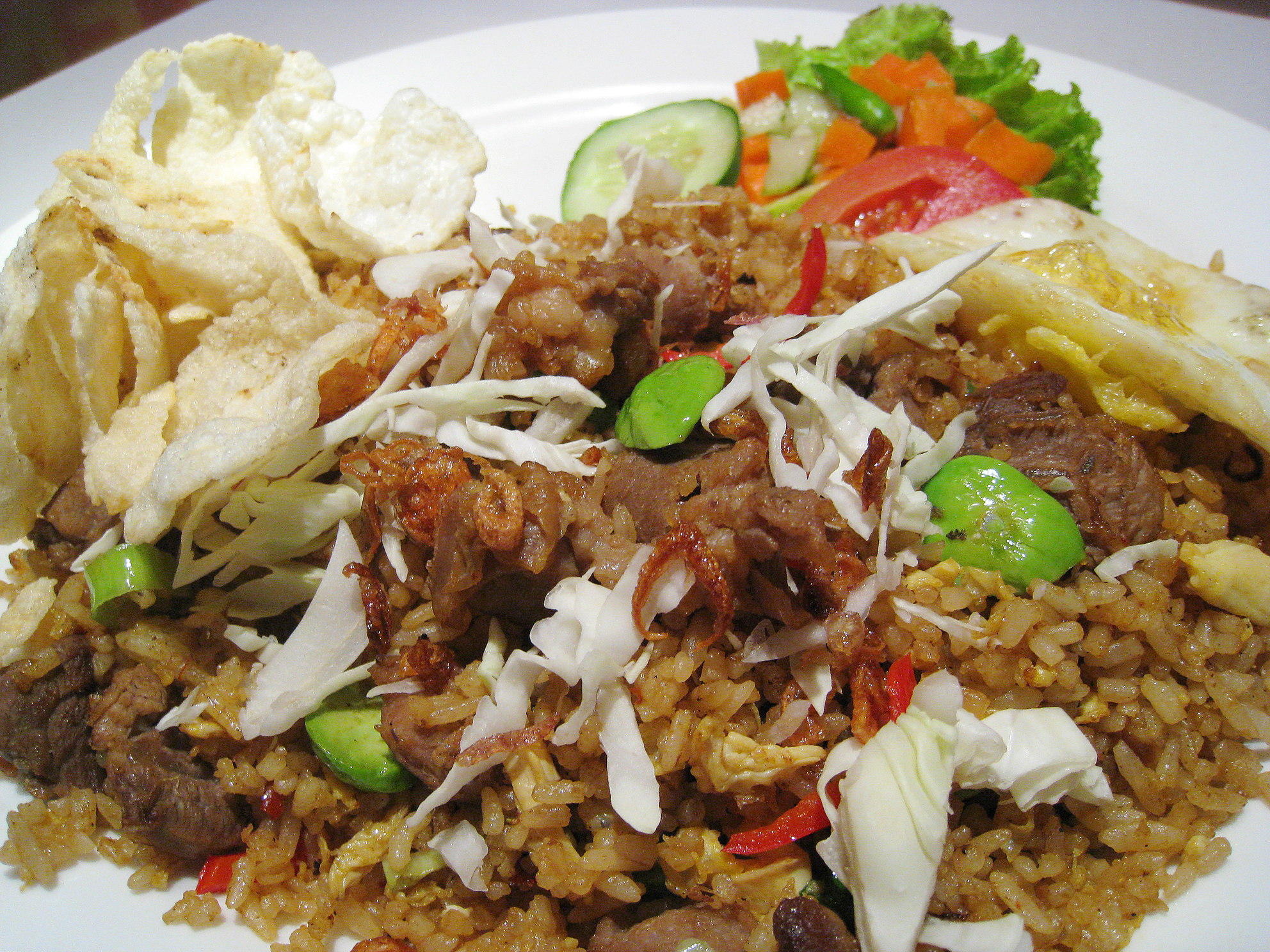
Nasi goreng with various condiments includes; emping cracker, fried shallots, acar pickles and lalab.

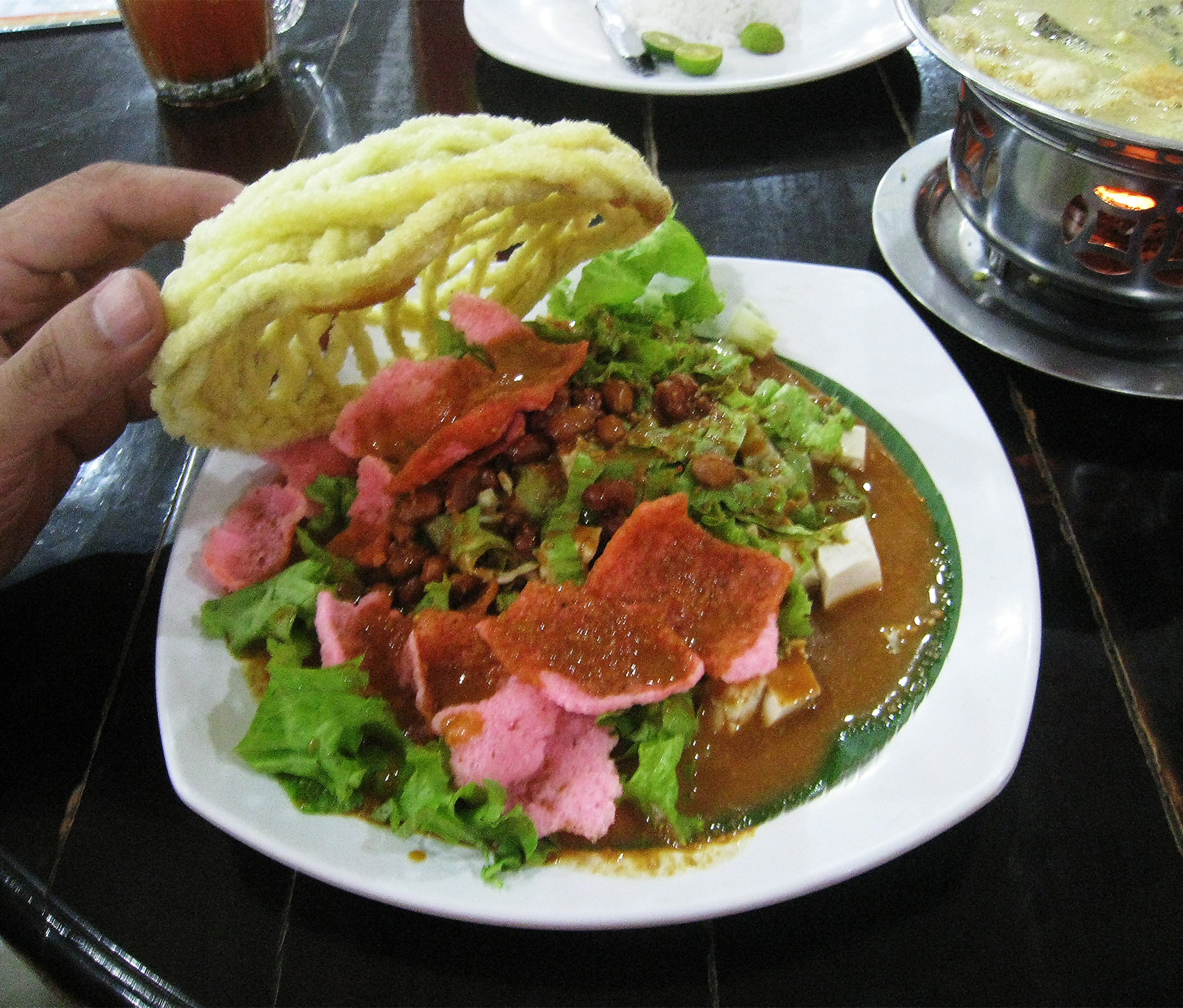
Asinan betawi with krupuk as condiment.

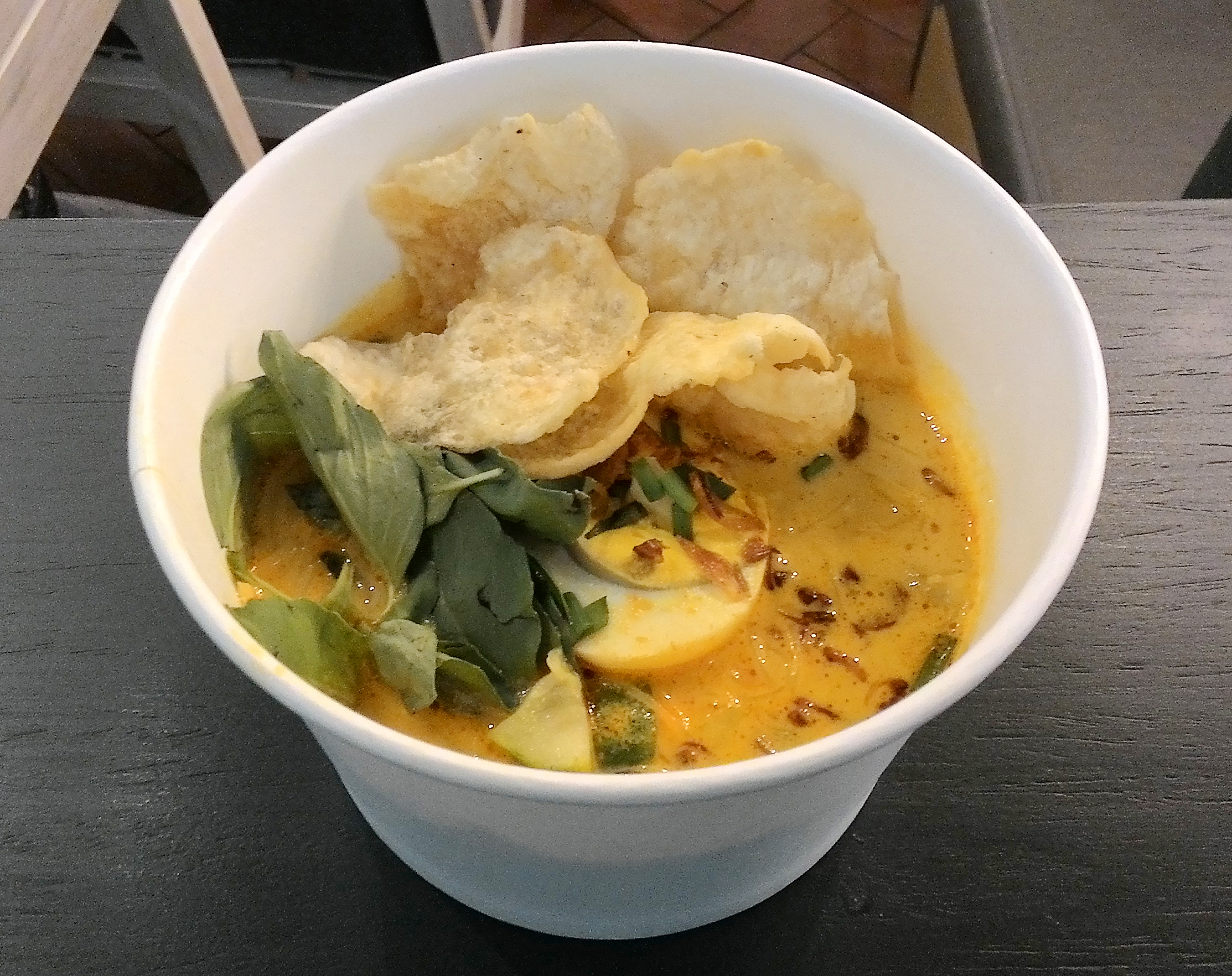
Emping, lemon basil and bawang goreng on top of laksa betawi as garnishing.

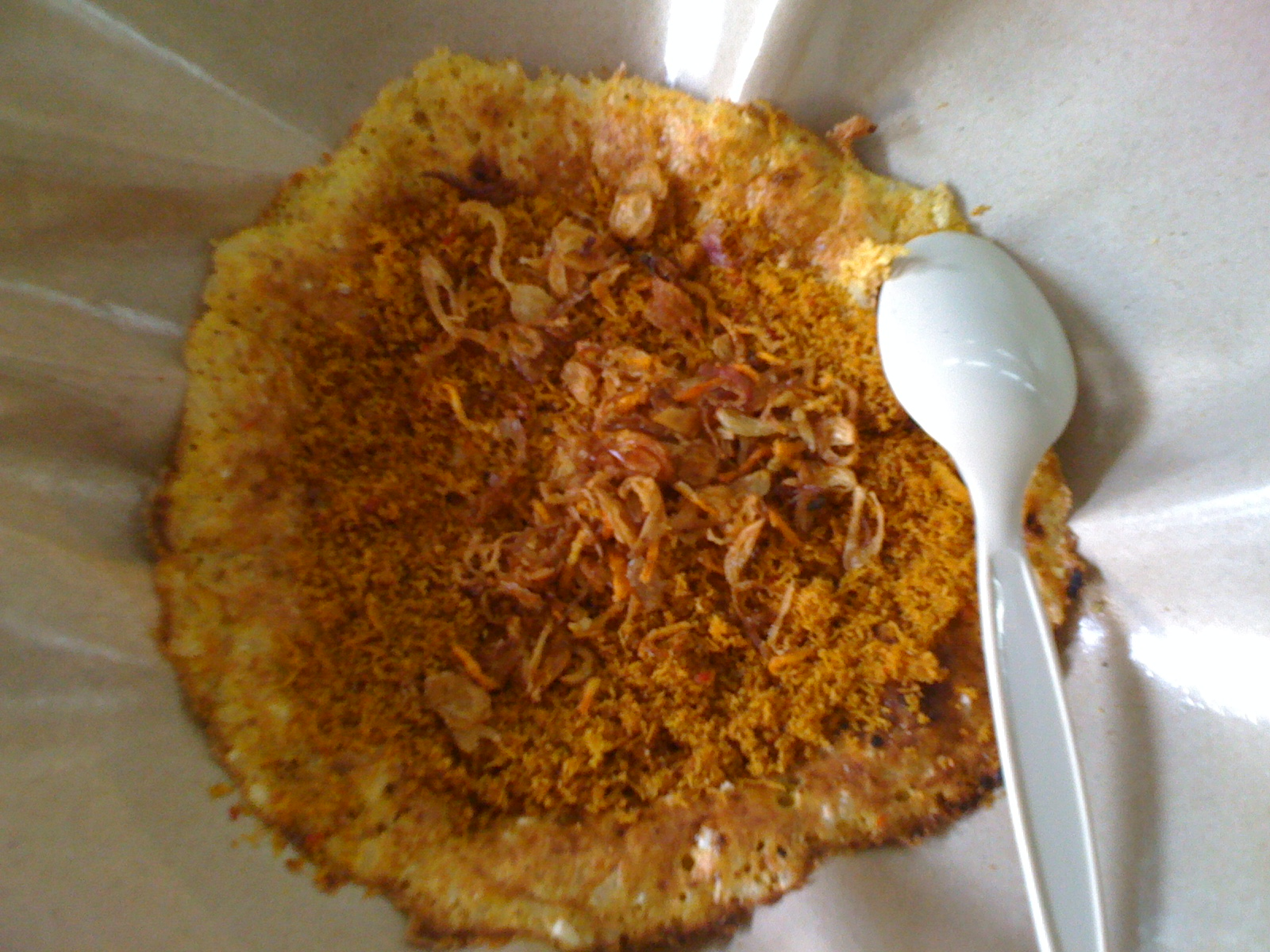
Kerak telor with fried shallots on top.

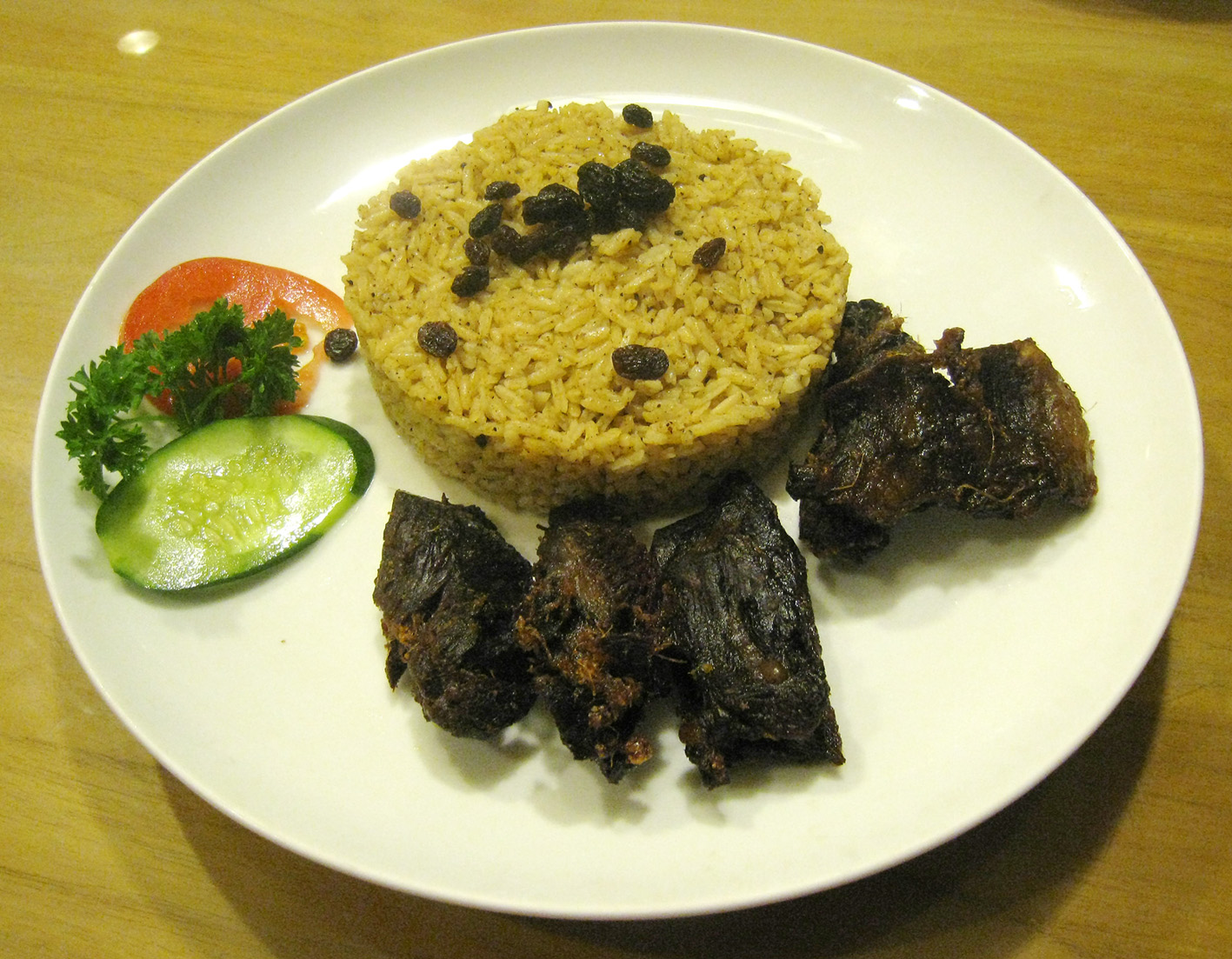
Goat nasi kebuli with raisins as garnishing.

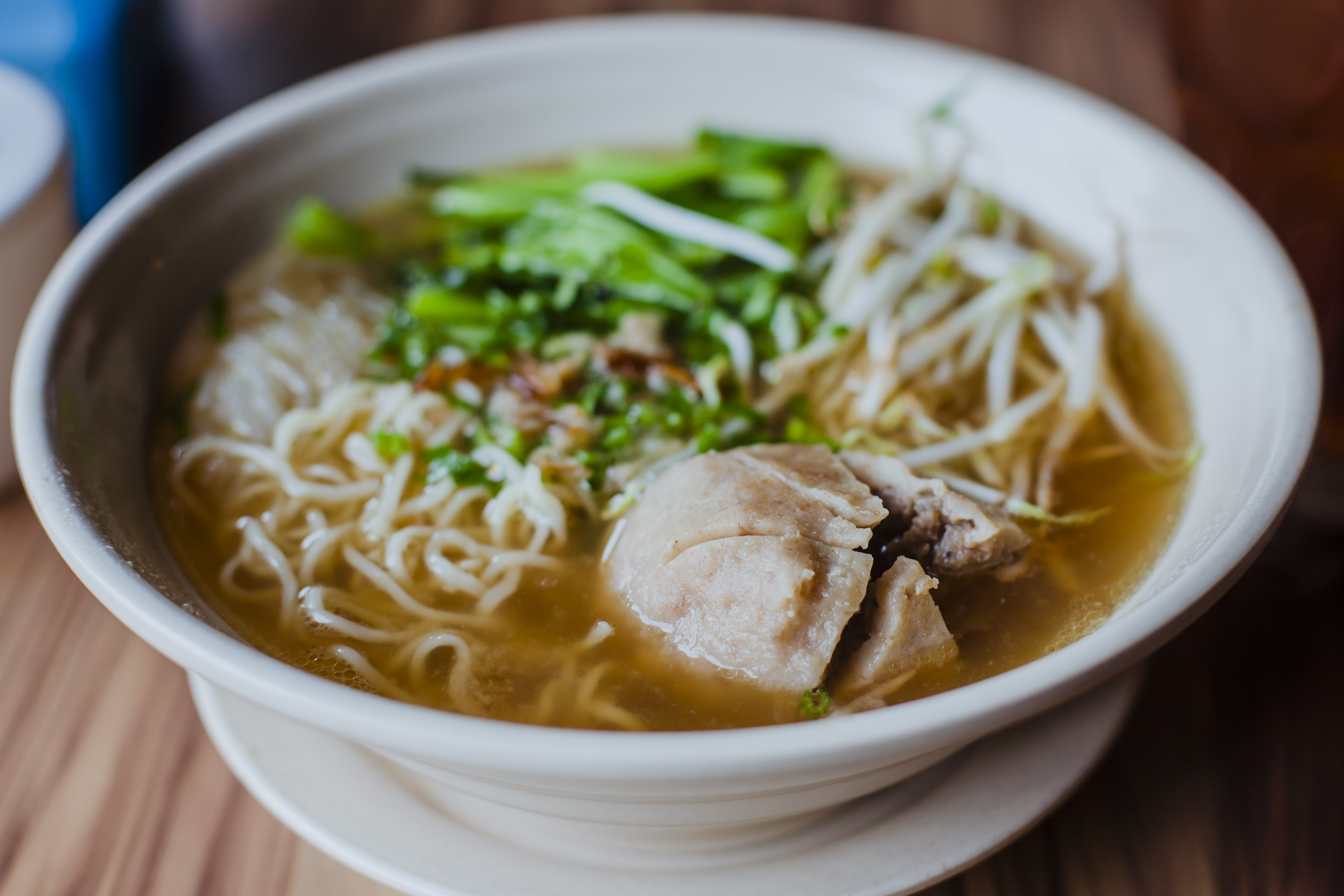
Mi bakso with tongcai and fried shallots.

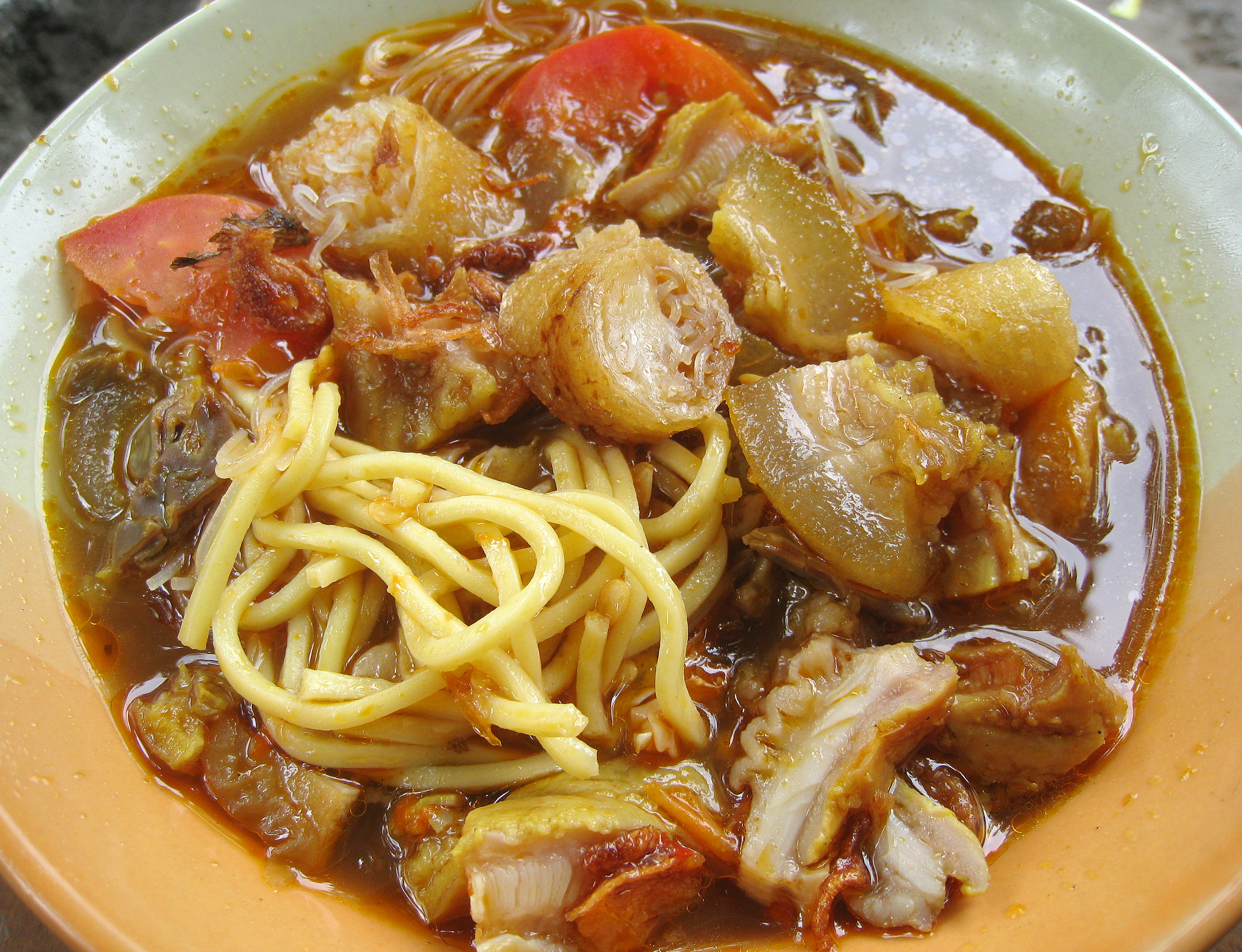
Soto mi sprinkled with fried shallots and sambal.

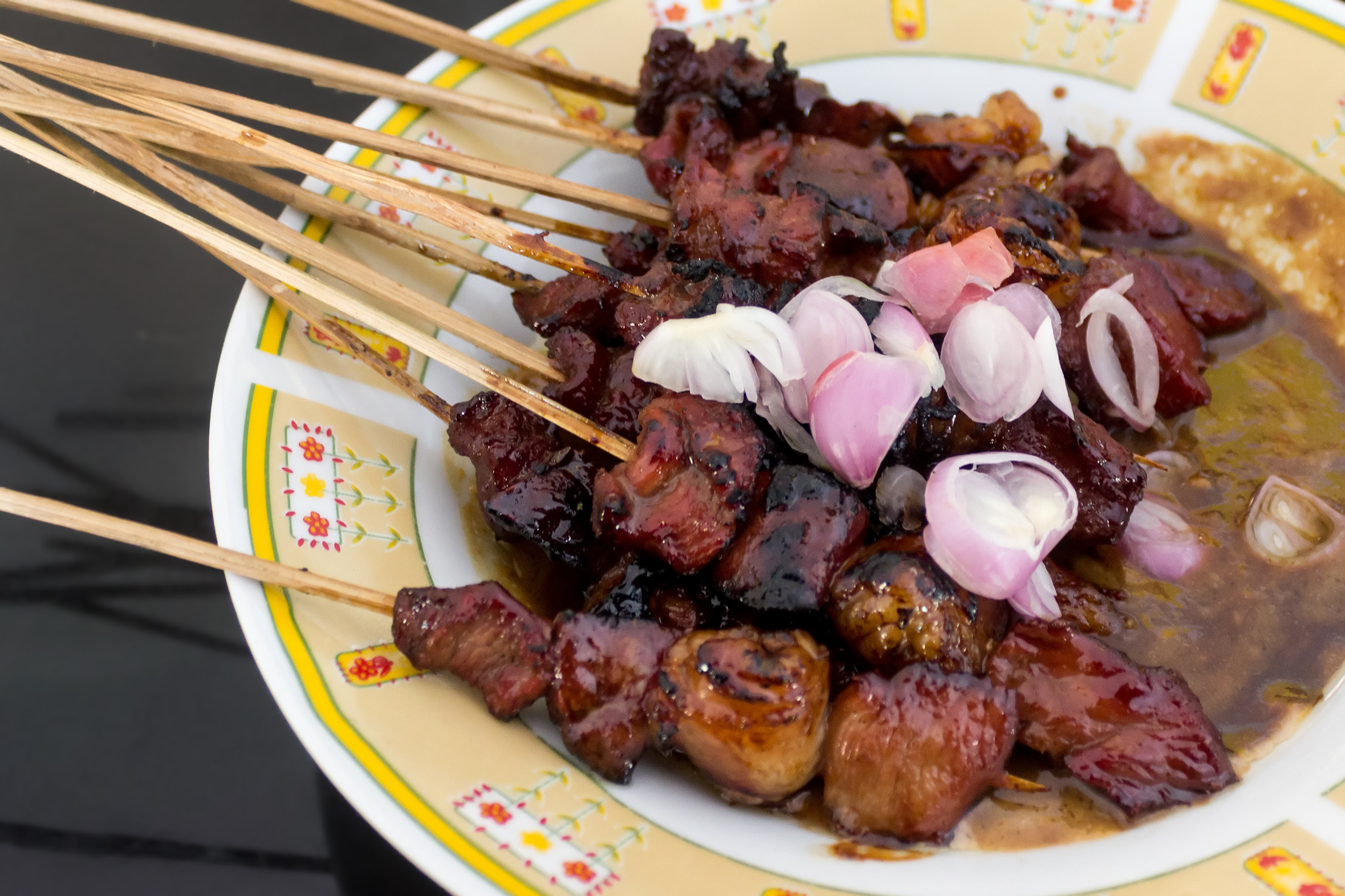
Mutton satay in peanut sauce.

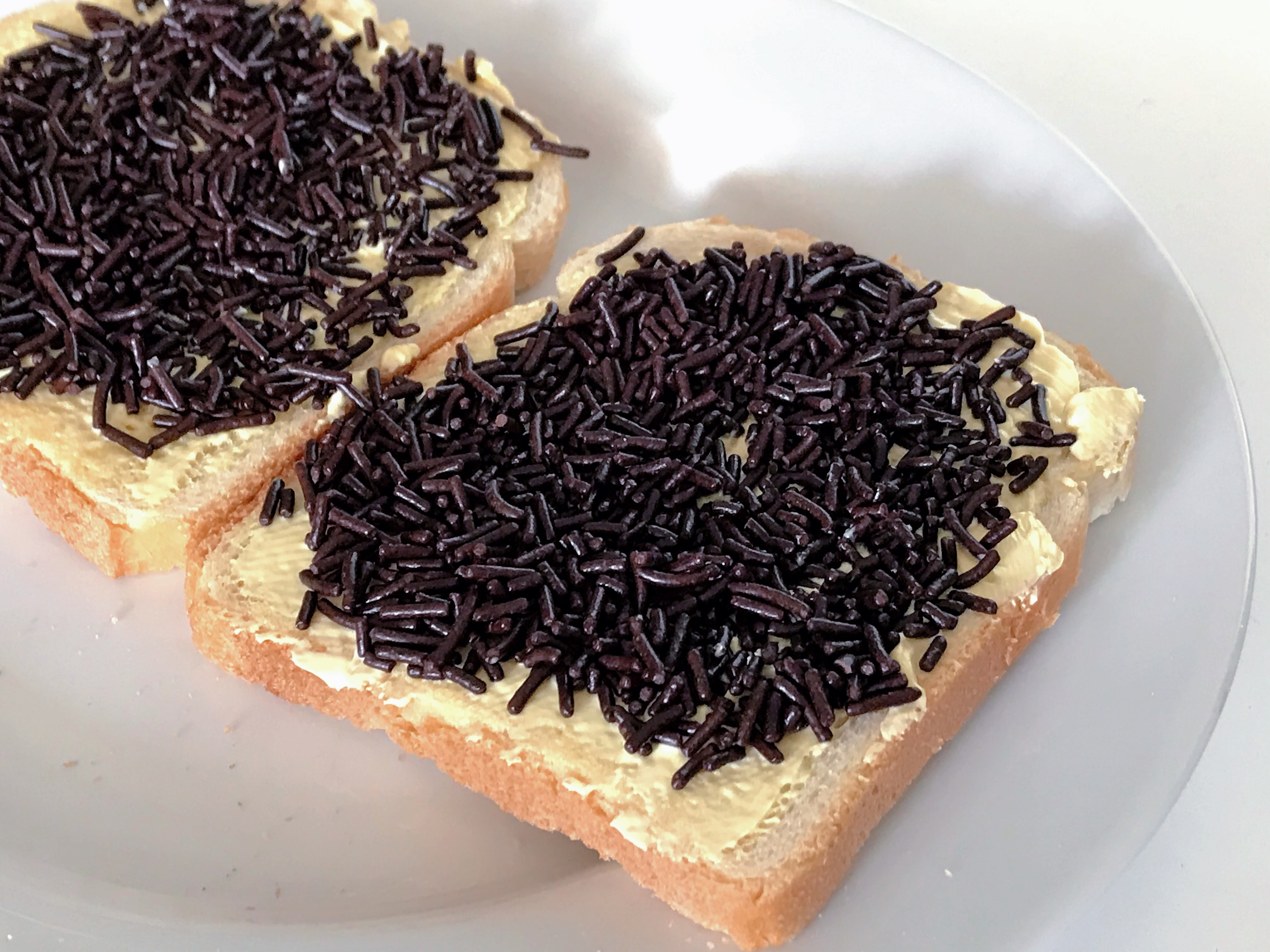
Hagelslag sprinkled on top of sandwiches.

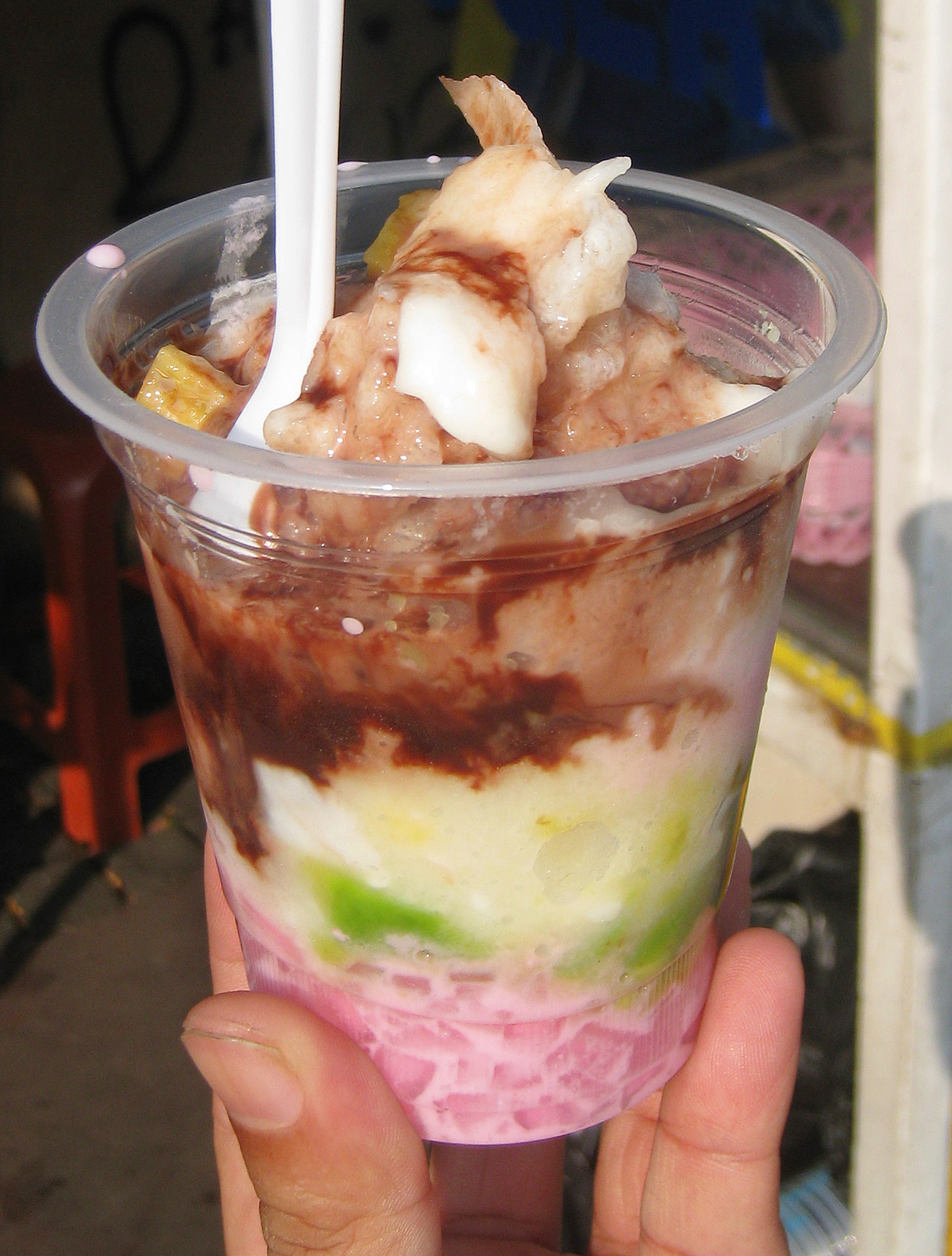
Es doger with cassava tapai.

== See also ==
- Indonesian cuisine
- Bumbu (seasoning)
- Condiment
- Cuisine of Indonesia
- Kripik
- Krupuk
- List of condiments
- List of Indonesian dishes
- South Asian pickle
- Sambal
- Sauce
