= Winsted =

Winsted may refer to a location in the United States:

- Winsted, Connecticut
- Winsted (Aberdeen, Maryland), a home on the National Register of Historic Places
- Winsted, Minnesota

== See also ==
- Winstead (disambiguation)
- Winstedt, a surname
