= Eric Otto Winstedt =

British latinist and gypsiologist (1880–1955)

Eric Otto Winstedt (1880, Oxford – January 29, 1955), or more commonly E. O. Winstedt, was a British Latinist and gypsiologist. He translated Latin works to English, e. g. Marcus Tullius Cicero's letters to Atticus and compiled a 'register of Gypsy names' in the 1920s. Early in his career he published several articles on Coptic texts as well as a book with text editions. His brother was Sir Richard Olaf Winstedt.
