= Winstead House =

Winstead House may refer to:

in the United States

(by state then city)

- Merritt-Winstead House, Roxboro, North Carolina, listed on the NRHP in Person County
- John M. Winstead Houses, Brentwood, Tennessee, NRHP-listed, in Williamson County
- Winstead House (Franklin, Tennessee), listed on the NRHP in Williamson County
- Winstead Hill, a historic house in Franklin, Tennessee, listed on the NRHP in Williamson County
- Winstead Mansion, in Knoxville, Tennessee, a house located within Bethel Confederate Cemetery near the Mabry-Hazen House
