= Winstead (surname) =

Winstead is an American surname. Notable people with the surname include:

- Charles Winstead (1891–1973), one of the three FBI agents who shot and killed John Dillinger
- Isaiah Winstead (born 1999), American football player
- Lizz Winstead (born 1961), American comedian, radio and television personality, and blogger
- Mary Elizabeth Winstead (born 1984), American actress
- Nash Winstead (1925–2008), North Carolina State University assistant professor and administrator in various positions
- W. Arthur Winstead (1904–1995), U.S. Representative from Mississippi
- Wendy Winstead (?–1990), American veterinarian and author
- Doodles Weaver (1911–1983), born Winstead Sheffield Weaver, American actor and comedian
