= Bawang goreng =

Indonesian crispy fried shallot

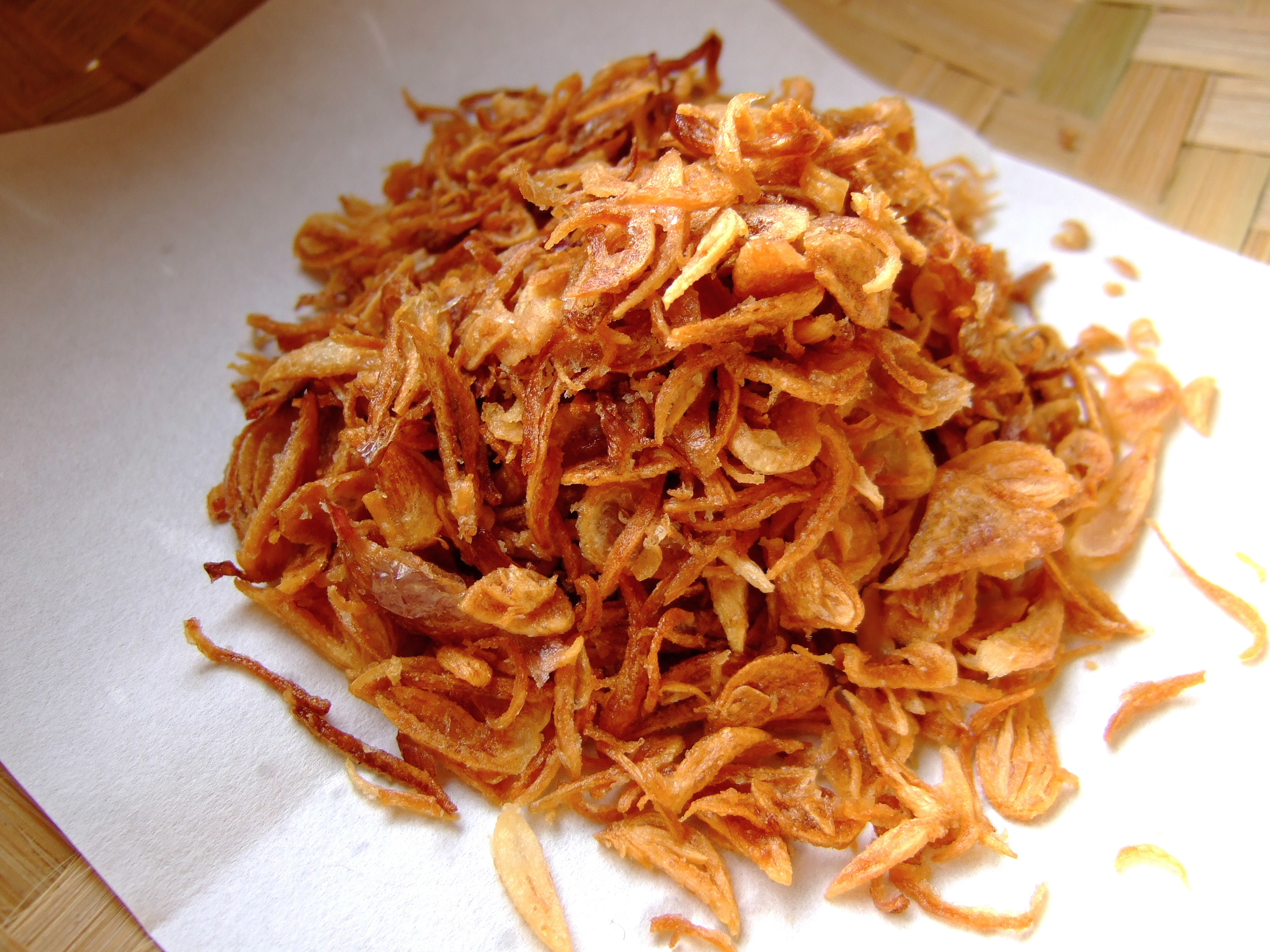
- Indonesian crispy bawang goreng or fried shallot
- Type: fried onion
- Place of origin: Indonesia
- Main ingredients: shallots

Bawang goreng is an Indonesian crispy fried shallot condiment, commonly deep-fried, and a popular garnish to be sprinkled upon various dishes of Indonesian cuisine. It is quite similar to a crisp fried onion.

== Ingredients ==
Compared to onions, shallots are much smaller in size and more intense in color — purplish red, locally known as bawang merah (lit. "red onion") in Indonesia. Shallots are thinly sliced and deep fried in plenty of cooking oil until golden crisp. They are often placed in a tight glass jar for next use.

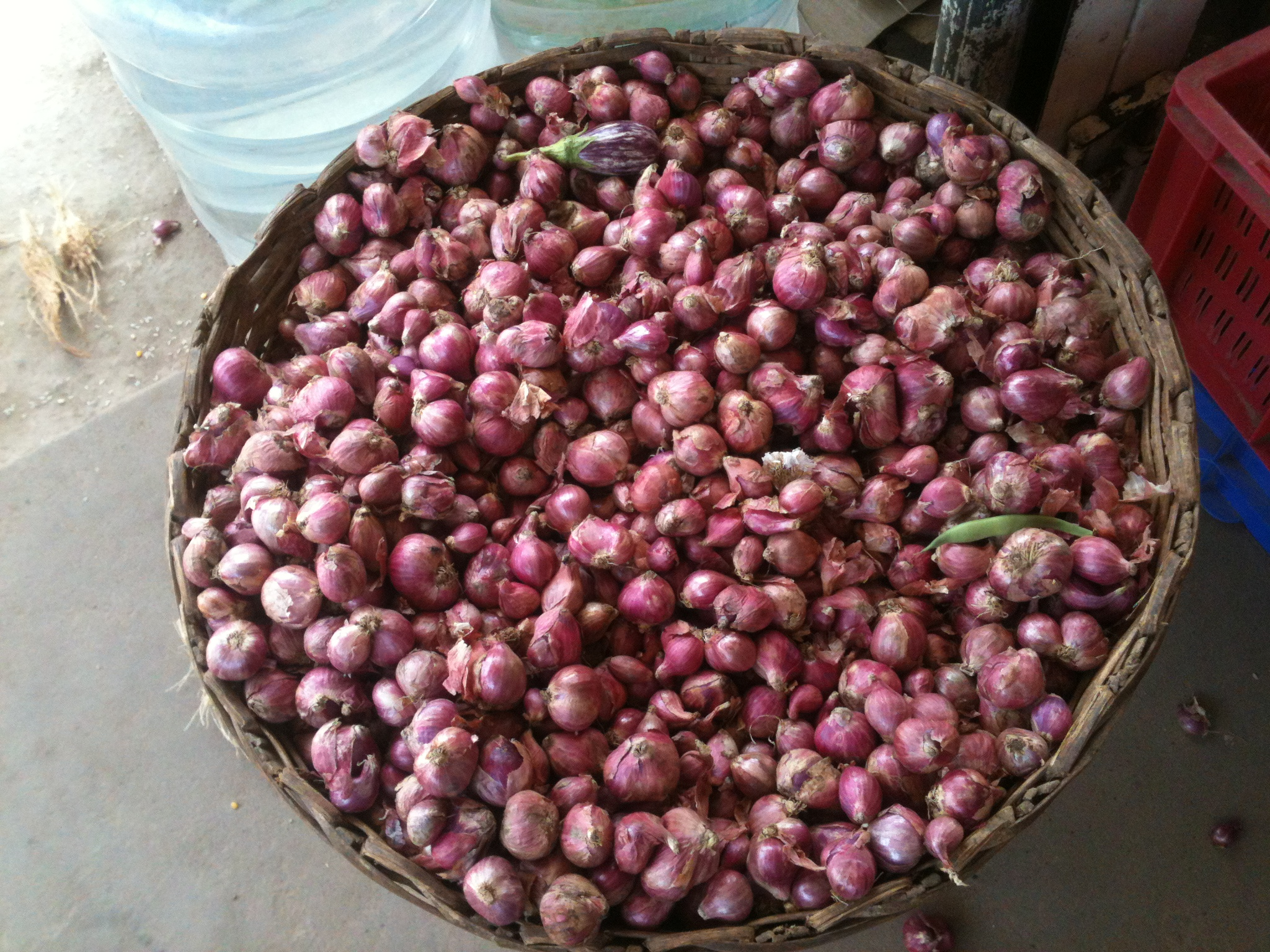
Shallots on sale in traditional market

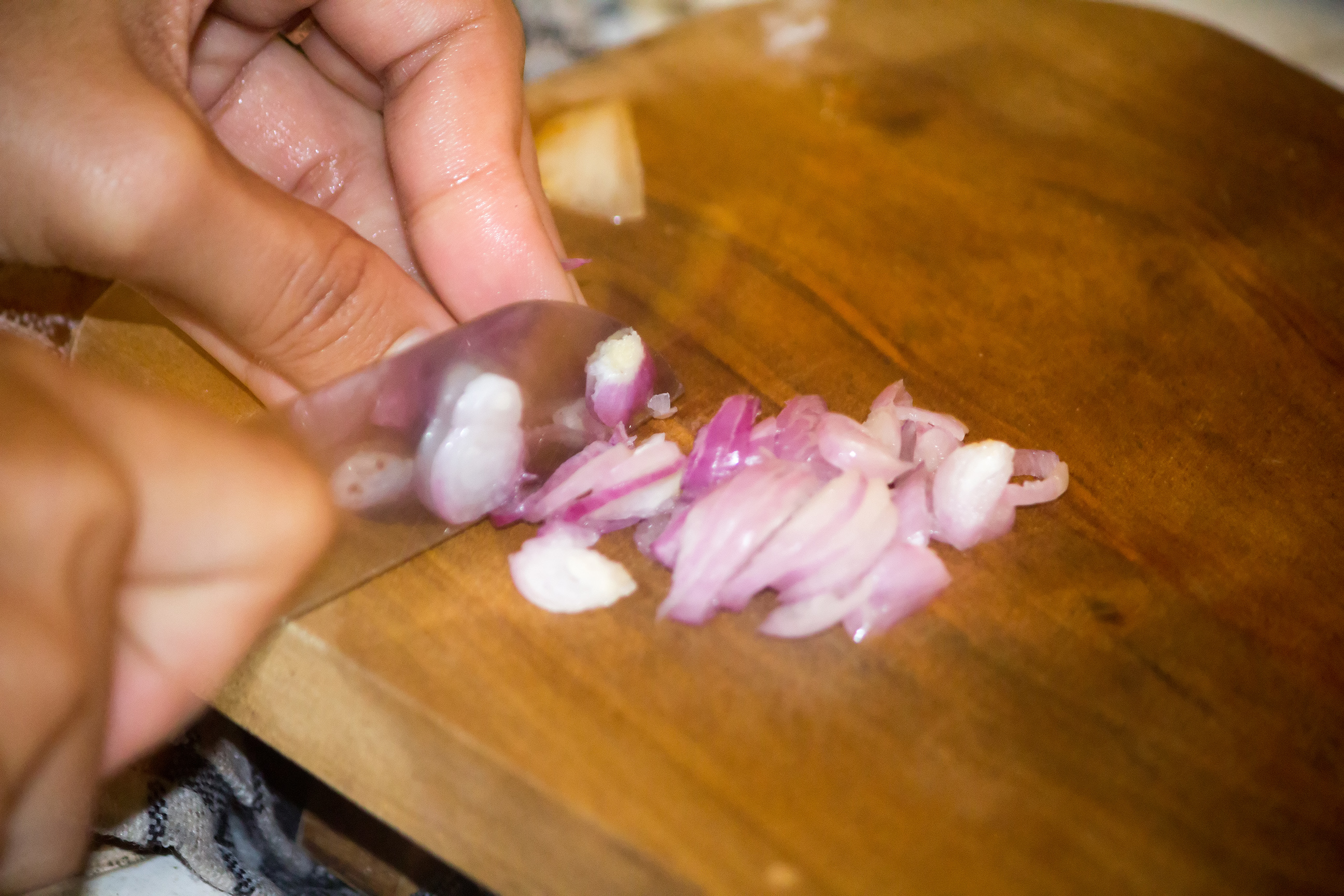
Chopping shallots thinly

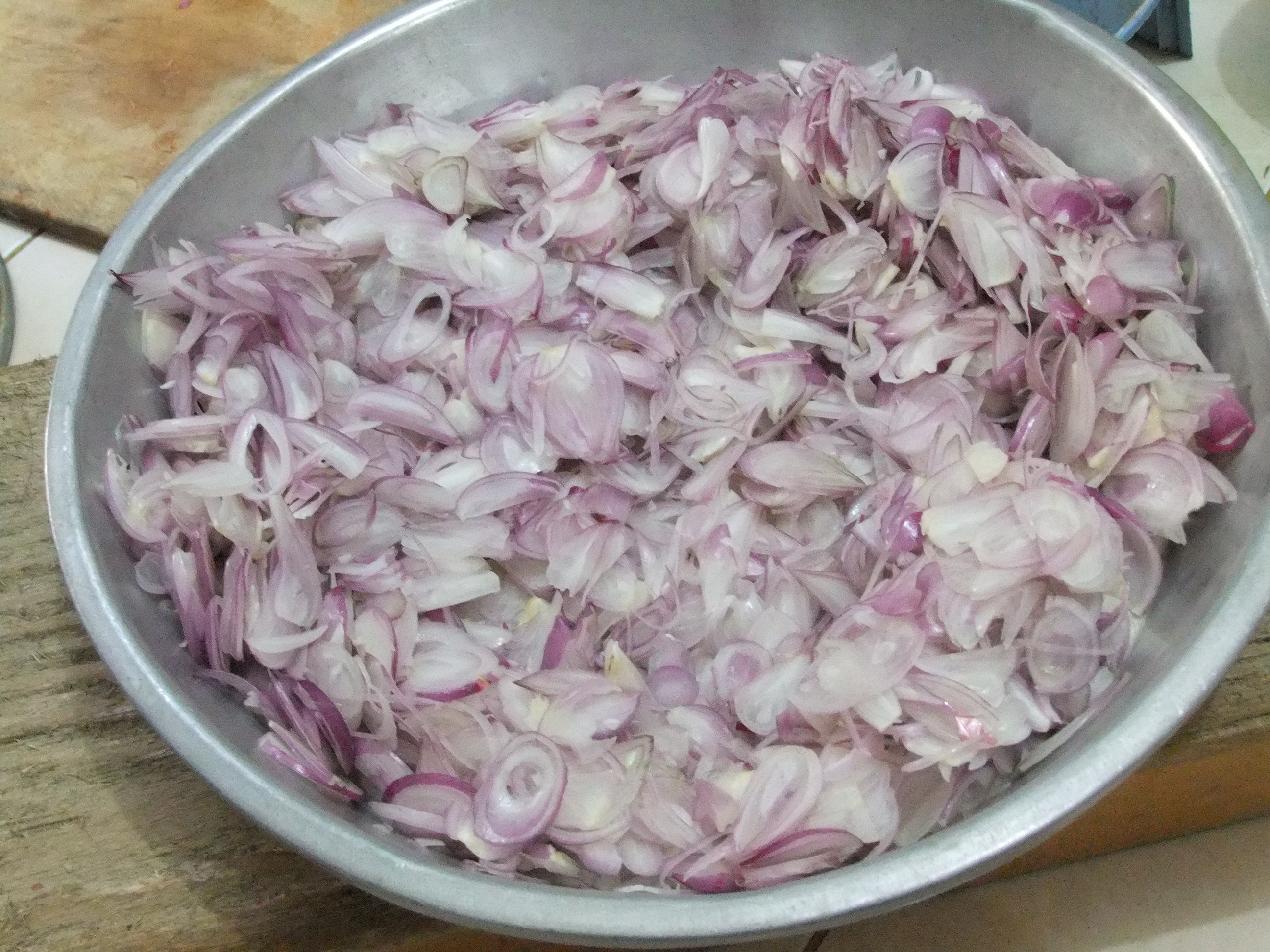
Sliced shallots ready for frying

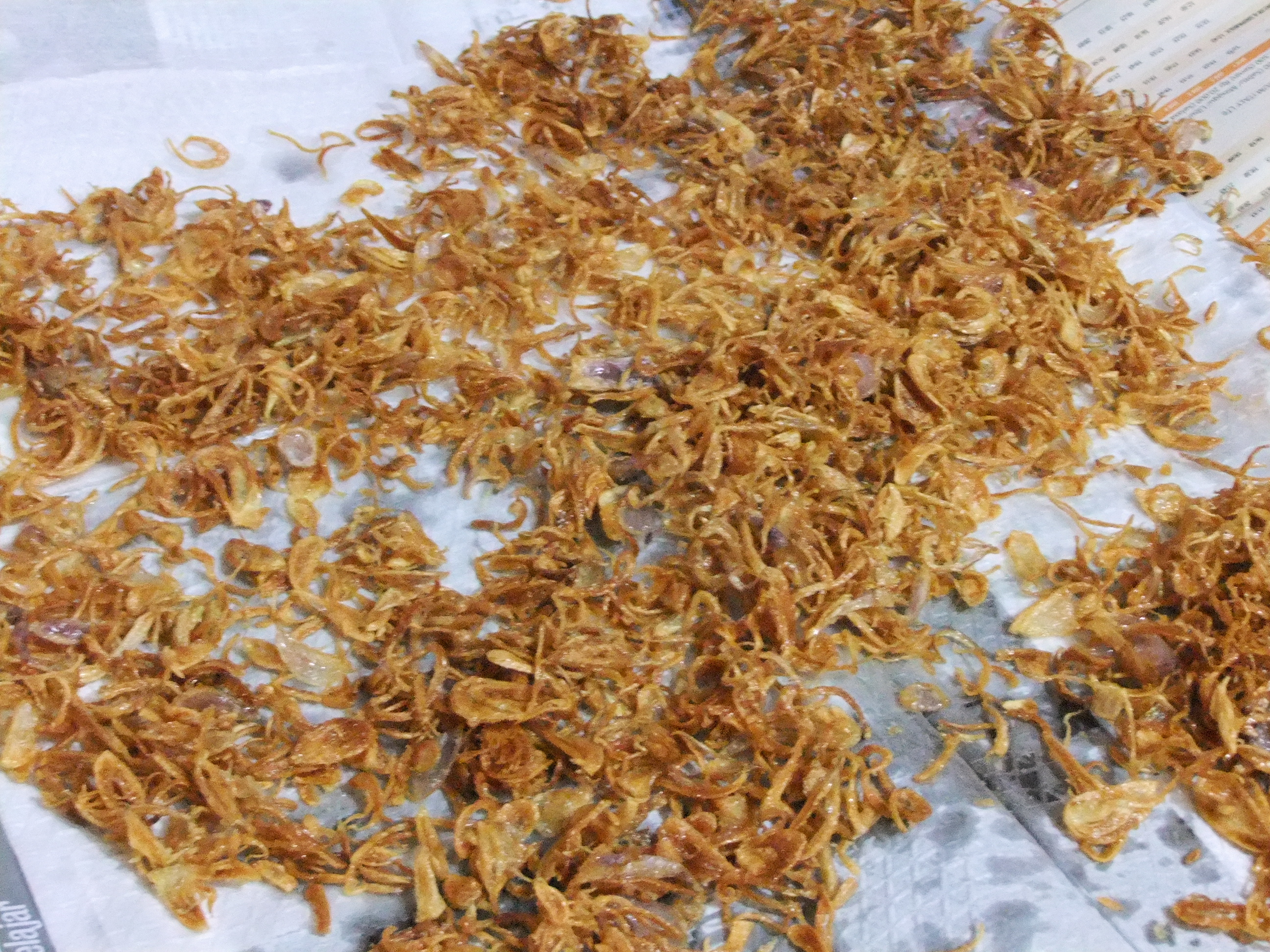
Bawang goreng crispy deep fried shallot ready to use

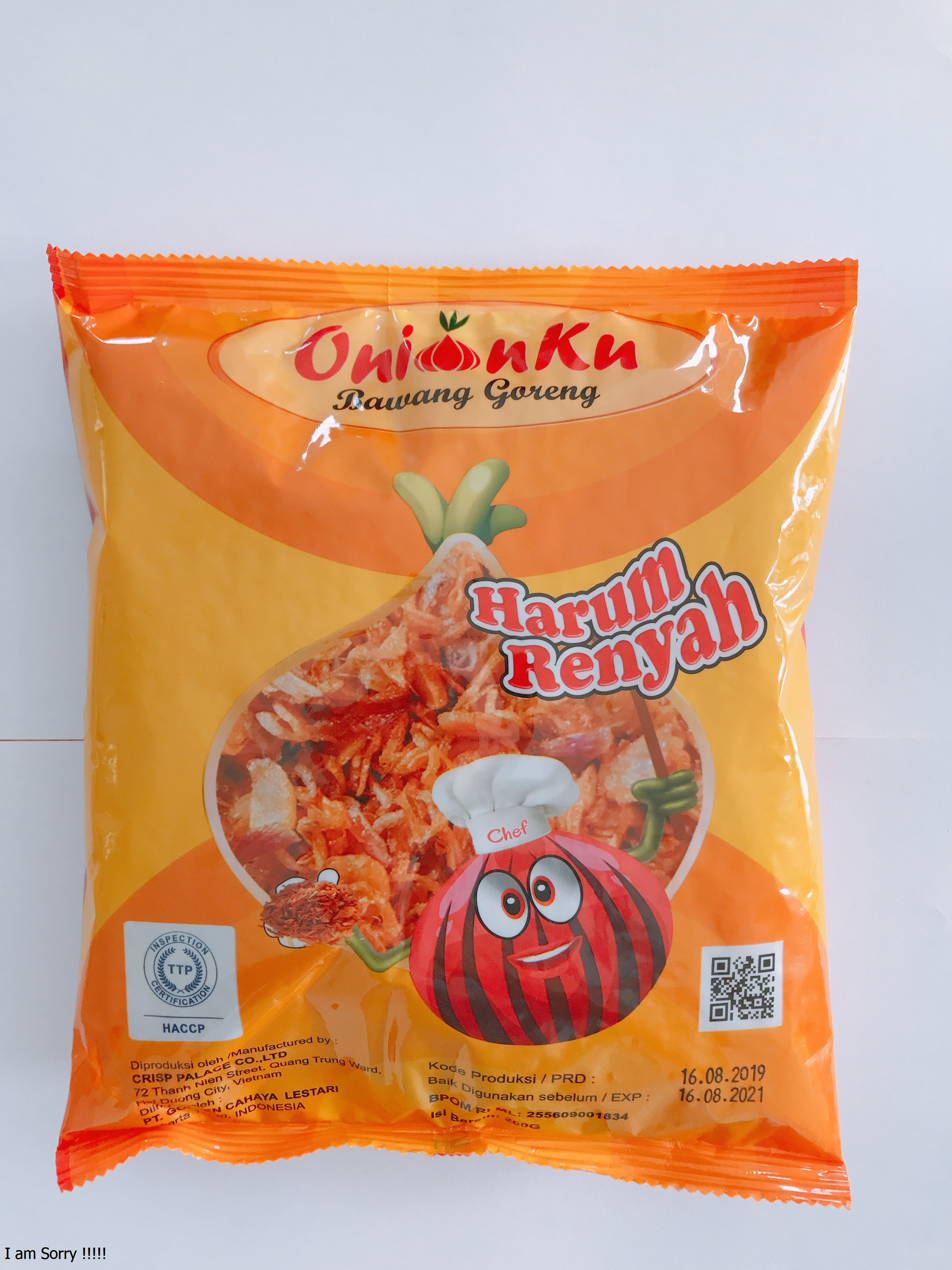
Prepacked ready to use bawang goreng

== Uses ==
Bawang goreng has a slightly bitter yet savoury flavour. Crispy fried shallots are often sprinkled upon steamed rice, fragrant coconut rice, fried rice, satay, soto, gado-gado, bubur ayam and many other dishes as a condiment as well as a garnish. They are used as toppings for stir-fries, vegetables, soups, stews, curries, noodles, rice and salads. Prepacked bawang goreng fried shallots are available in supermarkets and grocery stores in Indonesia, and also in Asian grocery stores abroad.

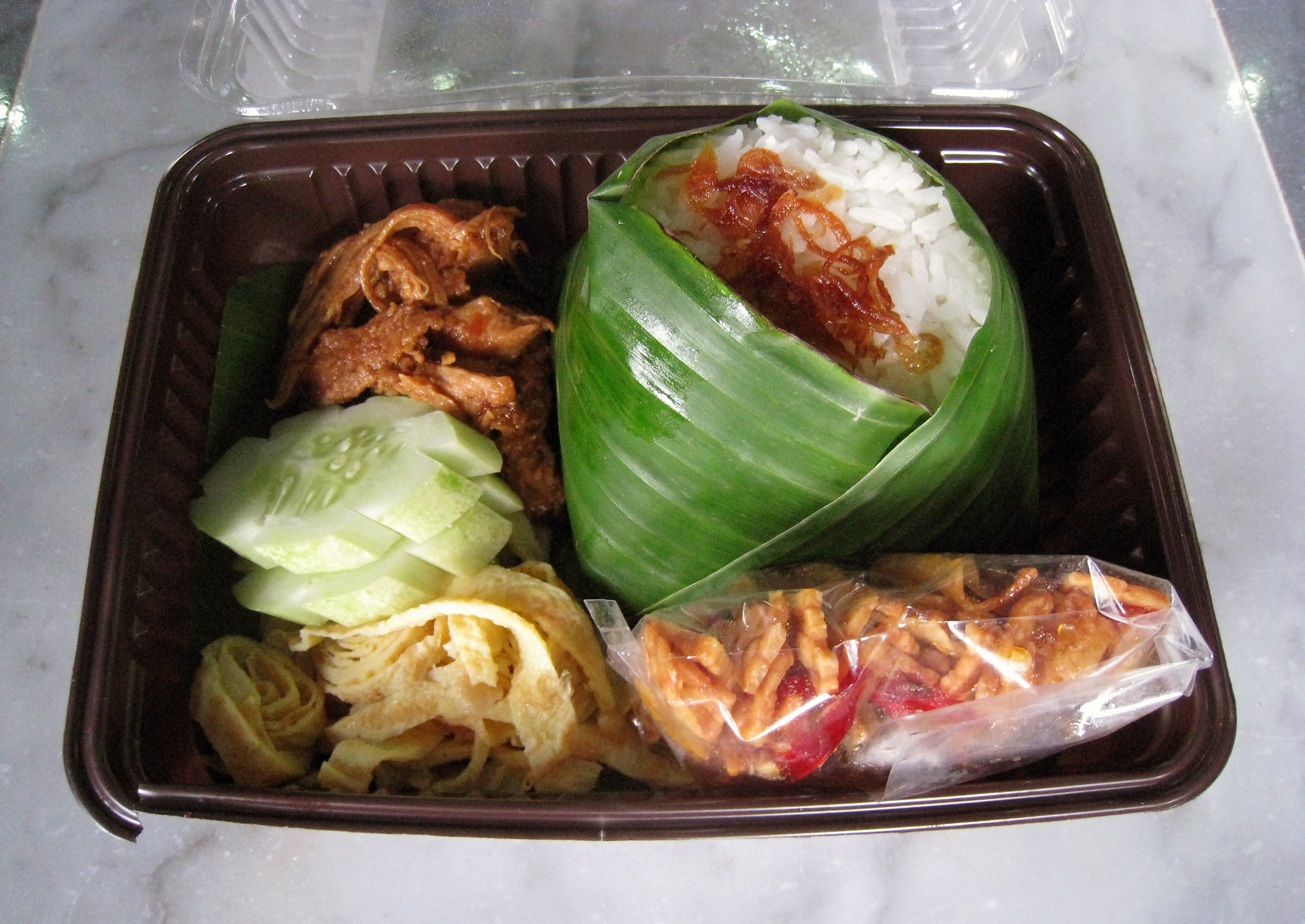
Nasi uduk fragrant coconut rice topped with bawang goreng

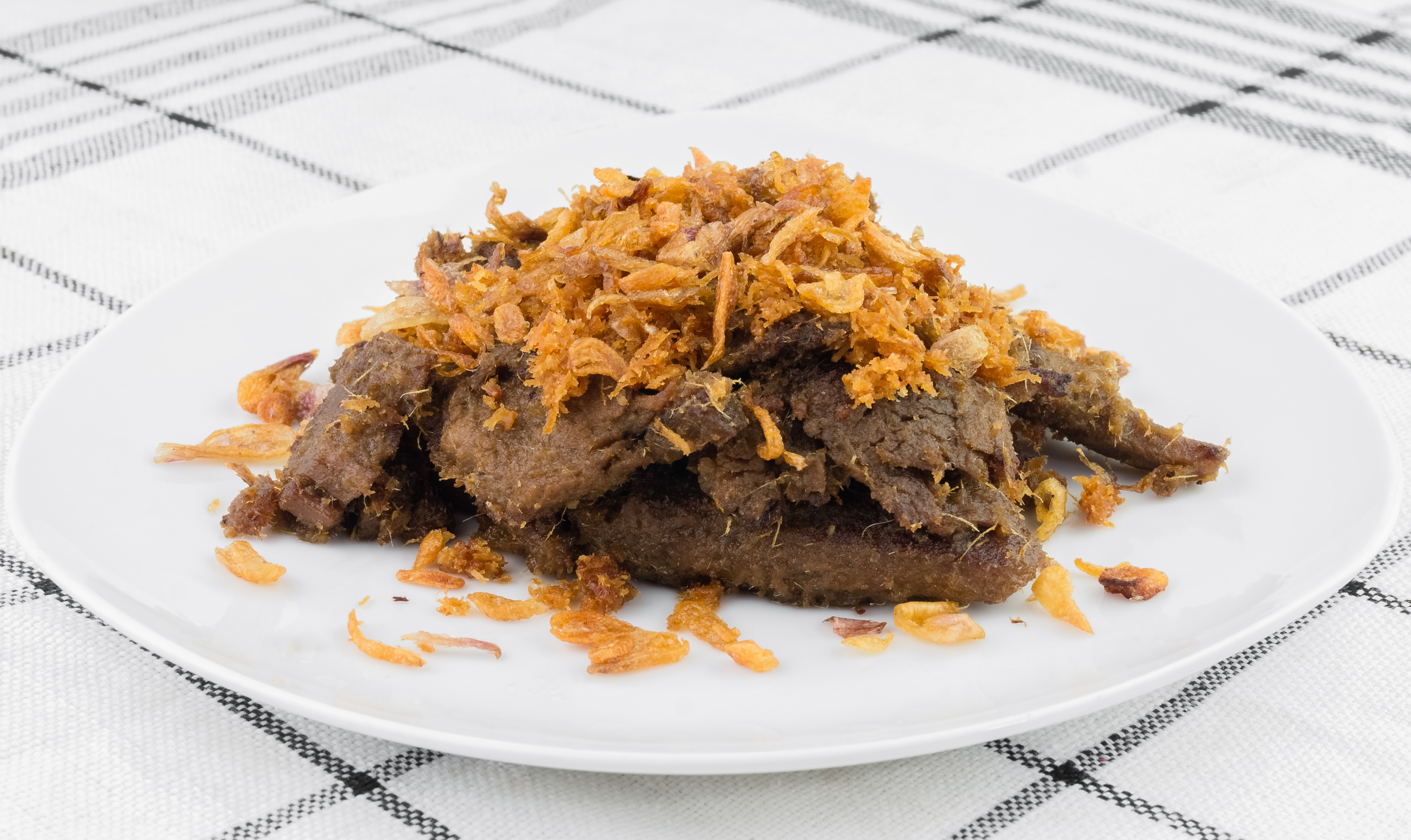
Gepuk sweet beef sprinkled with bawang goreng

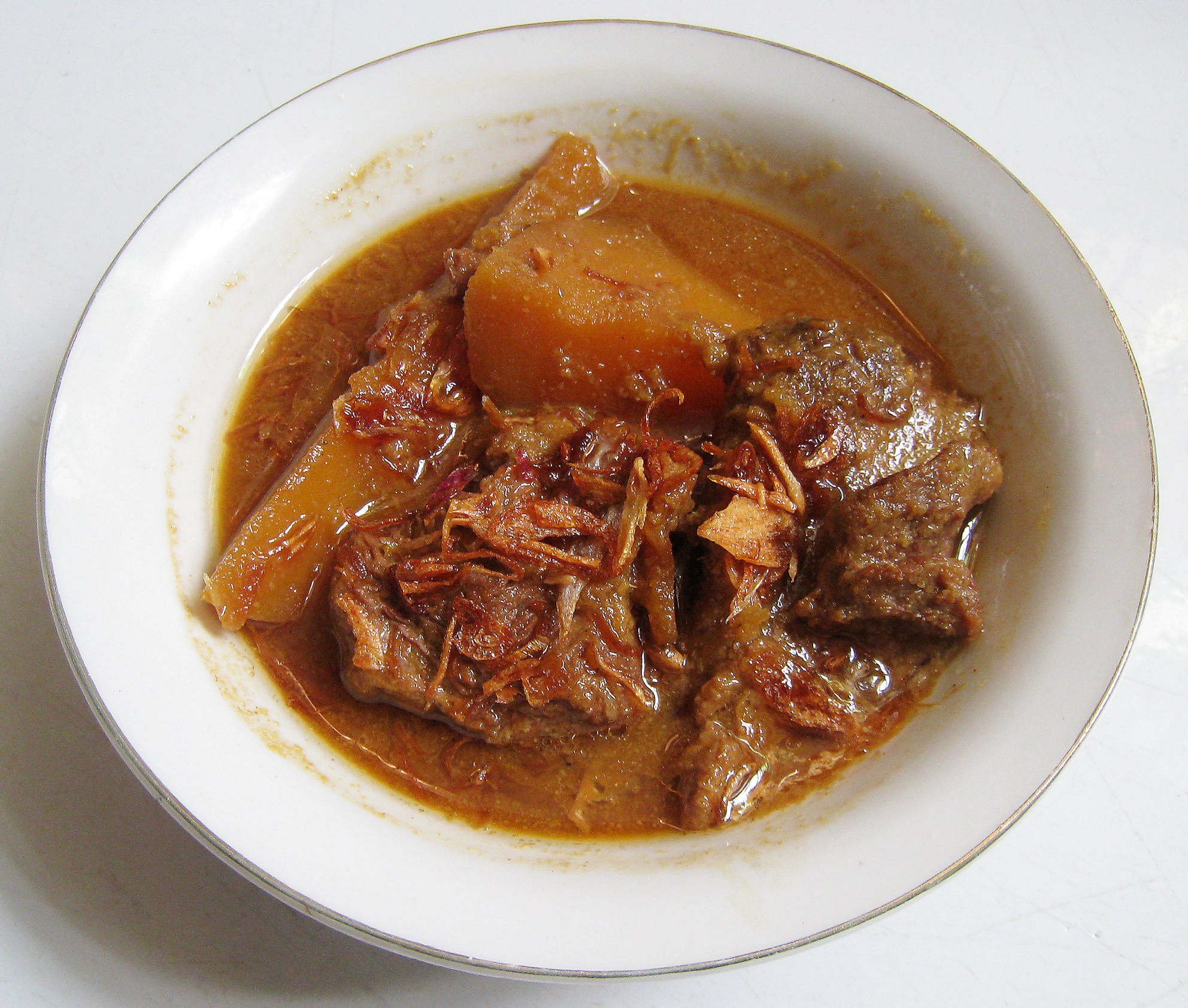
Semur beef stew sprinkled with bawang goreng

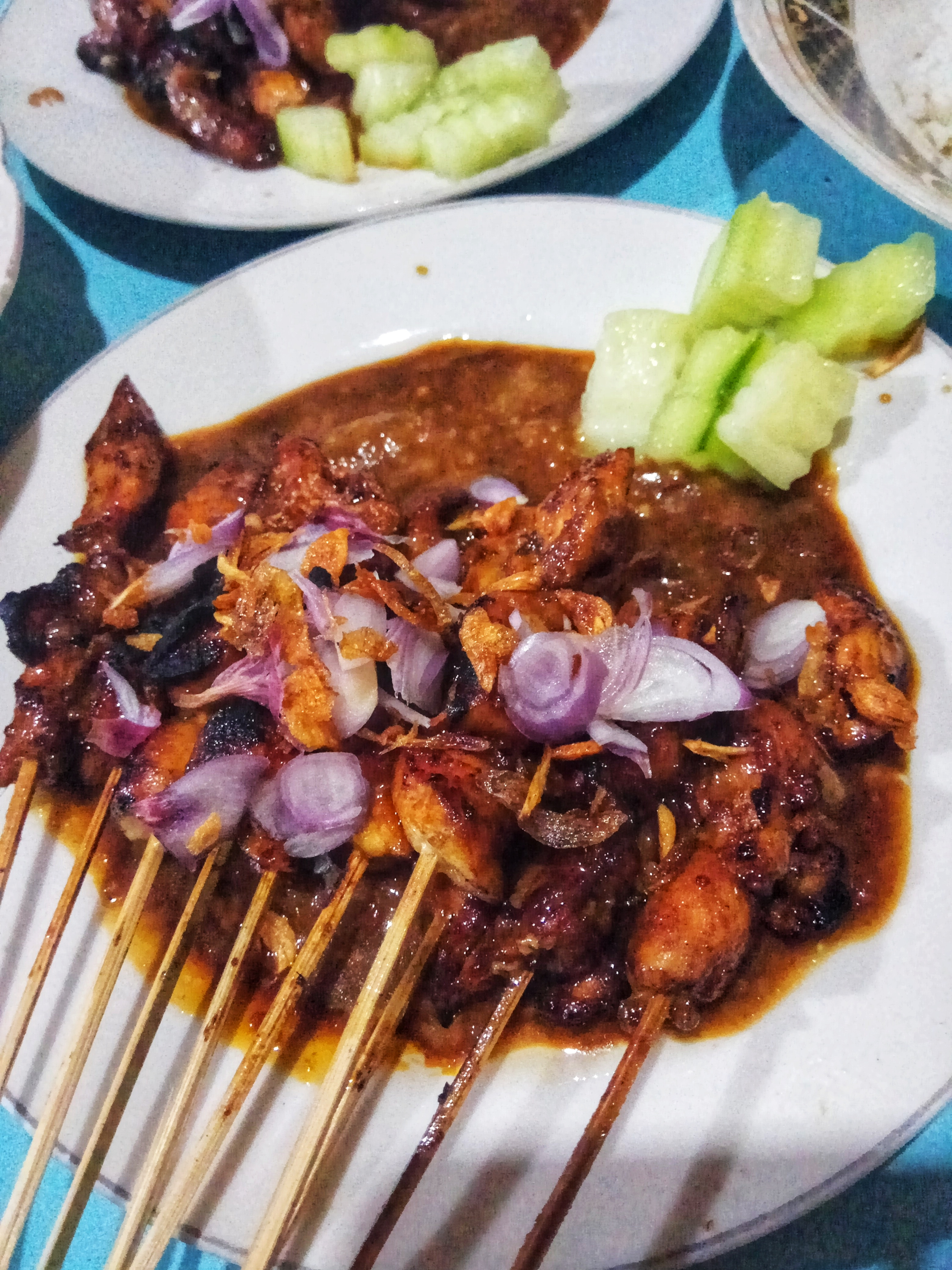
Chicken satay sprinkled with bawang goreng and sliced fresh shallot

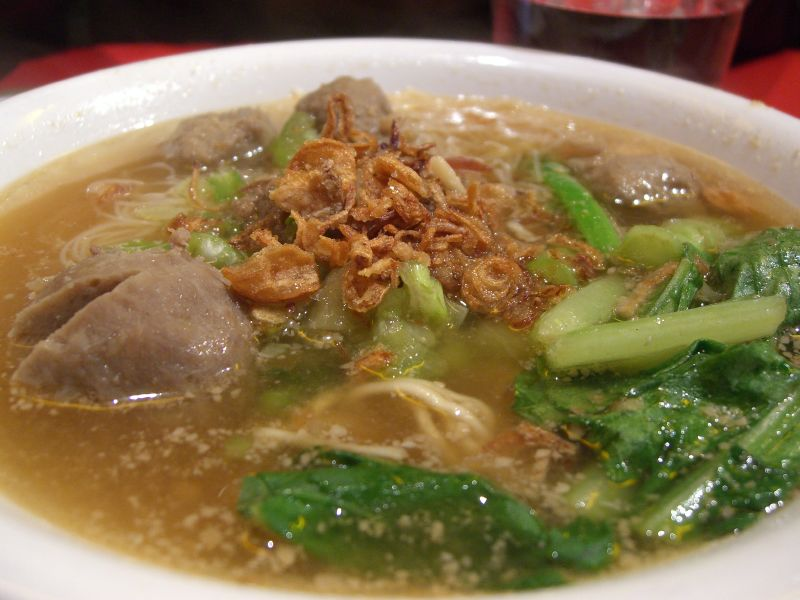
Bakso meatball soup topped with bawang goreng

== See also ==
- Emping
- Krupuk
- Sambal
- Kecap manis
- Acar
- Indonesian cuisine
