= Sarah Winstedt =

Irish physician and surgeon

Sarah Mary Josephine Winstedt
- Born: Sarah O'Flynn; 4 April 1886; Sixmilebridge, Ireland
- Died: 9 September 1972 (aged 86); Havant, United Kingdom
- Education: University of Edinburgh; London School of Tropical Medicine
- Occupations: Physician, Suffragette
- Spouse: Richard Olaf Winstedt (m. 1921)

Sarah Mary Josephine Winstedt (née O'Flynn; 4 April 1886 – 9 September 1972) was an Irish-born physician, surgeon and suffragist. She spent most of the period of 1913–1935 in British Malaya, and for her contributions to colonial healthcare she was posthumously inducted into the Singapore Women's Hall of Fame. She served in a medical capacity in both world wars, and was awarded the King George V Silver Jubilee Medal in 1935.

== Early life and education ==
Sarah O'Flynn was born in 1886 in Sixmilebridge, County Clare, to James O'Flynn, a wool miller, and his second wife, Margaret (née O'Halloran). She attended convent schools in Ireland and France and graduated MB ChB from the University of Edinburgh in 1912.

== Medical career ==
After graduation, O'Flynn was appointed an assistant in obstetrics at the Royal Free Hospital in London.

In 1913, after attending a course on tropical diseases at the London School of Tropical Medicine, O'Flynn joined the Colonial Medical Service and was sent to British Malaya. There, she ran the women's and children's ward at Kuala Lumpur Hospital and established a new hospital for women and children in the Kuala Pilah District. While the hospital was under construction, she travelled across the countryside by elephant and bicycle to deliver care; these home visits helped to increase trust in Western medicine among the rural population.

O'Flynn returned to Britain in 1916 to join the Royal Army Medical Corps. She served in Malta, Thessaloniki, and Fort Pitt in Kent, and after the war's end in 1919 she accompanied Lady Muriel Paget on a humanitarian mission to Russia. She then returned to Malaya in 1921 and married Richard Olaf Winstedt. She also joined the surgical unit at Singapore General Hospital and in 1932 she became the head of the hospital's newly established paediatric ward. She resigned in 1933 due to her husband's appointment as advisor to Johor but continued to volunteer at the Johor Bahru General Hospital.

Sarah and her husband returned to Britain in 1935, the same year that both received the King George V Silver Jubilee Medal.

In 1937–8, she served as the assistant director of the Marie Curie Hospital for women with cancer in Hampstead. In World War II she again joined the war effort: she accompanied children who were evacuated to Canada, examined new recruits for the Auxiliary Territorial Service, and served as an industrial medical officer at the Royal Arsenal. After the war, she held positions at an asylum in Dartford and at Middlesex County Council before retiring in 1952. She co-wrote a textbook, Tropical Hygiene for Schools, which was published in 1950–3.

== Activism ==
While working at the Royal Free Hospital, O'Flynn was also active in the campaign for women's suffrage; she once spent a week on a hunger strike at HM Prison Holloway after attempting to storm parliament with a group of protesters.

== Personal life ==
O'Flynn married Richard Olaf Winstedt, a colonial administrator, in 1921.

Winstedt died from bronchopneumonia in 1972 in Havant, Hampshire. In 2014, she was inducted into the Singapore Women's Hall of Fame and credited as "one of the [Malayan] colony's leading surgeons".
