= Richard Olaf Winstedt =

English Orientalist and colonial administrator (1878–1966)

Portrait by Walter Stoneman, 1927

Sir Richard Olaf Winstedt KBE CMG FBA (2 August 1878 – 2 June 1966), or more commonly R. O. Winstedt, was an English Orientalist and colonial administrator with expertise in British Malaya.

== Early life and education ==
Winstedt was born in Oxford and educated at Magdalen College School and New College, Oxford, from which he received an MA. His brother was Eric Otto Winstedt, a Latinist and gypsiologist.

In 1902 he became a cadet in the Federated Malay States Civil Service, and was posted to Perak where he studied Malay language and culture. In 1913 he was appointed District Officer in Kuala Pilah, and in 1916 appointed to the Education Department. In 1920 he received his DLitt degree from Oxford.

== Career ==
Winstedt served as the first President of Raffles College, Singapore, 1928–1931. During his presidency, he also served as acting Secretary to the High Commissioner, 1923, Director of Education for Straits Settlements and Federated Malay States (FMS), as a member of Legislative Council, Straits Settlements, 1924–1931 and as a member of the FMS Federal Council, 1927–1931. He was president of the Malayan Branch of the Royal Asiatic Society in 1927, 1929 and 1931. After a term as General Adviser to Johore, 1931–1935, Winstedt retired from the Malayan Civil Service.

He returned to England and was appointed Lecturer, then Reader, and ultimately Honorary Fellow, in Malay at the School of Oriental Studies in London, where he also served as a member of the Governing Body, 1939–1959. During World War II, he broadcast in Malay to Japanese-occupied Malaya. He retired from active teaching in 1946.

Winstedt served on numerous boards and advisory groups, most notably at the Royal Asiatic Society in London, of which he was repeatedly the president and a Gold Medallist in 1947. Other organisations included the Association of British Malaya, of which he was president in 1938, the Colonial Office Advisory Committee on Education, 1936–1939, and the Royal India Society. He was a Fellow of the British Academy, an Honorary Member of the Southeast Asia Institute, the Royal Batavian Society, and the Koninklijk Instituut voor Taal-, Land- en Volkenkunde.

== Accomplishments ==
Winstedt was instrumental in preserving several works of Malay literature including The Malay Annals as well as producing important works regarding the Malays and their language such as A History of Malaya and A Dictionary of Malay Language. According to Australian Journal of Politics and History, "Winstedt was the first British scholar to make a systematic survey of Malay material for historical purposes, and laid the true foundation of a scientific approach to the writing of Malayan history."

He also played an important role in the Malayan and Singaporean education system. Specifically, he was interested in educating the Malays. Upon his suggestion, Sultan Idris Training College was established in 1922 with the purpose of producing Malay teachers. In 1997, the Malaysian government upgraded the institution into a university, Sultan Idris Education University.

In the 1926 Birthday Honours list, Winstedt was made a Companion of the Order of St Michael and St George (CMG) by the British sovereign to honour his contributions. He was made Knight Commander of the Order of the British Empire in 1935, and received an Honorary LLD from University of Malaya in 1951.

Winstedt's papers are archived at the School of Oriental and African Studies.

== Personal life ==
Winstedt married Sarah Winstedt (née O'Flynn), a physician and surgeon with the Colonial Medical Service whom he had met in Kuala Pilah, in 1921.

== Selected works ==
=== History and society ===
- Arts and Crafts (Papers on Malay Subjects; Malay industries, pt. 1), Kuala Lumpur: F.M.S. Government Press, 1909.
- The Circumstances of Malay Life: The kampong. The house. Furniture. Dress. Food (Papers on Malay Subjects; no. 2), Kuala Lumpur: F.M.S. Government Press, 1909.
- Fishing, Hunting and Trapping (Papers on Malay Subjects; Malay industries, pt. 2), Kuala Lumpur: F.M.S. Government Press, 1911.
- Malayan Memories, Singapore: Kelly & Walsh, 1916.
- Malaya: the Straits Settlements and the Federated and Unfederated Malay States, London: Constable, 1923.
- Shaman, Saiva and Sufi: A Study of the Evolution of Malay Magic, London: Constable, 1925.
- A History of Johore, Singapore, 1932.
- A Malay History of Riau and Johore, etc. (Malay text of the Tuḣfat al-nafīs), Singapore, 1932.
- Right Thinking and Right Living: A Primer On Moral & Social Topics, etc., Singapore : Malaya Publishing House, 1933.
- A History of Perak, Singapore, 1934.
- A History of Malaya, JMBRAS vol.13, Singapore, 1935.
- Britain and Malaya, 1786–1941, London, 1944.
- The Malays: A Cultural History, Singapore: Kelly & Walsh, 1947.

=== Language and texts ===
- Cherita jenaka: ya-itu Pa Kadok, Pa Pandir, Lebai Malang, Pa Belalang, Si Lunchai, Singapore: Methodist Publishing House, 1908 (folk tales, written down by Raja Haji Yahya; joint editor with A. J. Sturrock).
  - New ed. Kuala Lumpur: Oxford University Press, 1963
- Hikayat Anggun Che Tunggal, Singapore: Methodist Publishing House, 1914 (folk tale; joint editor with A. J. Sturrock).
- Pantun Melayu, Singapore: Methodist Publishing House, 1914 (Malay Literature Series). Co-author: Richard James Wilkinson.
- An English-Malay Dictionary, 2 vols. Singapore: Kelly & Walsh, 1914–15 (2nd ed. 1922, 3rd ed. 1939).
- Colloquial Malay: a simple grammar with conversations, Singapore: Kelly & Walsh, 1916 (later editions: 2nd 1920, 3rd 1929, 4th 1938, revised 1945)
- A Malay Reader, Oxford: Clarendon Press, 1917.
- Misa Melayu; by Raja Chulan, Singapore: Methodist Publishing House, 1919 (editor; reissued in 1966 by Pustaka Antara, Kuala Lumpur).
- Dictionary of Colloquial Malay: Malay-English & English-Malay, Singapore: Kelly & Walsh, 1920 (reissued several times until 1951).
- A Malay History of Riau and Johore, etc. (Malay text of the Tuḣfat al-nafīs), Singapore, 1932.
- Negri Sembilan - The History, Polity and Beliefs of the Nine States, JMBRAS vol.12, Singapore, 1934.
- The Malay Annals or Sejarah Melayu, JMBRAS vol.16, Singapore, 1938.
- A Simple Malay Reader, London: Kegan Paul & Co., 1944.

=== Memoirs ===
- Start from Alif, Count from One: An Autobiographical Memoir, Oxford University Press, 1969.

== See also ==
- Pengkalan Kempas Historical Complex
