= Sayur asem =

Indonesian vegetable soup dish

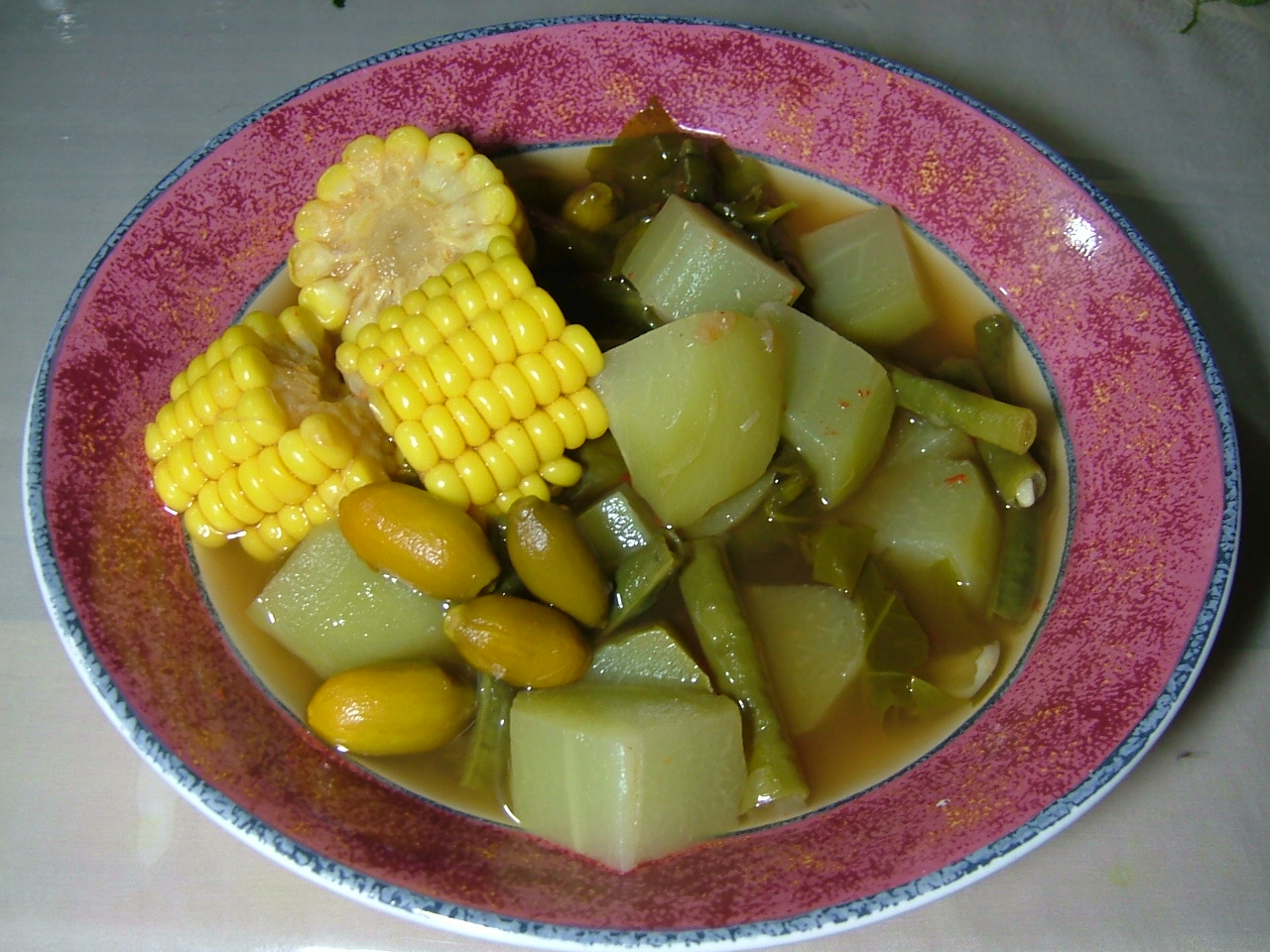
- Sayur asem
- Course: main course
- Place of origin: Indonesia
- Region or state: Jakarta, West Java, Banten
- Associated cuisine: Southeast Asia
- Serving temperature: hot and room temperature
- Main ingredients: various vegetables in tamarind soup

Sayur asem or sayur asam is an Indonesian vegetable soup. It is a popular Southeast Asian dish originating from Sundanese cuisine, consisting of vegetables in tamarind soup.

The sweet and sour flavour of this dish is considered refreshing and very compatible with fried or grilled dishes, including salted fish, ikan goreng, ayam goreng and lalapan, a kind of vegetable salad usually served raw but can also be cooked, and is usually eaten with steamed rice and sambal terasi chilli paste.

The origin of the dish can be traced to the Sundanese people of West Java, Banten, and the Jakarta region. It is well known to be a part of the Sundanese cuisine and the daily diet of the Betawi.

Earlier versions of the dish did not include corn, as it was not introduced to the Indonesian archipelago until the 16th Century.

== Ingredients ==
Common ingredients are peanuts, young jackfruit, young leaves and unpeeled seeds of melinjo, bilimbi, chayote, and long beans; These are all cooked in tamarind-based soups and sometimes enriched with beef stock. Quite often, the recipe also includes corn.

== Variants ==
Several variations exist, including sayur asem Jakarta (a version from the Betawi people of Jakarta), sayur asem kangkung (a version which includes water spinach), sayur asem ikan asin (includes salted fish, usually snakehead murrel), sayur asem talas (with taro and its stems and leaves), and sayur asem kacang merah (consists of red beans and green beans in tamarind and beef stock). The Karo version of sayur asem is made using torch ginger buds and, more importantly, the sour-tasting seed pods. Sayur asem rembang is a vegetable soup with a sour flavor.

Sayur asem

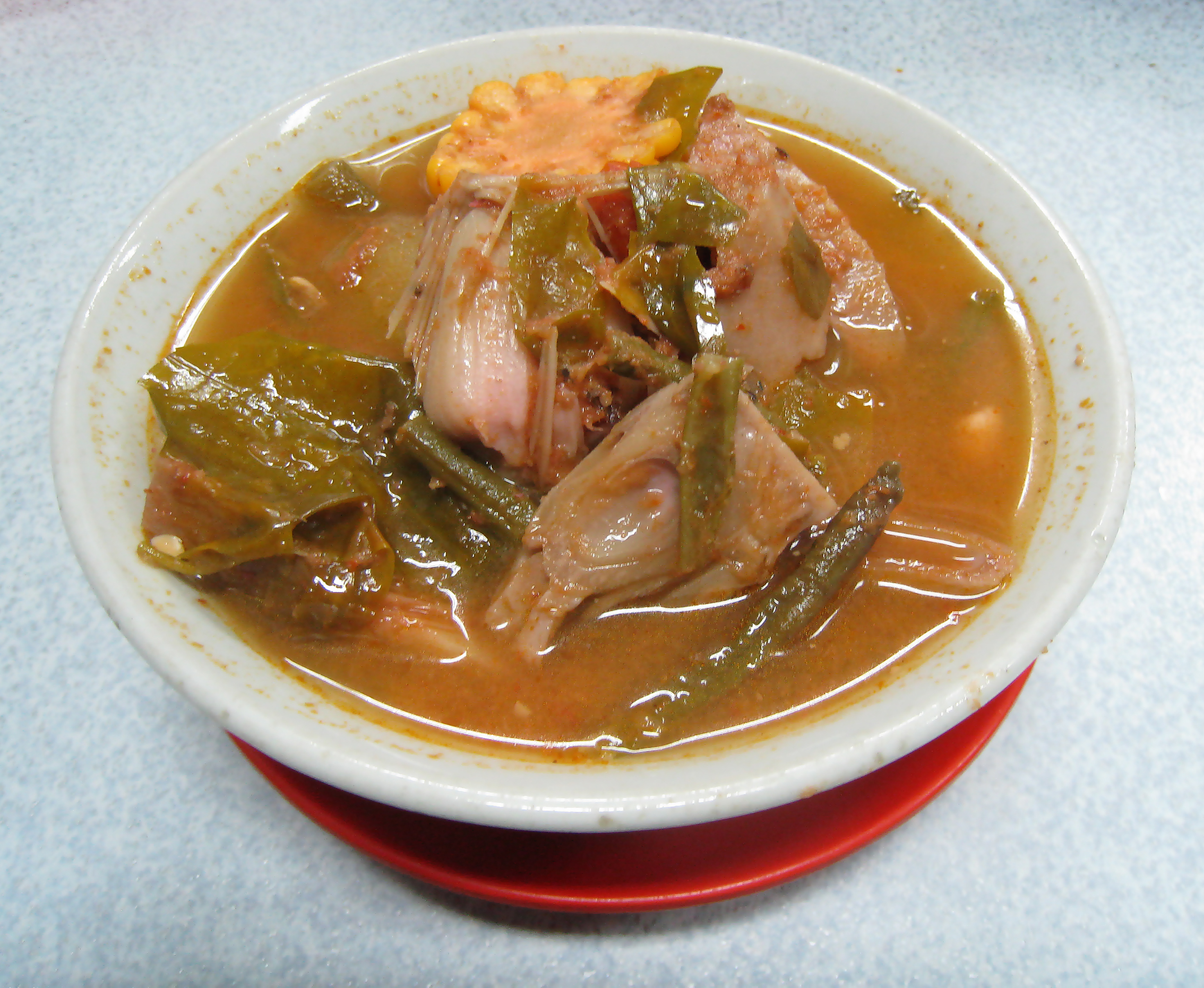

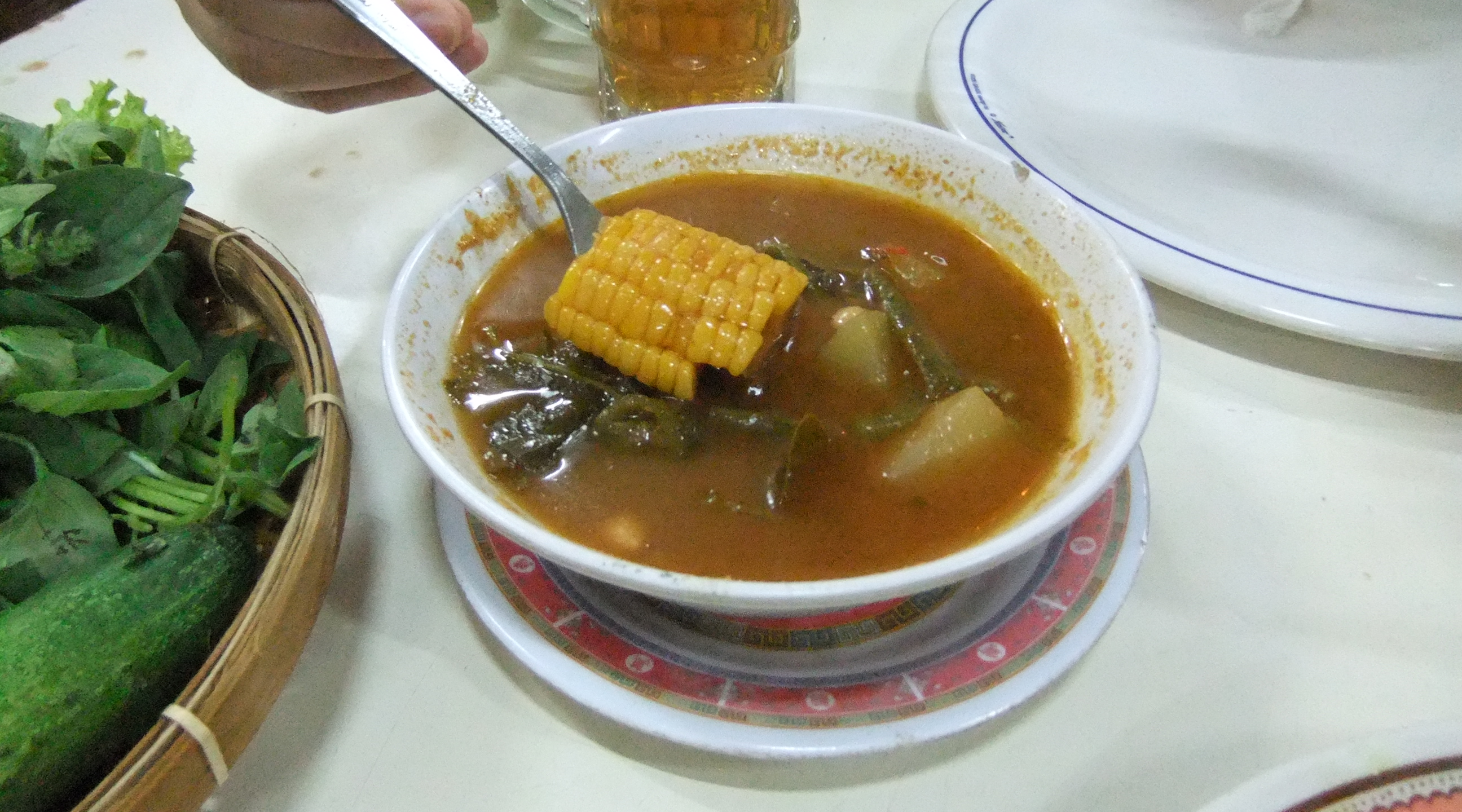

== See also ==
- Tamarind juice
- Sinigang
- Puchero
- List of Indonesian soups
- List of soups
- List of vegetable soups
