= Pecel lele =

Indonesian deep-fried catfish dish

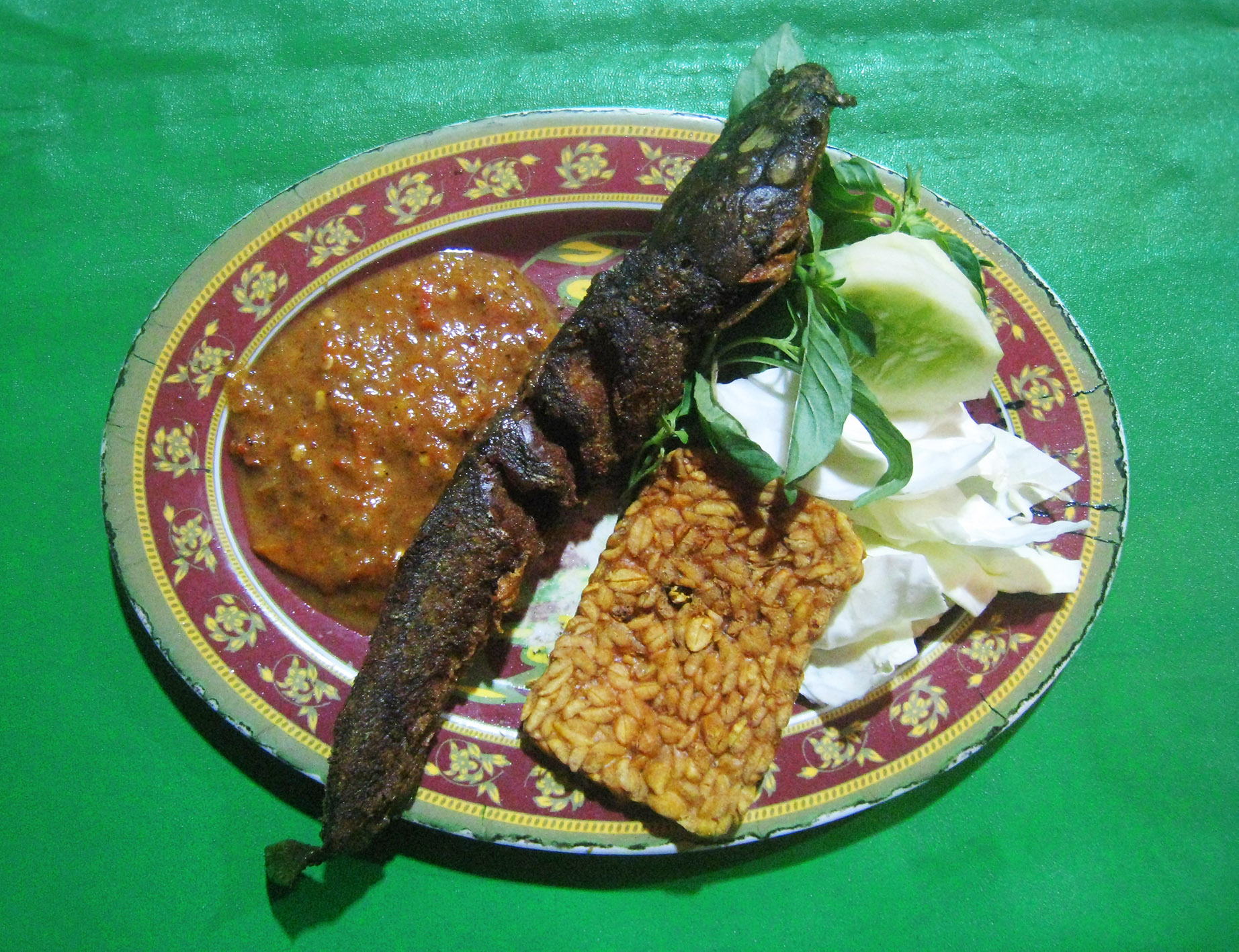
- Pecel lele served with sambal, tempeh and lalab vegetables, usually sold in humble tents (warung).
- Alternative names: Pecel lele, pecak lele
- Course: Main course
- Place of origin: Indonesia
- Region or state: Lamongan, East Java province, nationwide in Indonesia and Maritime Southeast Asia
- Serving temperature: Hot
- Main ingredients: Clarias catfish served with sambal traditional chili paste

Pecel lele or pecak lele is an Indonesian deep-fried Clarias catfish dish originating from Lamongan, East Java, Indonesia. It consists of catfish served with traditional sambal chili paste, often accompanied by fried tempeh and/or tofu, fresh raw vegetables (lalapan), and steamed rice.

Although it shares the word pecel with another Javanese dish, pecel (a vegetable salad in peanut sauce), pecel lele is unrelated to that preparation. Pecel lele is served with sambal terasi (ground chili with shrimp paste), though some regional recipes incorporate small amounts of ground peanuts into the sambal.

== History ==
Pecel lele is associated with Lamongan, a regency in East Java west of Surabaya. The dish was carried out of Lamongan in the 1970s by migrants who moved to Jakarta seeking economic opportunities, and over time spread throughout Indonesia. Early Lamongan vendors in Jakarta initially marketed their food as soto Surabaya rather than soto Lamongan because the Lamongan regency was less familiar to Jakartans than the nearby provincial capital of Surabaya.

Today, pecel lele is widely available across Indonesia, with the heaviest concentration of vendors in Java, and has spread to neighbouring countries with Javanese diaspora communities including Singapore and Malaysia.

== Preparation ==
The fish, typically a whole walking catfish (lele), is cleaned, sometimes lightly seasoned, and deep-fried in oil until the skin is crisp and the flesh is fully cooked. It is then served on a platter or in a clay mortar (cobek) with freshly ground sambal, raw vegetables for lalapan (typically cabbage, cucumber, basil, and long beans), and a portion of plain or coconut-flavoured rice (nasi uduk). The sambal may be a tomato-based sambal terasi or a simpler garlic-and-chili sambal bawang, depending on the vendor's regional style.

== Vendor banner culture ==
Pecel lele vendors are typically associated with a distinctive style of hand-painted banner that has become a recognisable symbol of Lamongan migrant identity in Jakarta and other Indonesian cities. The banners, traditionally placed at the front and two sides of each warung (tent-style food stall), feature a white background, colored block lettering, and stylized illustrations of catfish and chickens, the latter reflecting that most pecel lele stalls also sell pecel ayam (fried chicken) and soto ayam (chicken noodle soup).

The hand-painted banner style is widely attributed to Teguh Wahono, a painter based in Bulutengger village in Lamongan, who is credited as the pioneer of the form. The banners have continued to be produced by hand despite the availability of digital printing, with a typical canvas-painted banner lasting approximately six months before weather damage requires replacement.

Customers at pecel lele warungs typically pay less than Rp 30,000 (approximately US$2) per portion, making the dish broadly accessible across income levels and a frequent late-night meal in Indonesian cities.

== See also ==
- Ikan goreng
- Ikan bakar
- Pecel
- Sambal
