= Gepuk =

Indonesian sweet and spicy fried beef dish

Empal gepuk
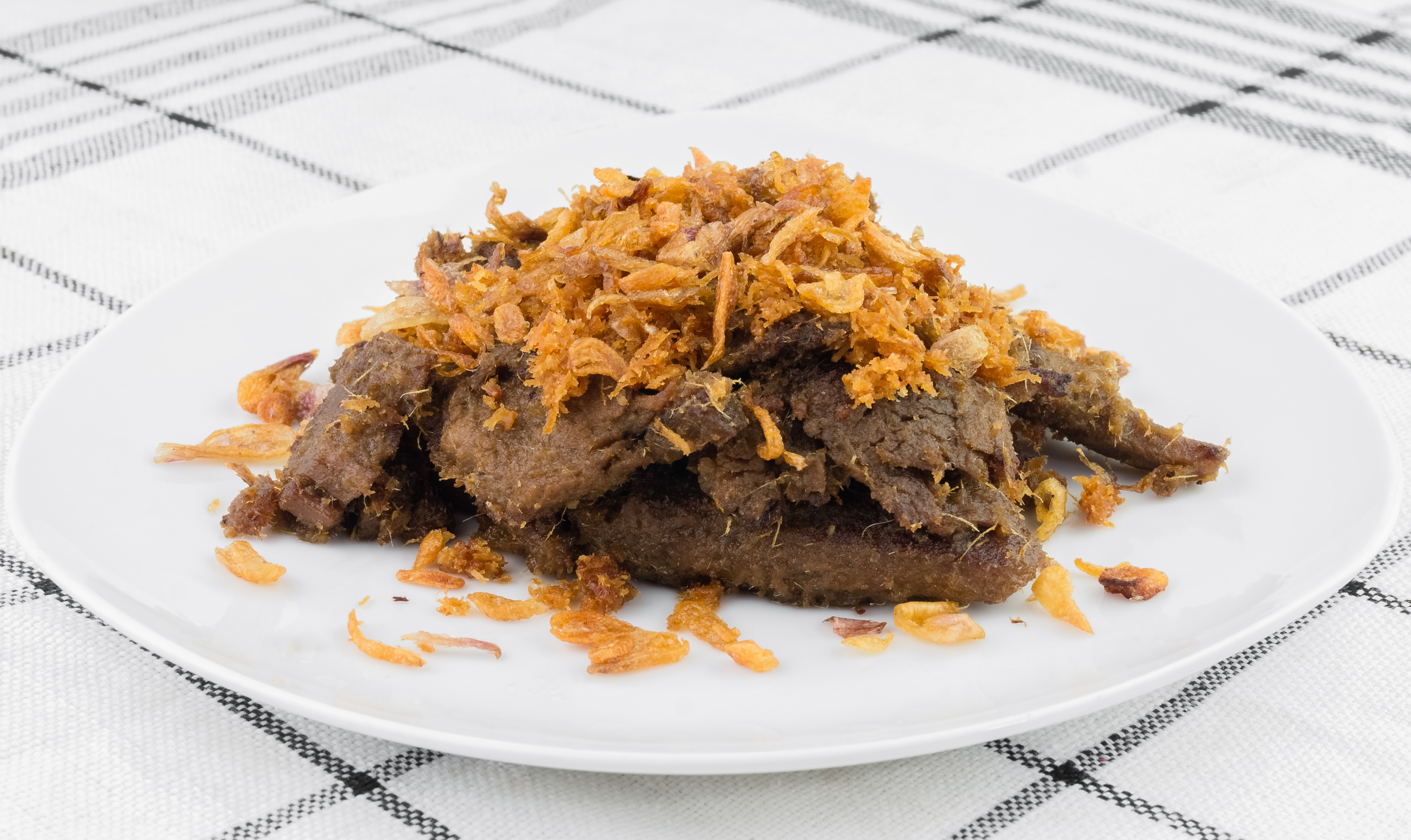
- Empal gepuk sweet fried beef sprinkled with bawang goreng
- Alternative names: Empal or Gepuk
- Course: Main course
- Place of origin: Indonesia
- Region or state: West Java
- Serving temperature: Hot or room temperature
- Main ingredients: Sweet spiced fried beef

Empal gepuk or sometimes simply known just as empal or gepuk is an Sundanese cuisine sweet and spicy fried beef dish. This dish is commonly popular in Java island, but can trace its origin to the Sundanese cuisine of West Java, Indonesia.

== Ingredients ==
The beef preferably used in this dish is beef shank. In There are several steps to prepare empal gepuk. First, the beef is boiled until medium well, then cut quite thickly along the muscle fiber into half-palm size. Then, using stone pestle and mortar, the beef pieces are beaten mildly to loosen the meat fibers and spread its size a little bit. The spices used in this dish are ground shallot, garlic, chili pepper, coriander, palm sugar, and salt, mixed with bruised lemongrass, galangal, daun salam (Indonesian bay leaf), a little coconut milk, and turmeric water. The meat pieces are cooked with the spices well until they are absorbed into the meat and the stock evaporate. Then the meat pieces are fried in coconut oil until the color darken and the meat is done. Empal gepuk is sprinkled with bawang goreng (fried shallot) and served with steamed rice. This fried beef dish tastes succulent with mild sweetness acquired from palm sugar and a hint of spiciness.

== Gallery ==
empal gepuk

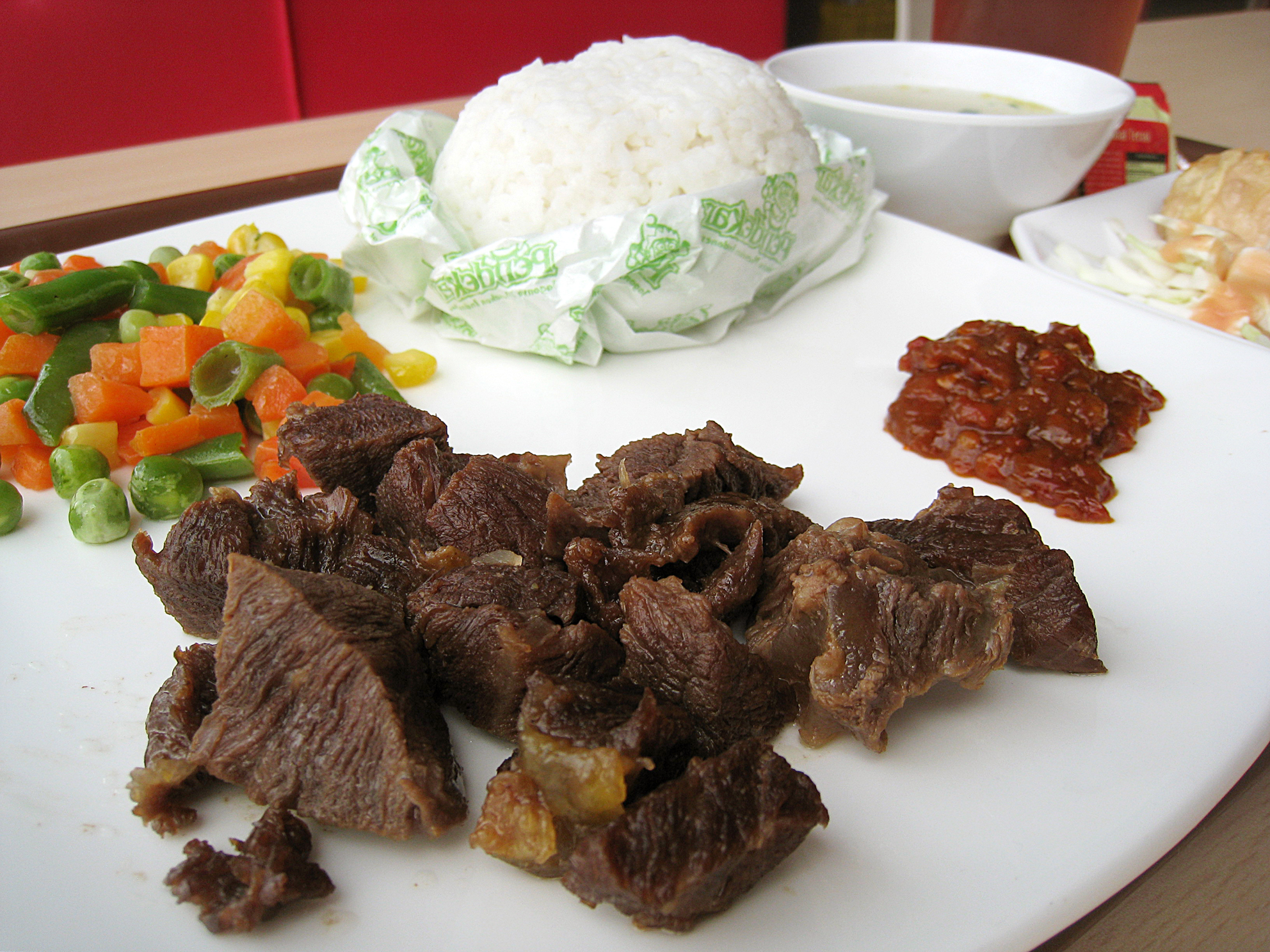
Empal gepuk with vegetables, rice and sambal

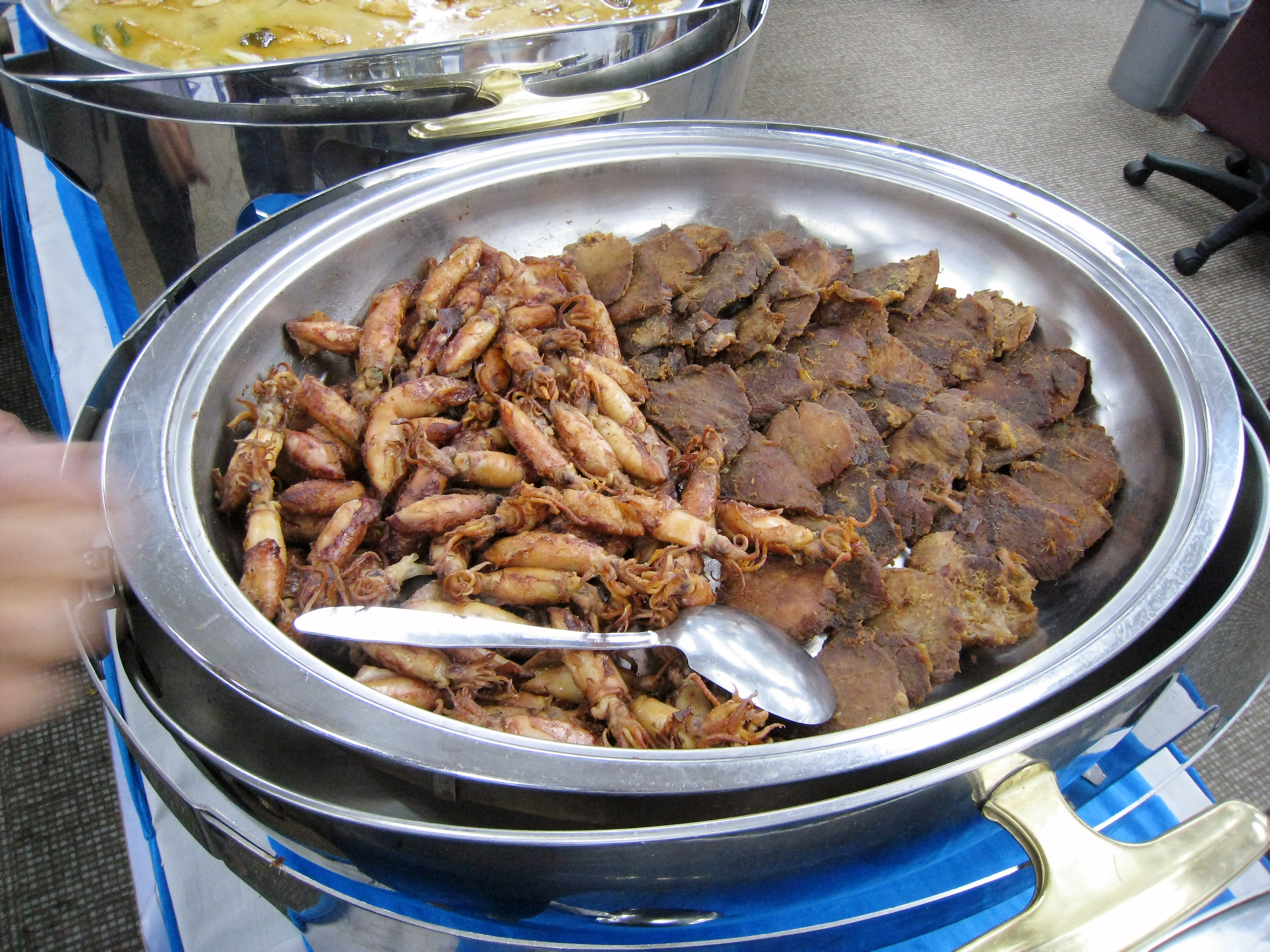
Empal gepuk and salted squids in buffet

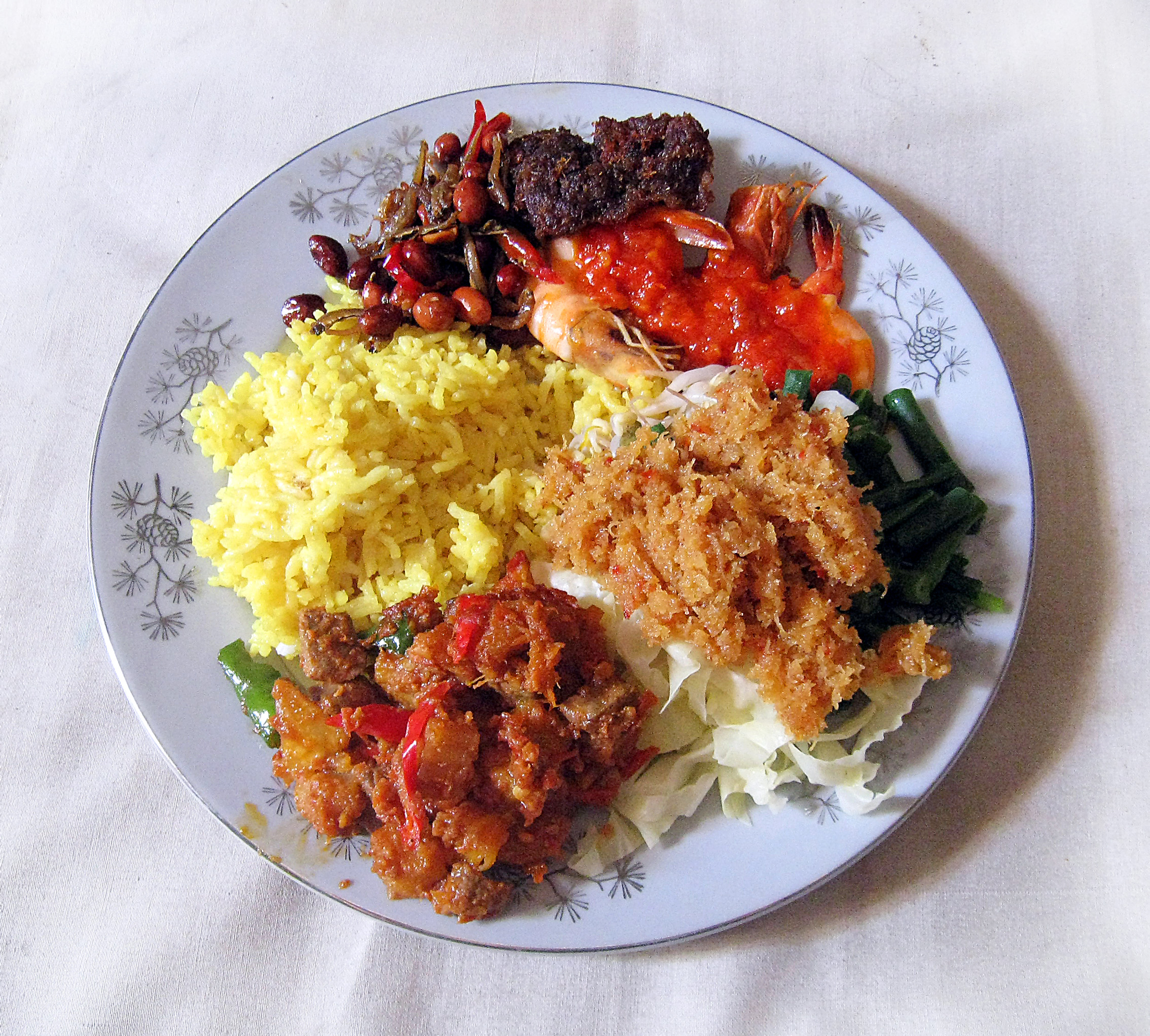
Empal gepuk as part of nasi kuning

== See also ==
- Empal gentong
- Rendang
