= Sundanese cuisine =

Cuisine of the Sundanese people of Indonesia

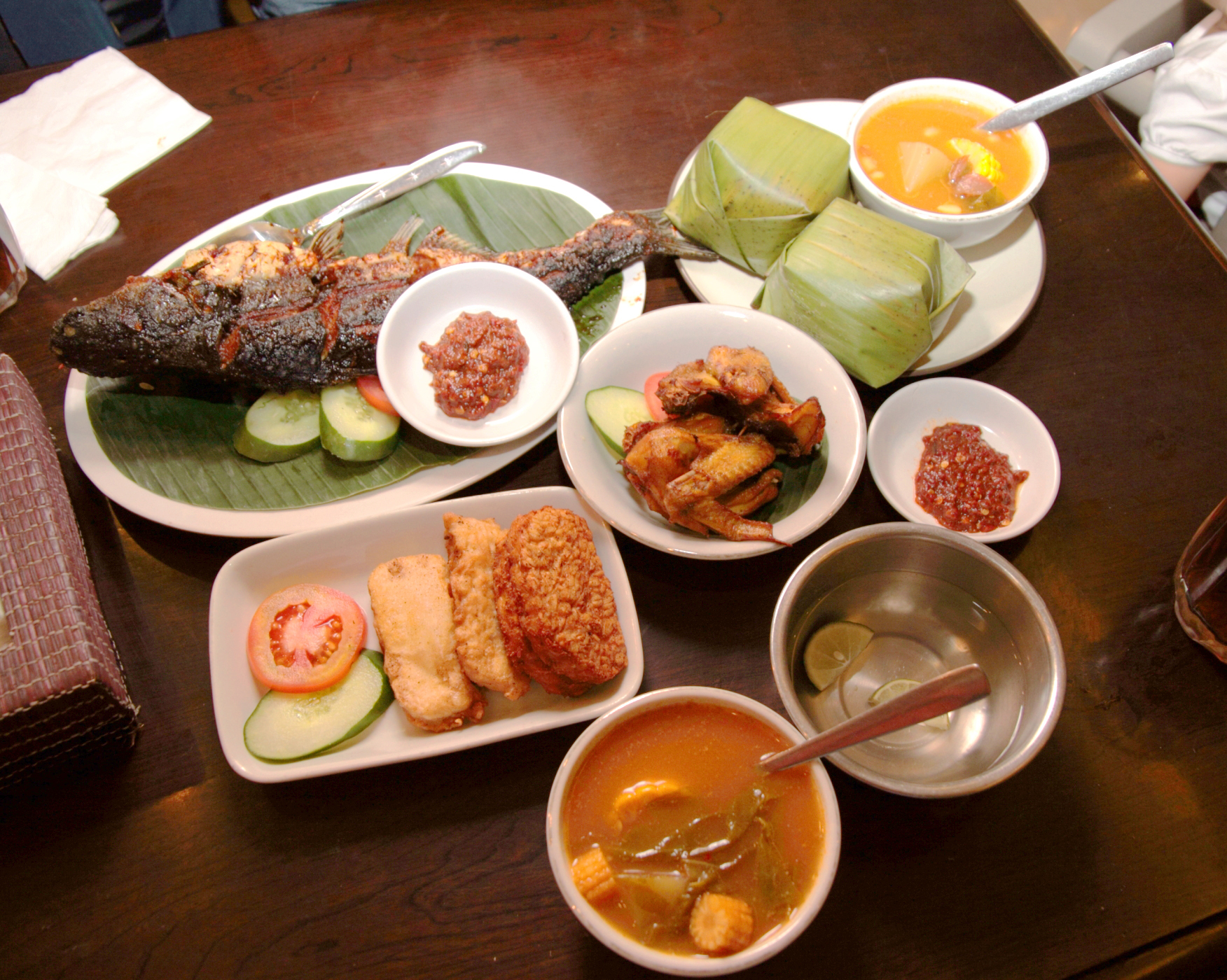
Indonesian Sundanese meal; ikan bakar (grilled fish), nasi timbel (rice wrapped in banana leaf), ayam goreng (fried chicken), sambal (chili sauce), tempeh goreng (fried tempeh), tahu goreng (fried tofu), and sayur asem (sour vegetable soup); the bowl of water with lime is for hand washing and called a kobokan.

Sundanese cuisine (Indonesian: Hidangan Sunda; Sundanese: ᮃᮞᮊᮔ᮪ ᮞᮥᮔ᮪ᮓ, romanized: Asakan Sunda) is the cuisine of the Sundanese people of Western Java and Banten, Indonesia. Sundanese food is characterised by its freshness; the well-known lalab eaten with sambal and also karedok demonstrate the Sundanese fondness for fresh raw vegetables. Unlike the rich and spicy taste, infused with coconut milk and curry, of Minangkabau cuisine, Sundanese cuisine has a simple and clear taste, ranging from savoury salty to fresh sourness to mild sweetness to hot and spicy.

Sambal terasi is the most important and the most common condiment in Sundanese cuisine, and is eaten together with lalab or fried tofu and tempeh. Sayur asem vegetable tamarind soup is a common vegetable soup in Sundanese cuisine. Common soups containing meat are soto Bandung, a soup of beef and daikon radish, and mie kocok noodle soup with beef meat and kikil.

== Ingredients ==
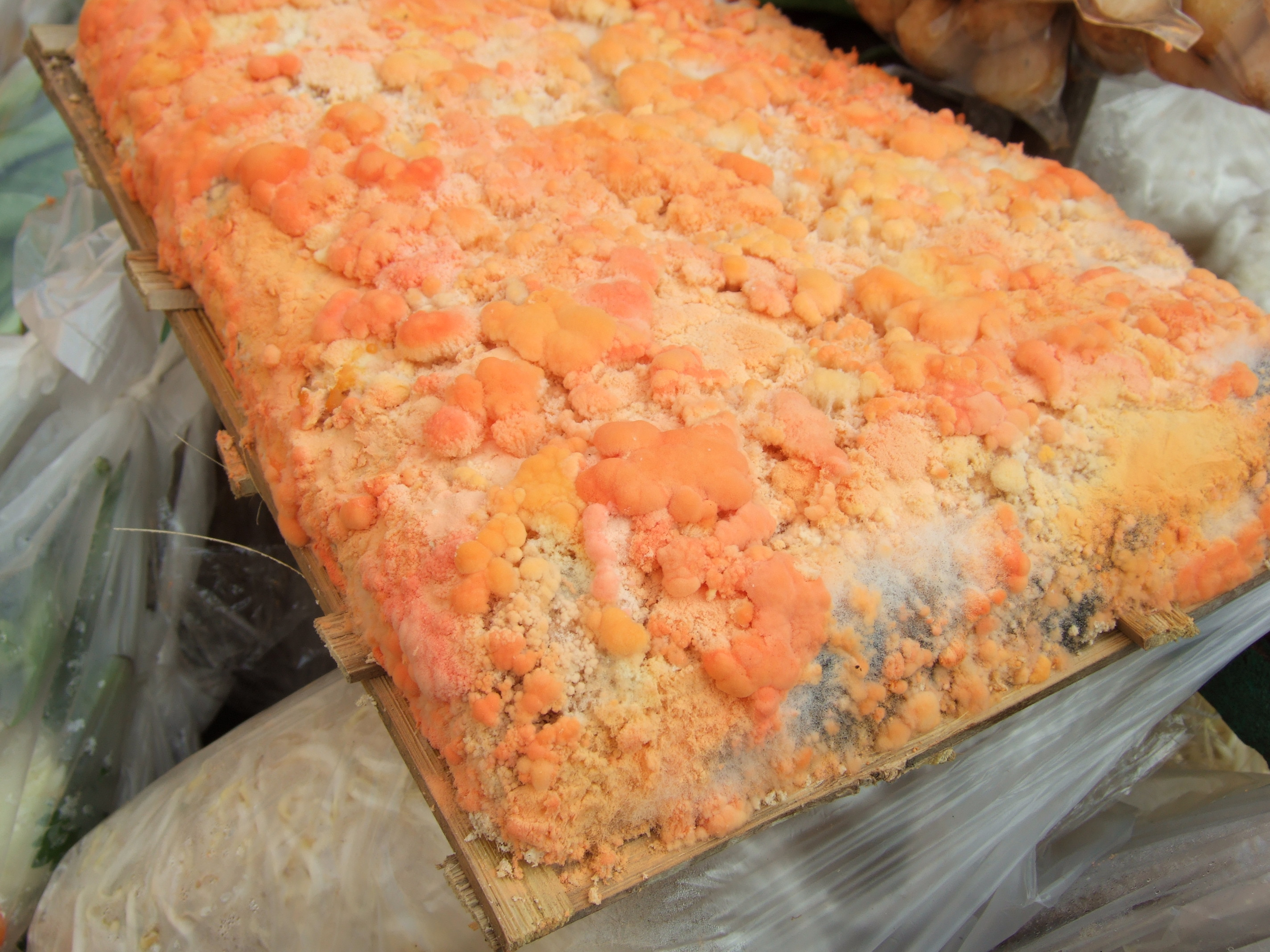
Oncom, a popular fermented ingredient in Sundanese cuisine

Fresh water fishes such as carp, gourami, tilapia and catfish are usually either being bakar (grilled) or goreng (deep fried) and usually served with sambal or sweet soy sauce. Sundanese people has developed fondness for salted seafoods. Various fried salted fishes, anchovy, and salted cuttlefish is popular in Sundanese daily diet. The pais or pepes cooking method that employs banana leaf as the wrapper of food is also common in Sundanese cuisine. Among other, pais lauk emas or carp fish pepes is among the favourite pepes dishes.

Chicken are usually either fried or grilled, also served with sambal or sweet soy sauce. Bakakak hayam is Sundanese style ayam bakar (grilled chicken). Sometimes chicken also can be made as pepes or soup. Meats such as beef, water buffalo, lamb, mutton, or goat can be marinated with the mixture of spices and coconut sugar and fried to make the empal gepuk sweet fried meat, sprinkled with fried shallots. Beef and potato sometimes are stewed in sweet soy sauce and spices as semur daging. Cow liver and jengkol stinky bean also can be made as semur as well. Goat, mutton, and lamb meat also can be made as satay in Sundanese style, such as sate maranggi. Gulai kambing (lamb curry), and empal gentong goat meat and offal curry is also popular soup.

If Javanese has developed their fondness for tempeh, Sundanese has developed the fondness for oncom instead, both are fermented products but with different kind of fungi and beans; tempeh is from soy beans while oncom is from peanuts. Sundanese has developed the fermentation method to create distinct foodstuffs. Fermentation was employed either for making fermented food such as oncom, making sauce such as tauco (adopted from Chinese Indonesian cuisine), or sweet snack foods such as peuyeum which are tapai made from rice or cassava.

== Sundanese restaurant ==
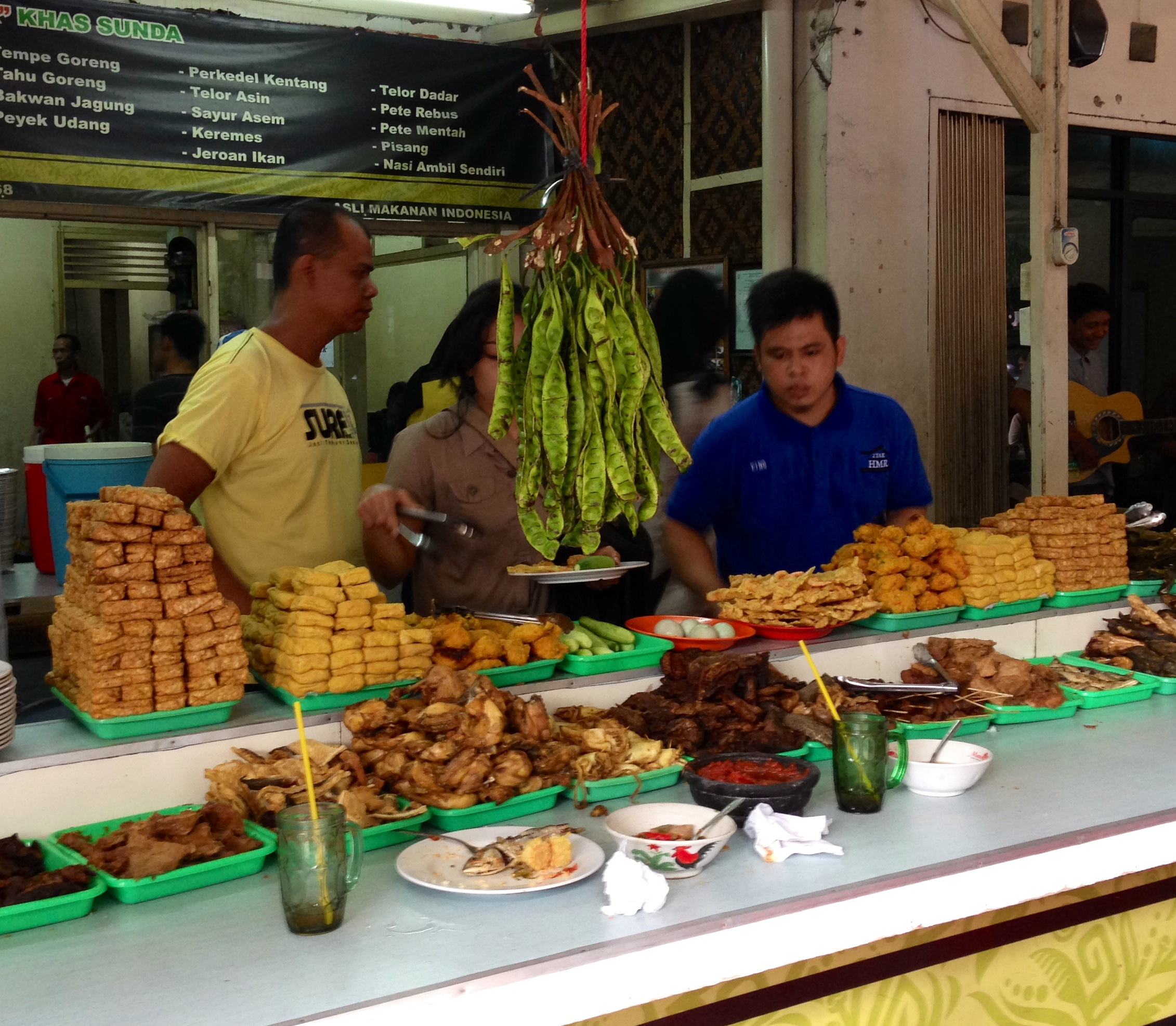
A Sundanese warung foodstall, displaying foods on table

In Sundanese cuisine establishments, it is common to eat with one's hands. They usually serve kobokan, a bowl of tap water with a slice of lime in it to give a fresh scent. This bowl are used to wash one's hands before and after eating.

Sundanese traditional restaurants may feature a traditional dining style called lesehan; where one eats on the floor, sitting on a straw or bamboo mat. The dishes may be served on a short legged table or served on the mat. This dining style is quite similar to the Japanese traditional tatami style. The Sundanese traditional restaurants in rural villages may also feature a saung style restaurant. Which features several small eating pavilions that might be built near or over fresh water fish ponds. The fish ponds typically contain live fresh water fish such as carp and gourami, that can be selected and ordered by customers to be freshly cooked.

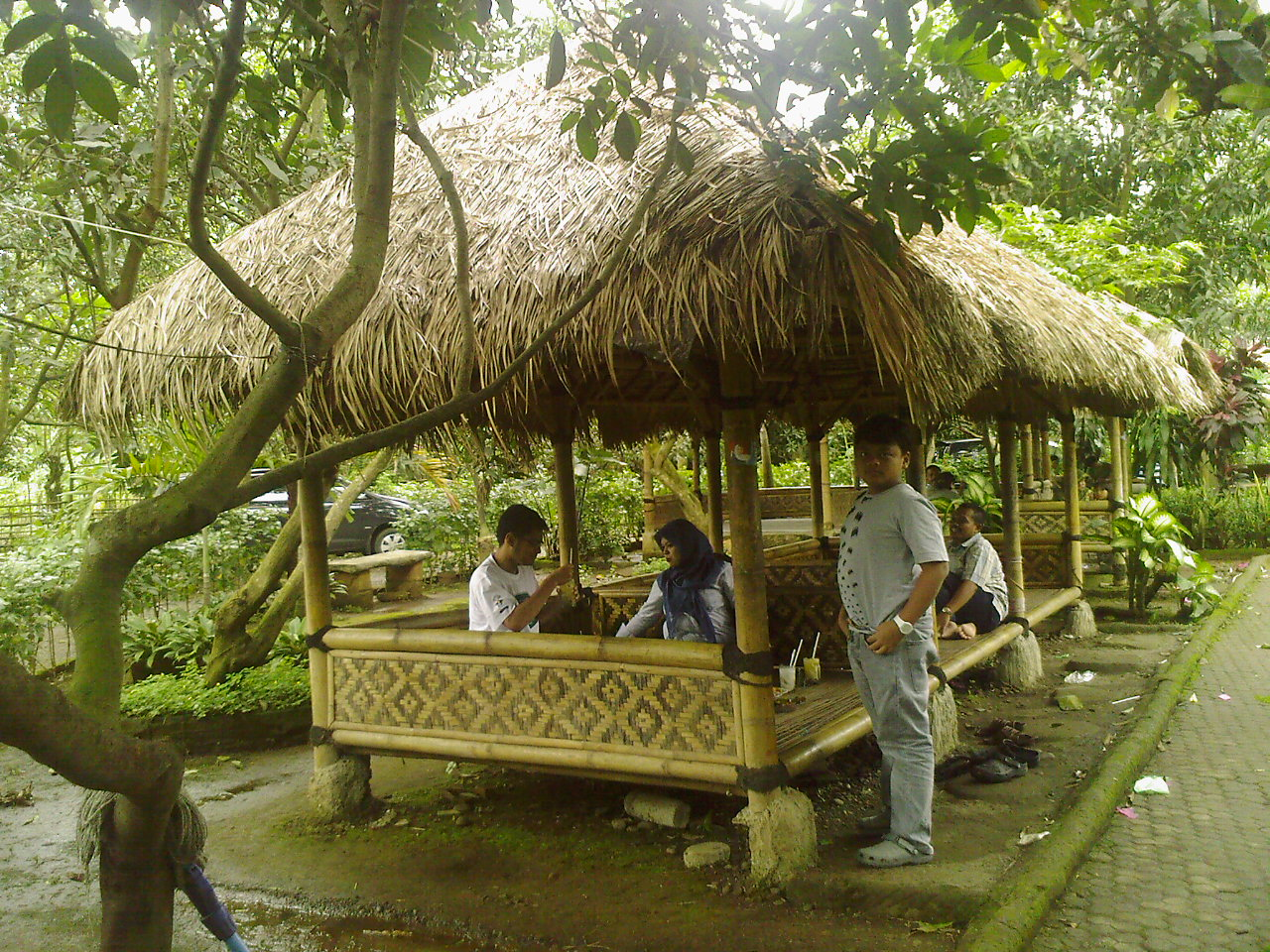
Sundanese saung bamboo pavilion restaurant.

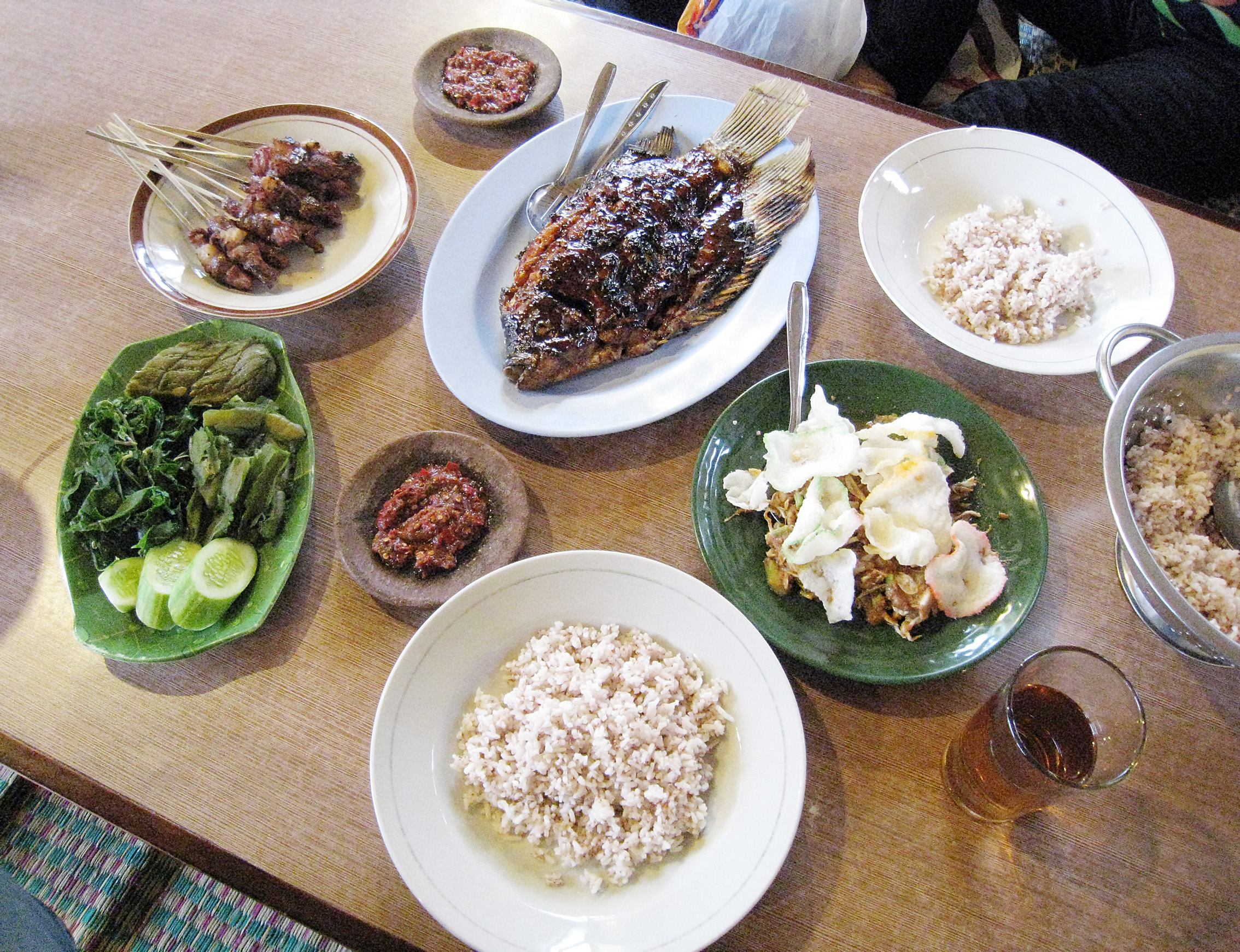
An example of Sundanese dishes in lesehan (seated on mat) style, which includes sate kambing (mutton satay), gurame bakar, karedok, steamed rice, lalab and sambal.

In popular Indonesian culture, Sundanese restaurants can often be easily distinguished by containing the name "Kuring", thus led to the terms "Kuring"-food or "Kuring"-restaurant. However this name is rather misleading, since in the Sundanese language the word Kuring is a common and colloquial, yet rather coarse form which refers to the first-person singular personal pronoun ("I" or "me"), and as the possessive adjective ("my"). This naming trend was led by restaurants that tried to imitate the famous Sundanese restaurant Lembur Kuring (Sundanese: "My Home Village"). Some examples of famous Sundanese restaurants are Ampera, Boboko, Bumbu Desa, Ciganea, Dapur Sunda, Laksana, Lembur Kuring, Mang Engking, Mang Kabayan, Ma' Uneh, Ponyo, Sari Kuring, Saung Kuring, Sindang Reret and Talaga Sampireun.

== Dishes ==
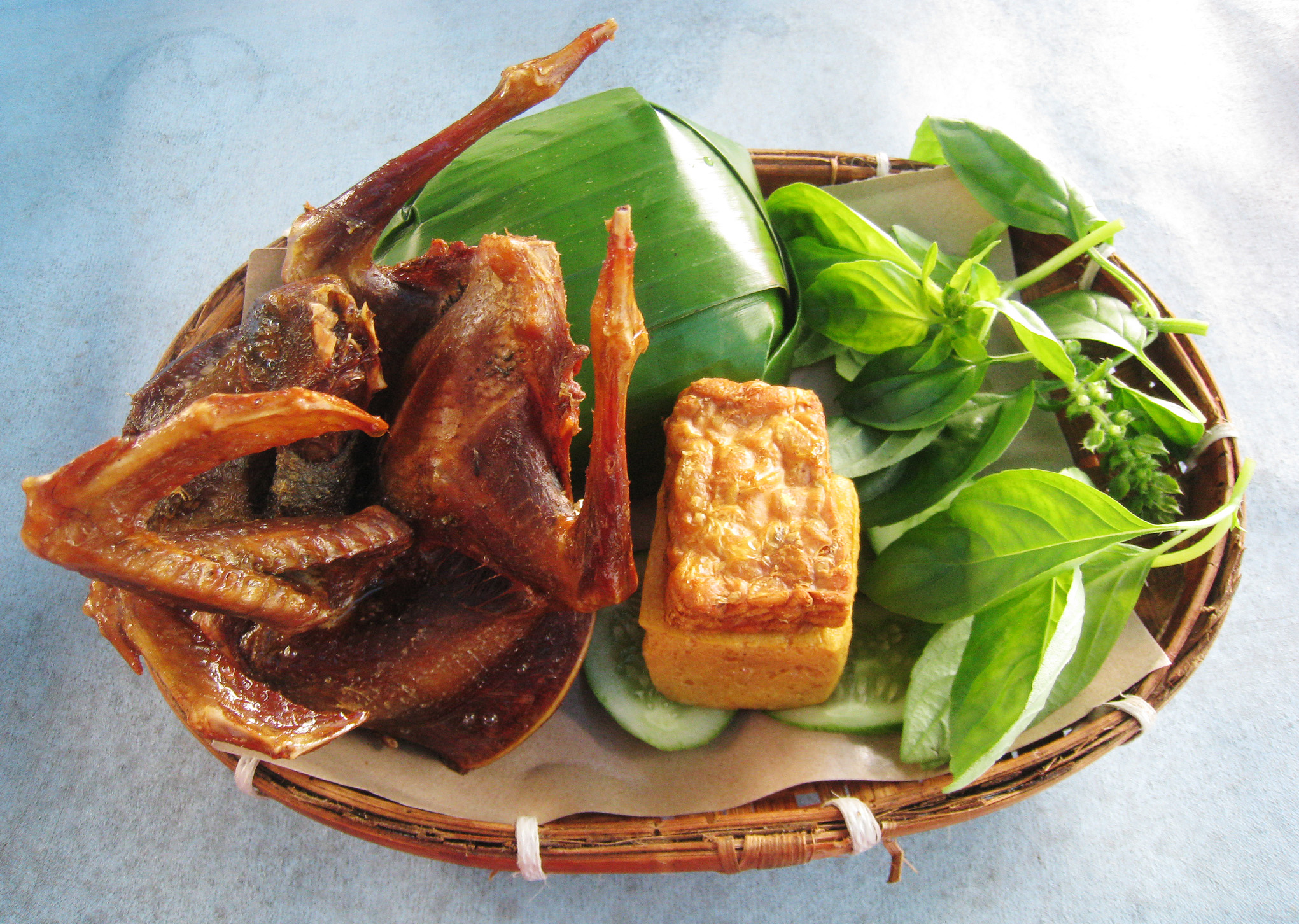
Nasi timbel dara goreng, nasi timbel with fried pigeon, tempeh, tofu and vegetables

- Nasi timbel, refers to the style of cooking where one wraps cooked hot steamed rice in a banana leaf. The heat of the hot-cooked rice contacts the banana leaf and produces a unique aroma. It is made in ways similar to that of making lontong; compressed, rolled, and wrapped in banana leaves; it then evolves into a complete dish served with various side-dishes like fried chicken, duck, pigeon, empal gepuk, jambal roti, tahu, tempeh, sayur asem, or with lalab and sambal. Nasi timbel later evolved to nasi bakar.
- Nasi liwet Sunda, a "one pot" dish consisting of rice, and seasoned with spices like galangal, lemon grass, and Indonesian bay leaves. To further enhance the flavour, usually parts of a salted fish added as well.
- Nasi tutug oncom, or hot steamed rice is usually mixed with roasted oncom, shallots, and kencur, and is typically served with krupuk, sambal terasi, and anchovy.

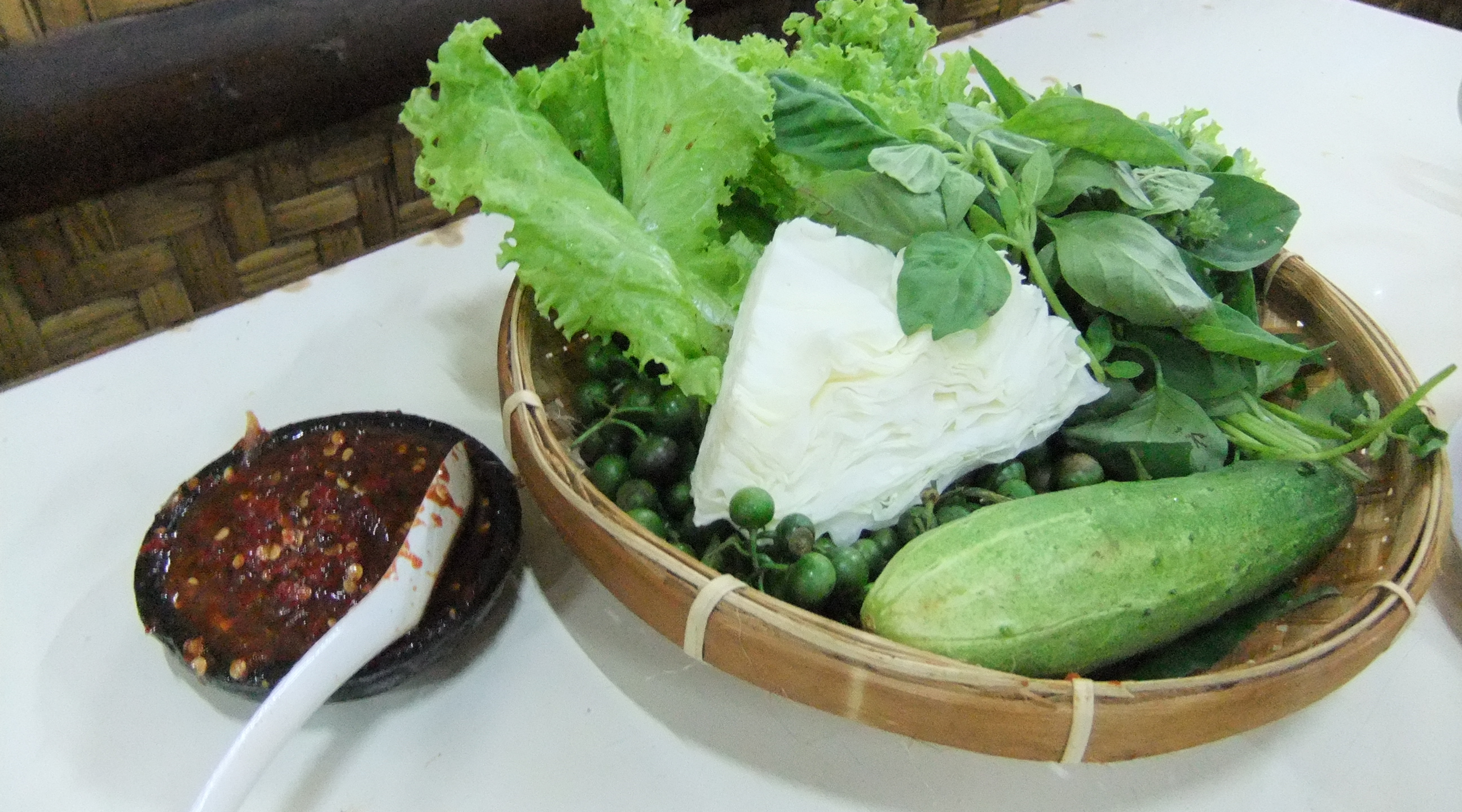
Lalab, raw vegetables with sambal

- Lalab: raw vegetable salad usually eaten with sambal
- Sambal terasi: mortar ground chillies with shrimp paste
- Karedok: raw vegetable salad in peanut sauce
- Lotek: boiled vegetable salad in peanut sauce

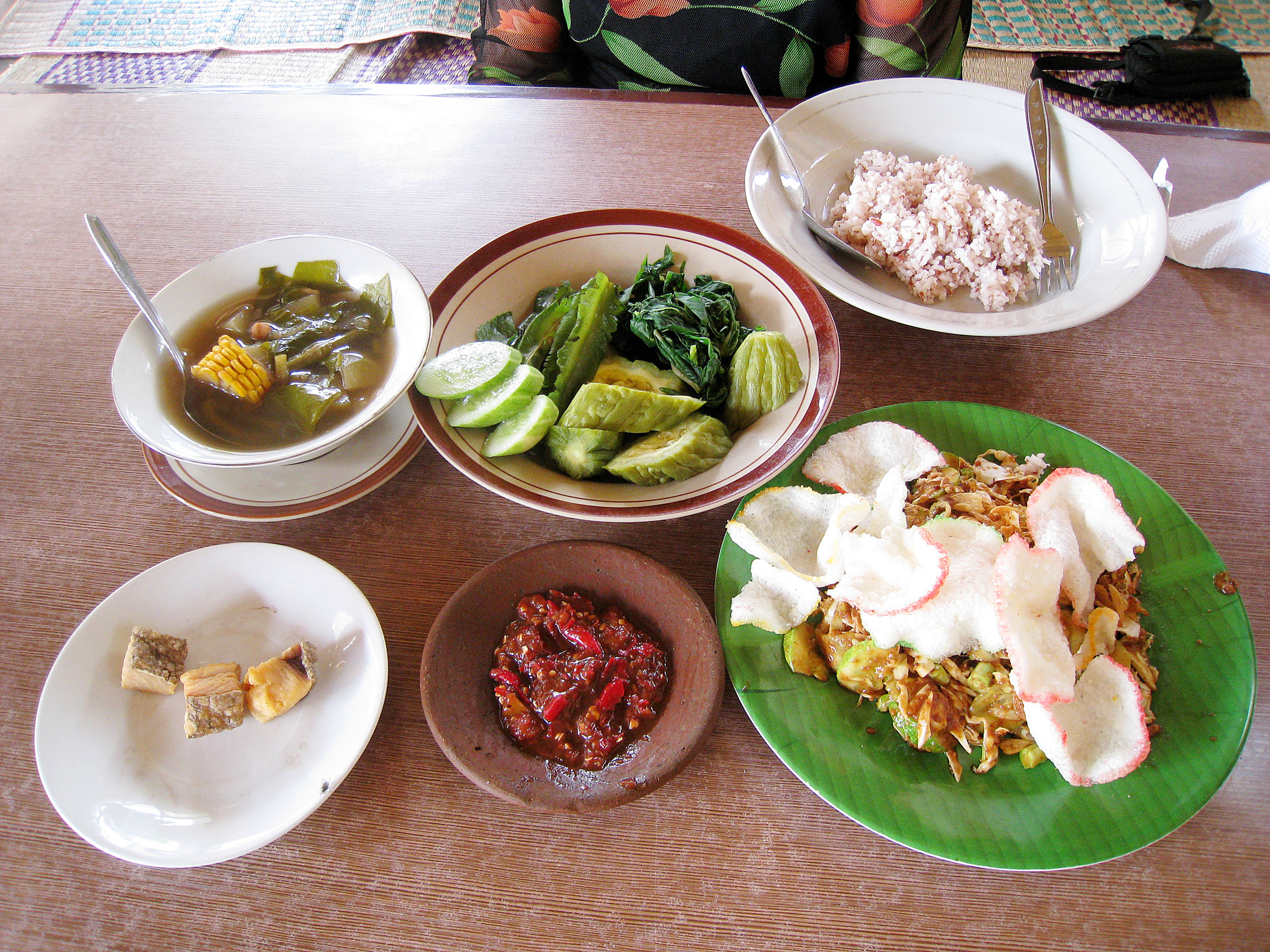
Sayur asem, lalab, red rice, ikan asin, sambal, and karedok

- Sayur Asem: sour tamarind vegetable soup.
- Oncom: a type of fermented food similar to tempeh. Oncom can be fried, made into "pepes" or stir fried with vegetables such as Ulukutek Leunca (Solanum nigrum) or Oncom Peuteuy (green stink bean).
- Tumis Tauco: vegetables stir fried with fermented soybean paste sauce. Tauco is similar to Japanese miso paste.
- Tumis Kangkung: stir fried water spinach
- Various Pepes: pepes refers to a cooking method which employs a banana leaf wrapper. Various ingredients could be made into pepes, such as carp, anchovy, tofu, oncom, leunca, mushroom, salted egg, etc. The most famous recipe is Pais Lauk Emas (carp fish pepes).
- Various Ikan bakar: literally means "grilled fish", served with a sweet soy sauce and chilli dipping sauce. The fish could be carp, gourami, tilapia, or catfish.

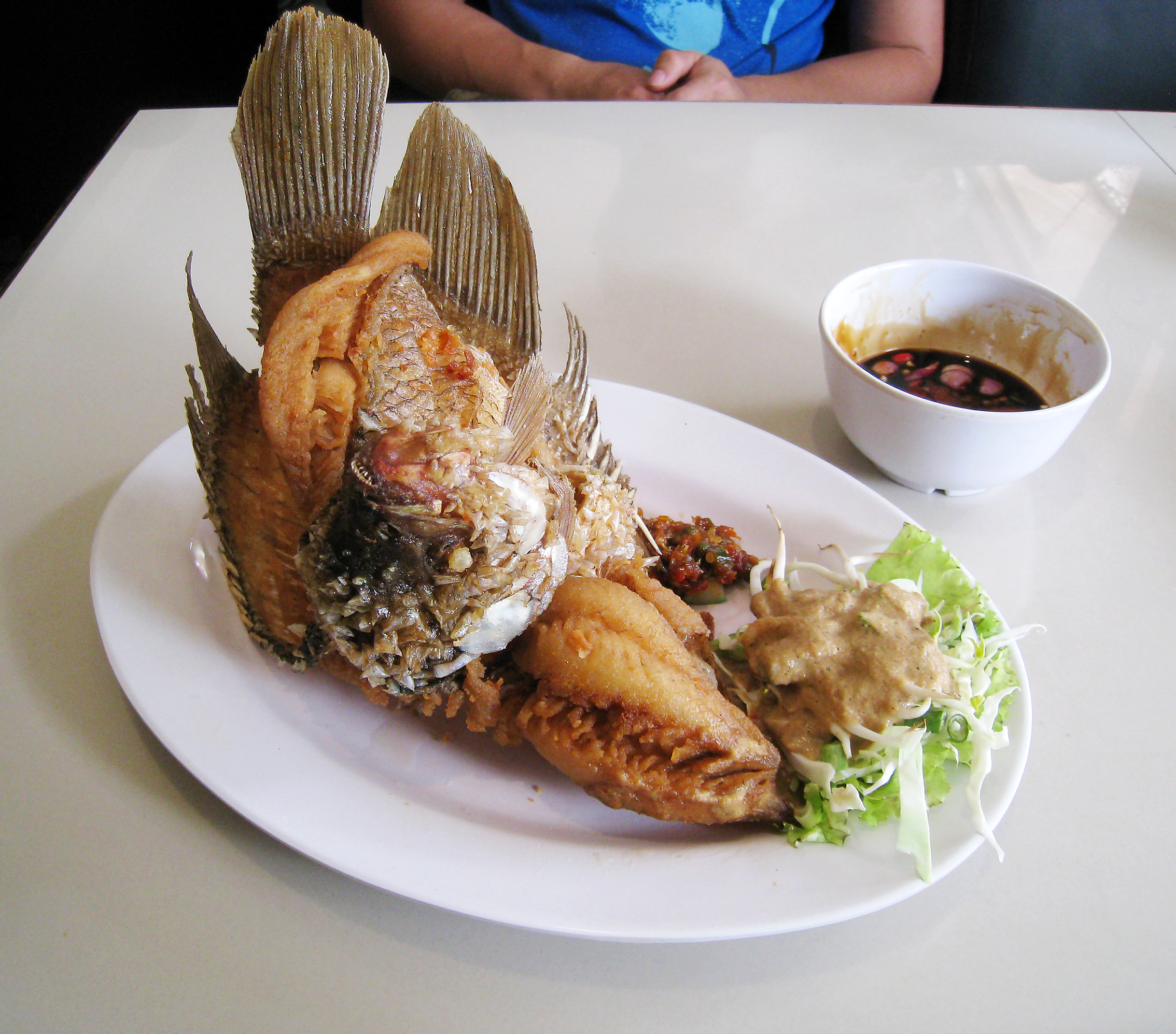
Gurame goreng kipas

- Various Ikan goreng: literally means "fried fish". It is served with sweet soy sauce and chilli dipping sauce. The fish could be carp, gourami, tilapia, or catfish. The famous recipe is Gurame goreng kipas, which is deep fried gourami with flesh spread like a fan.
- Various Ikan Asin, or salted fishes, which are mostly seafood dishes such as peda, jambal, pari (rays), ikan asin bulu ayam, teri (anchovy), and cumi asin (cuttlefish); also fresh water gabus (snakehead).
- Bakakak hayam: A Sundanese-style grilled chicken
- Soto Bandung: a type of soto, beef and daikon soup
- Soto mie: a type of soto with rice vermicelli, spring roll and beef tendon
- Mie kocok: a type of noodle dish with beef meat and kikil
- Sate Maranggi: a Sundanese style marinated satay usually using goat meat
- Gulai Kambing: goat or mutton meat and offal curry
- Empal gentong: a type of goat or mutton meat and offal curry from Cirebon
- Empal gepuk: sweet and spicy fried beef
- Laksa Bogor: a variant of laksa from Bogor
- Kupat tahu: ketupat, tofu, rice vermicelli and beansprouts in peanut sauce
- Asinan: a type of vinegar-fermented vegetable or fruit dish.
- Baso Tahu: an Indonesian style dimsum with peanut sauce, also known as Siomay Bandung
- Batagor: Baso Tahu Goreng, or fried bakso and tofu
- Seblak: stir fried wet krupuk with other ingredients

== Snacks ==
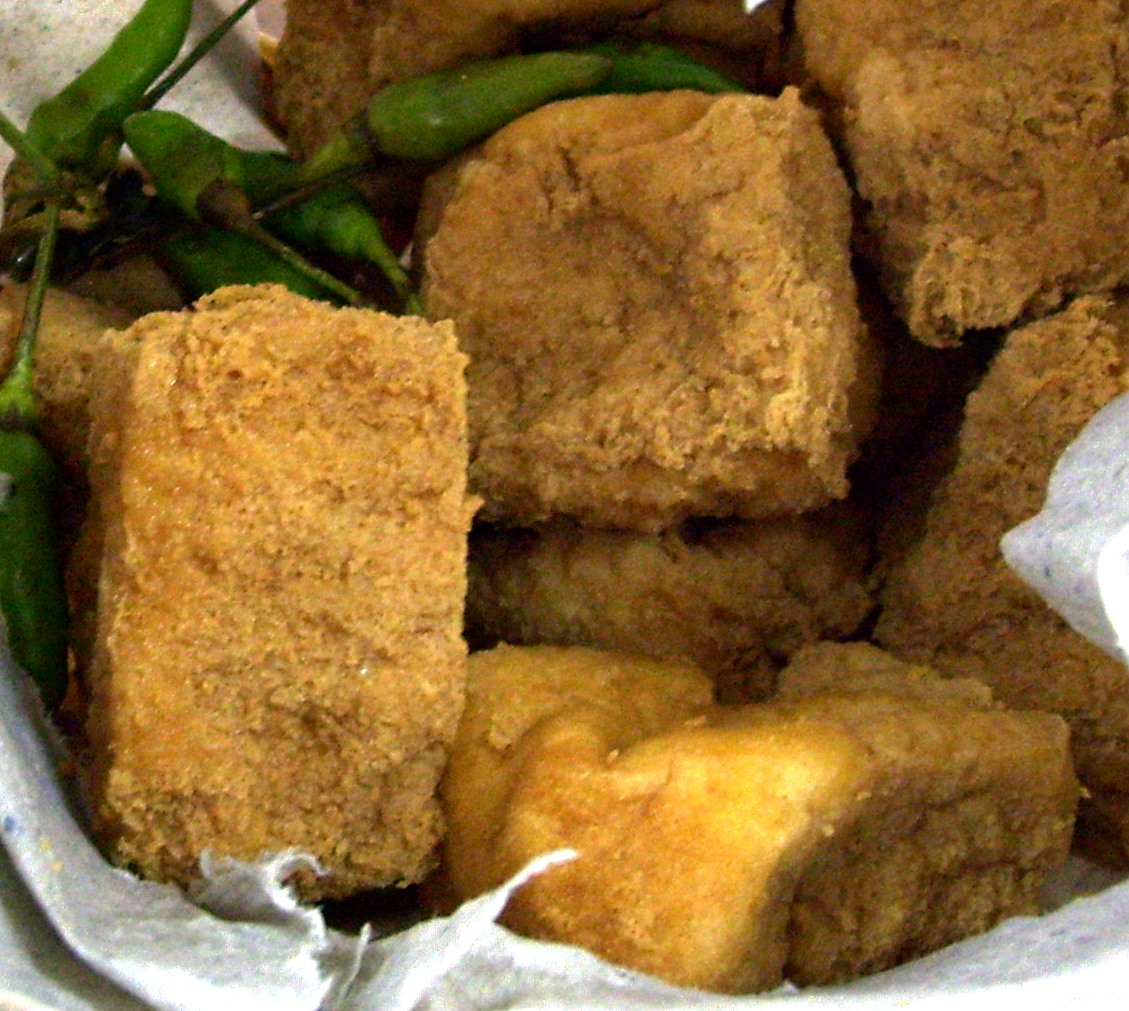
Tahu Sumedang

- Surabi: a traditional rice flour pancake in sweet coconut sugar syrup or topped with spicy oncom mixture
- Tahu Sumedang: a fried tofu snack
- Tahu gejrot: slightly fermented fried tofu snack with slices of shallots, chilli, and garlic in spicy-sweet sauce
- Bala-bala: a fried dough snack made from various chopped vegetables
- Cireng: fried dough snack made from sago or cassava flour. The name comes from "Aci goreng" (Sundanese: "fried sago flour".)
- Cilok: flavoured sago balls which are skewered. The name comes from "Aci dicolok" (Sundanese: "poked sago balls".)
- Cimol: sago balls snack
- Colenak: roasted cassava with sweet coconut dipping sauce. The name comes from "Dicocol enak" (Sundanese: "delicious dip.")
- Leupeut: compacted rice with or without filling, typically wrapped in young coconut leaf
- Peuyeum sampeu: a sweet fermented cassava snack
- Peuyeum ketan: a sweet fermented sticky rice wrapped in guava leaf
- Comro: fried dough made of finely shredded cassava with spicy oncom filling. The name comes from "Oncom di jero" (Sundanese: "oncom inside".)
- Misro: same fried dough as comro, but instead filled with melted palm sugar. The name comes from "Amis di jero" (Sundanese: "sweet inside".)
- Odading: fried sweet bread, some variation filled with banana
- Dodol Garut: sweets made from sticky rice powder and palm sugar, with added milk, or sesame seed
- Kolontong: roasted cylindrical shaped rice crackers with either cane sugar or palm sugar coating
- Opak: roasted disc shaped rice crackers
- Ranginang: fried rice grain crackers seasoned with terasi
- Kalua: dried fruit marinated in sugar
- Ladu: sweets made from part of fine sticky rice powder and part coarse roasted sticky rice grains, mixed with palm sugar then compacted; usually it has triangular cut.

== Drinks ==
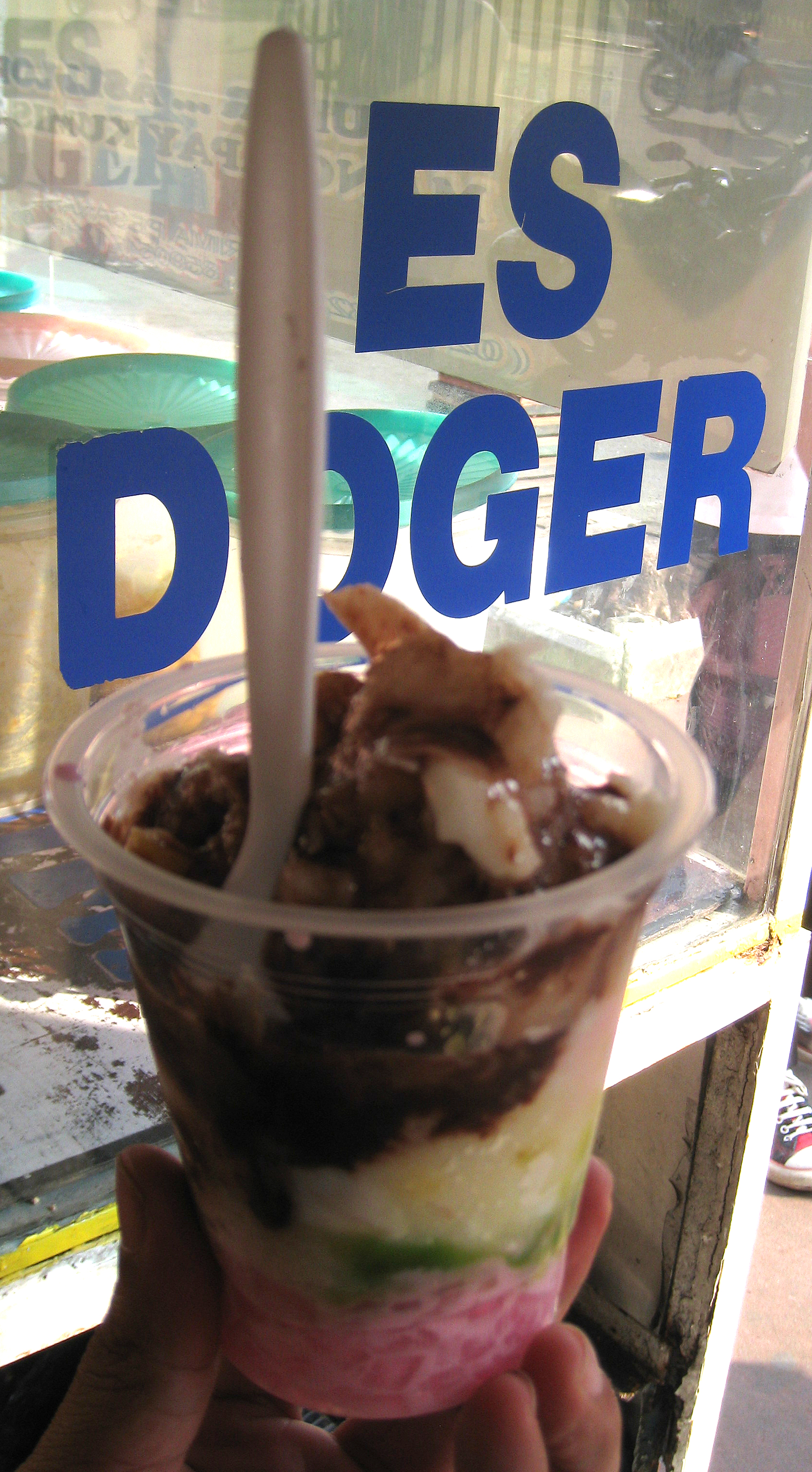
Es doger

- Bajigur: a traditional hot drink made from coconut milk, spices, pandan leaf, and coconut sugar
- Bandrek: a traditional hot drink made from ginger, spices, and coconut sugar
- Cendol: a traditional cold drink made from coconut sugar, coconut milk, and green glutinous rice jelly
- Es Doger: ice cream-like dessert made from coconut flesh, coconut milk, peuyeum (sweet fermented cassava) and pink syrup (rose or cocopandan)
- Es Goyobod: the Sundanese version of es campur; mixed jelly and mashed avocado drink in heavy coconut milk and jackfruit-infused brown sugar syrup.
- Es Duren: ice cream-like dessert made from durian and milk
- Lahang: a traditional sweet and cold beverage made from the sap of Arenga pinnata (aren).

== See also ==
- Indonesian cuisine
- Javanese cuisine
- Malay cuisine
- Minangkabau cuisine
- Balinese cuisine
