= Lalab =

Indonesian raw vegetable salad

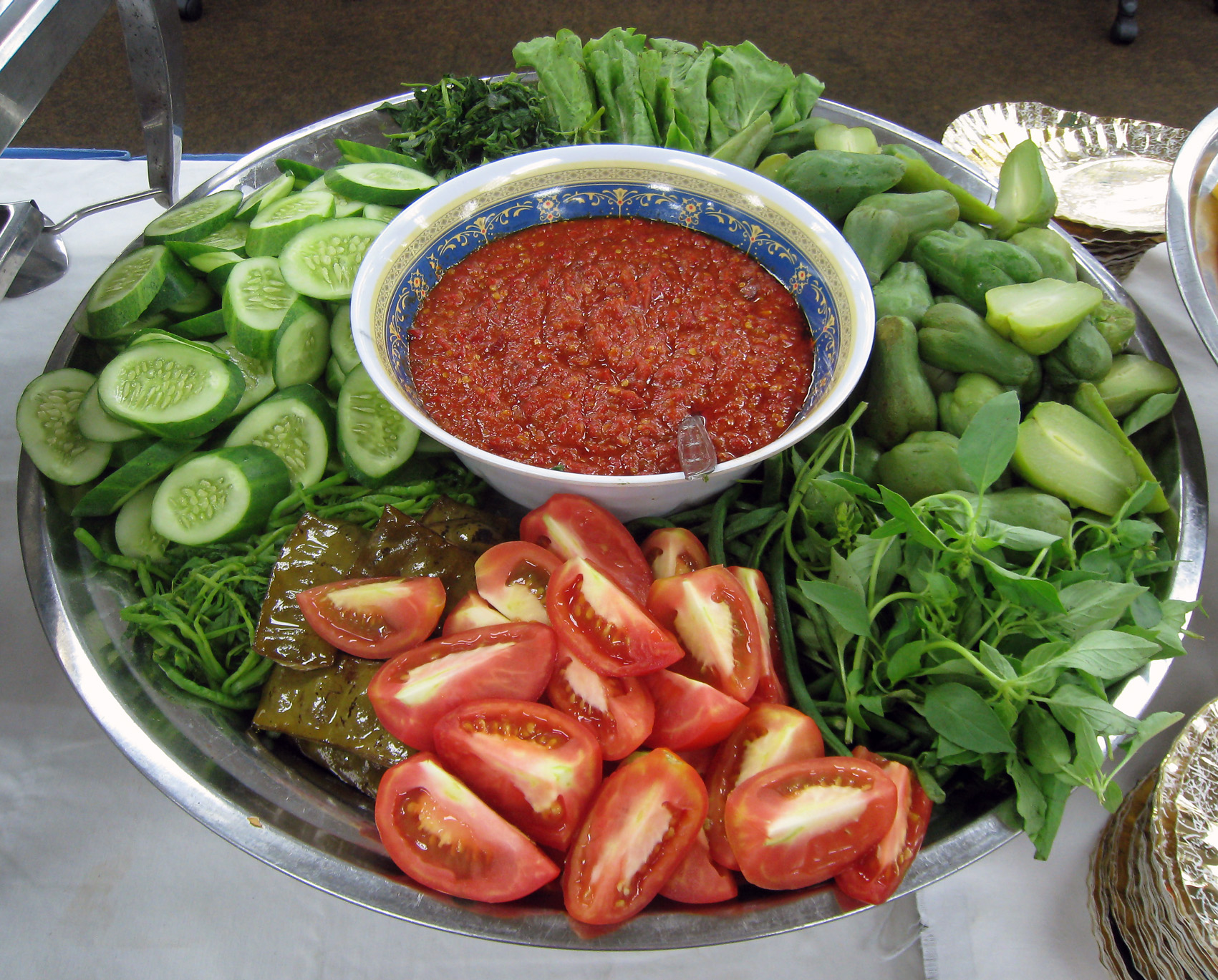
- Lalab platter with sambal
- Alternative names: Lalap
- Type: Salad
- Course: Iced tea, Ayam Goreng (Fried chicken)
- Region or state: West Java
- Associated cuisine: Indonesia
- Created by: Sundanese people
- Serving temperature: Cold or room temperature
- Main ingredients: Various raw vegetables served with sambal terasi
- Similar dishes: Ngapi yay, Nam phrik, Ulam

Lalab (Sundanese: ᮜᮜᮘ᮪; Indonesian: lalap/lalapan) is a Sundanese raw vegetable salad served with sambal terasi popular and originated in West and Banten regions of Java, Indonesia.

Any edible vegetables can be made into lalab. However, the most common raw vegetables are cucumber, tomato, cabbage, lettuce, lemon basil, leunca, and long beans. While the blanched or boiled vegetables may include amaranth, papaya leaves, and chayote. The dressing for this salad is usually sambal terasi, served directly from the stone mortar as a spicy dipping sauce for these assorted raw vegetables.

Today, lalab is popular throughout Indonesia. It is usually served as a vegetable side dish next to the main course, such as ayam goreng (fried chicken), ayam bakar (grilled chicken), pepes, pecel lele (fried catfish), fried gourami, and many other ikan goreng (fried fish) or ikan bakar (grilled fish).

== History ==
The history of lalab vegetables is obscure, due to lack of historical records. In the 15th century Old Sundanese manuscript Sanghyang Siksa Kandang Karesian it was mentioned the common flavours of food at that times were, lawana (salty), kaduka (hot and spicy), tritka (bitter), amba (sour), kasaya (succulent), and madura (sweet). These tastes are native flavours which mostly acquired from plants and vegetables.

== Ingredients ==
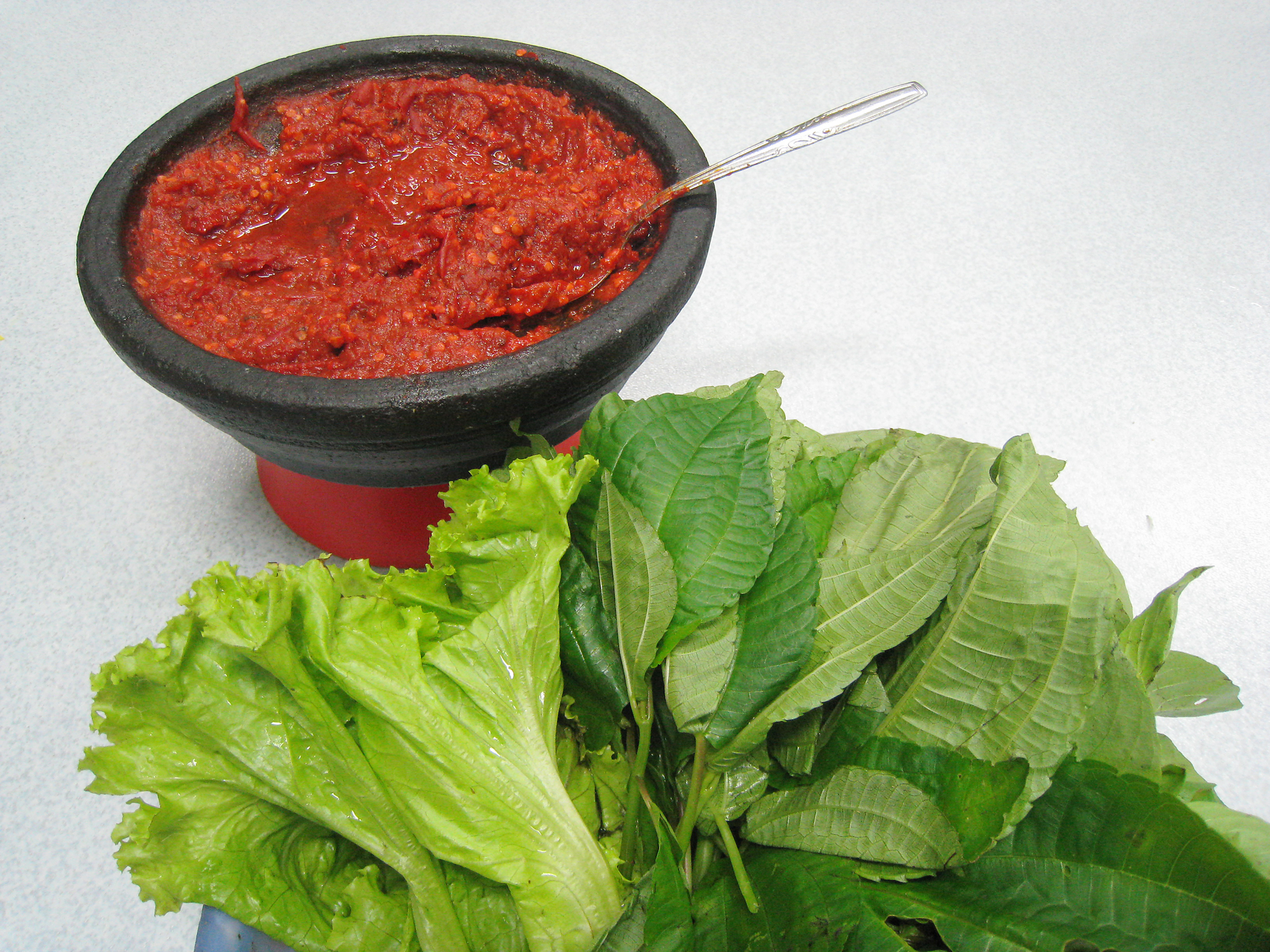
A bowl of sambal chili paste aside of lettuce and pohpohan (Pilea melastomoides) lalab.

Originally, it was made from any available edible young leaves and raw vegetables known by Sundanese since ancient times. Today, though, most lalab consists of sliced cabbage, cucumbers, lettuce, green beans, yardlong beans, tomatoes, leunca, lemon basil, amaranth, water spinach, pohpohan leaves (Pilea melastomoides), small, green eggplant. Introduced American plants like kenikir (cosmos), cassava, papaya, and chayote, have also integrated into lalab repertoire. Sometimes, other exotic vegetables also are used, such as green, stinky petai, and jengkol beans.

Although most lalab vegetables are only washed in cold water and served raw, some boiled, steamed, and fried variations are also available; for example, petai beans can be served either raw or fried, while chayote, water spinach, and cassava leaves are usually served boiled.

While most vegetables are served raw or simply boiled or blanched, the main flavouring agent is its dressing, the hot and spicy sambal terasi cooked by a mix of chili paste in terasi (shrimp paste). Most of recipes revolved around specific recipe of sambals.

== Nutrients ==
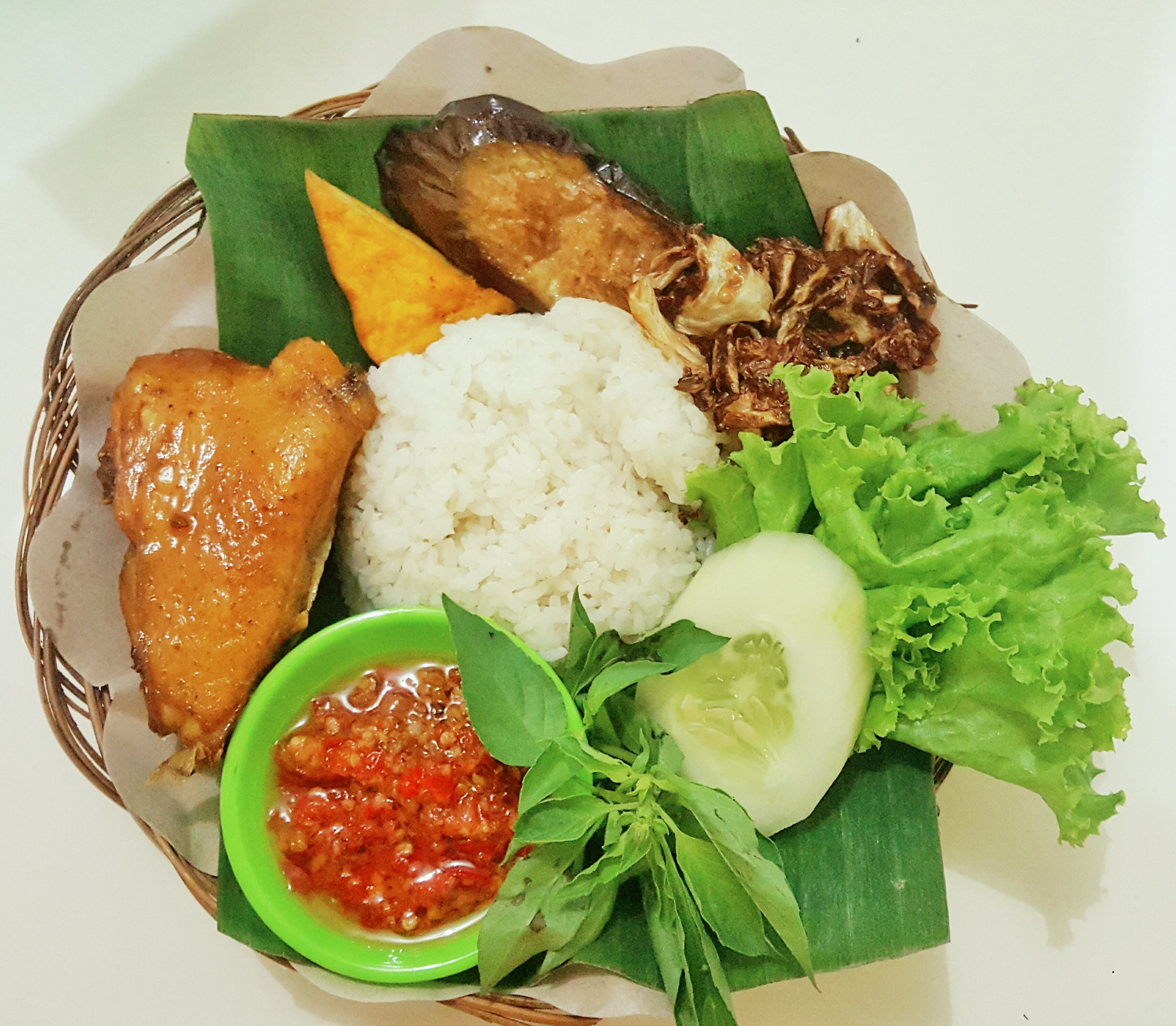
Lalab of cucumber, lettuce and lemon basil, with fried eggplant, cabbage, tofu and sambal, as part of ayam goreng meal.

In Sundanese cuisine, lalab often served as garnishing or as vegetable accompaniment to the main meal of fish or chicken; such as ayam goreng (fried chicken) or pecel lele (fried catfish). Lalab is rich in vitamins, minerals and fiber. Daily consumption of fresh vegetables is good for reducing cholesterol levels and improving digestive health. Vegetables are also rich in antioxidants, which contribute to fighting free radicals, and have antiaging and anticancer properties. Several plants used in lalab also are believed to have certain medicinal properties.

== See also ==
- Ulam, similar Malay dish consists of vegetables, served raw or blanched in hot water
- List of salads
- Ngapi yay, a similar dish in Burmese cuisine
- Nam phrik, a similar dish in Thai cuisine
