= Bakakak hayam =

Traditional Sundanese chicken dish

Bakakak
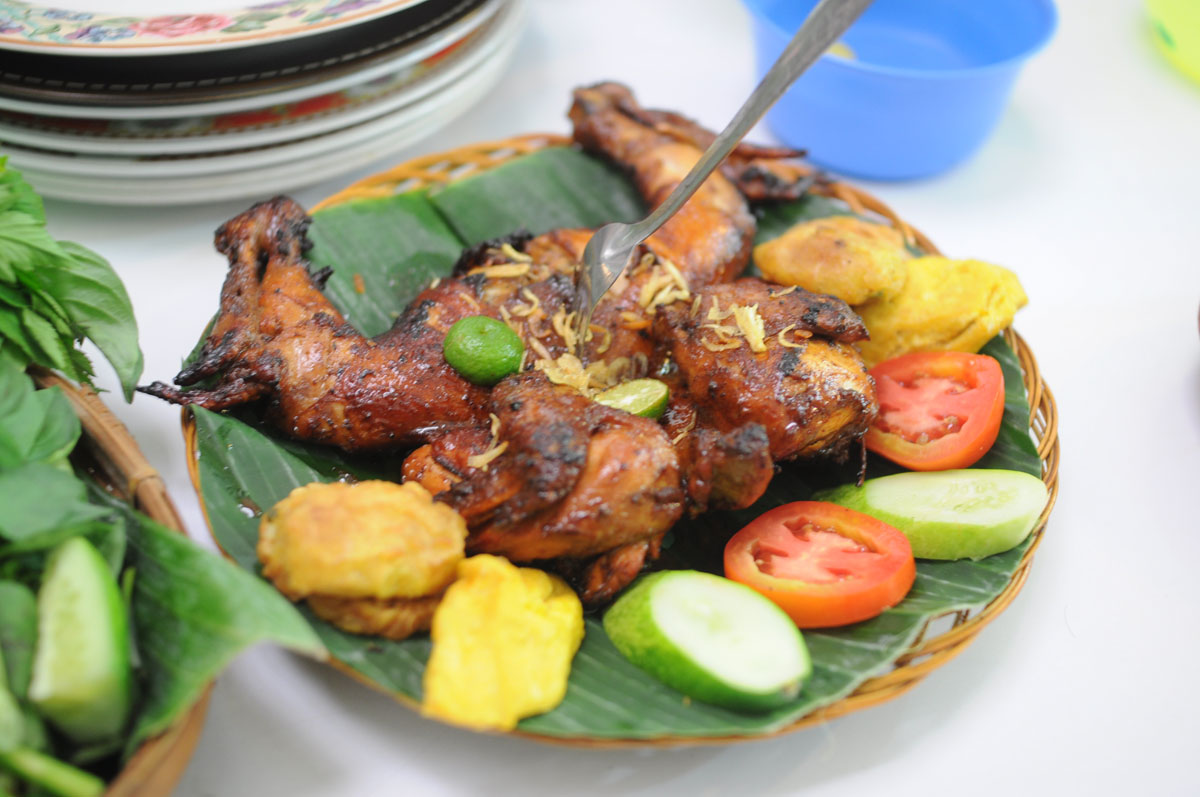
- Bakakak hayam
- Alternative names: Ayam Bekakak
- Course: Main course, wedding party, khitan party
- Place of origin: Indonesia
- Region or state: West Java and Nationwide
- Serving temperature: Hot or room temperature
- Main ingredients: Roasted chicken in spices

Bakakak hayam or Ayam Bekakak (Ayam Bekakak, Bakakak chicken or Splayed chicken) is a traditional Sundanese cuisine, originating from the Indonesia. The form of chicken roasted above fire, after it is cleaned and added with special seasonings. Usually a chef uses a bamboo stick to grab a chicken to make it easy to grill. This dish will usually be served during a Sundanese wedding procession.

This traditional dish can be found during Weddings, circumcision parties, but now it is found in many Sundanese restaurant places.

== See also ==
- Cuisine of Indonesia
- Betutu (Bali and Lombok)
- List of duck dishes
