= Ikan bakar =

Indonesian and Malay grilled fish

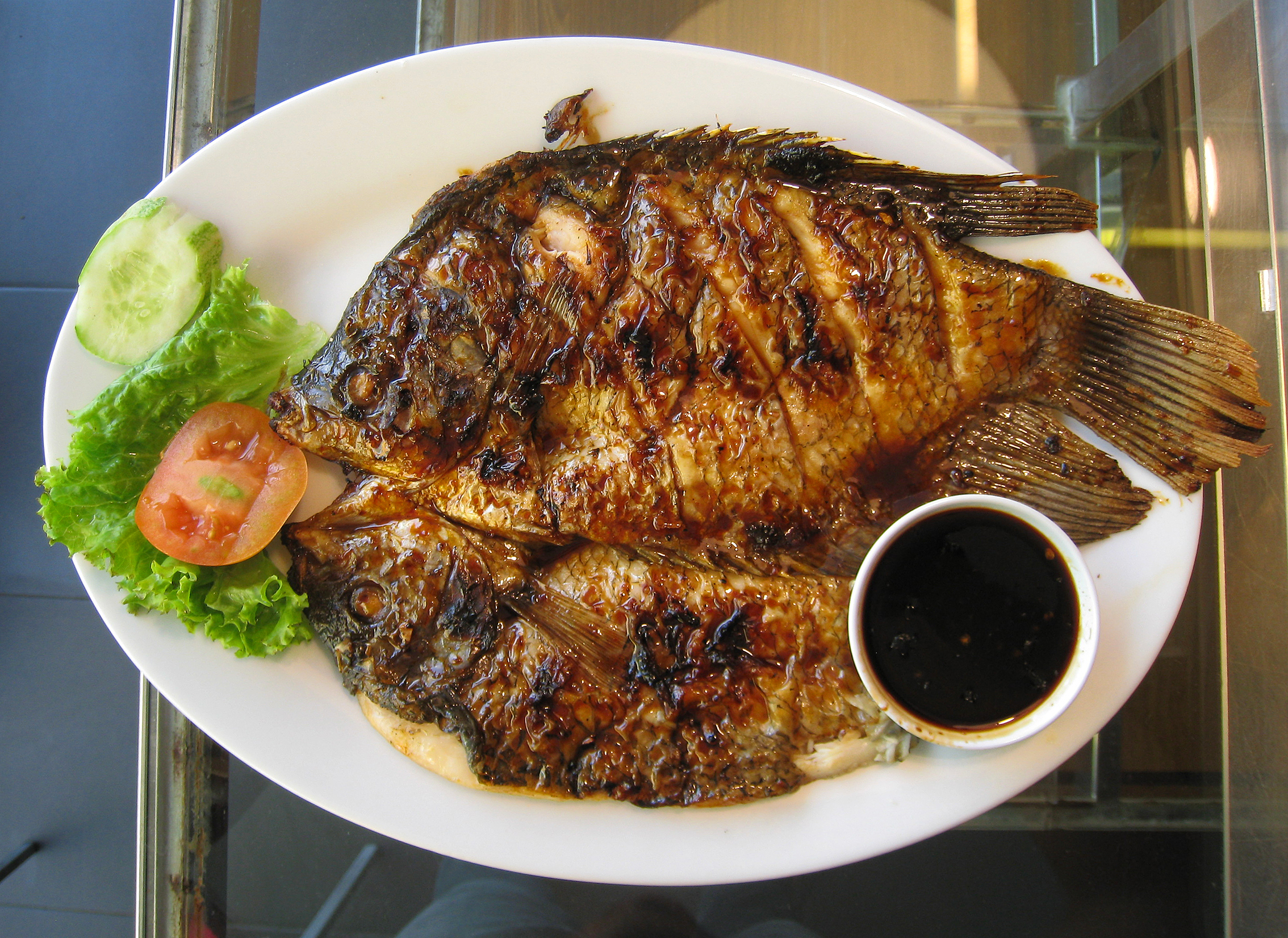
- Ikan gurame bakar, grilled gourami served with sweet soy sauce, served in Jakarta
- Alternative names: Grilled fish
- Course: Main course
- Associated cuisine: Indonesia, Brunei, Malaysia, Singapore
- Serving temperature: Hot
- Main ingredients: Fish, seasoned with garlic, shallots and other spices grilled on charcoal

Ikan bakar is a Malay dish, prepared with charcoal-grilled fish or other forms of seafood. Ikan bakar literally means "grilled fish" in the Malay and Indonesian languages. Ikan bakar differs from other grilled fish dishes in that it often contains flavorings like bumbu, kecap manis, and sambal, and is covered in a banana leaf and cooked on a charcoal fire.

In 2024, TasteAtlas ranked ikan bakar as one of the best seafood dishes in the world.

== Origin and popularity ==
Grilling is one of the oldest and earliest cooking methods to prepare fish. Freshwater fish and seafood are among the main source of protein intake for the inhabitants of islands. Naturally, this method is immensely popular and quite widespread in the maritime realm of the Indonesian archipelago. Thus the grilled-barbecued fish is regarded as a classic dish of Indonesian cuisine.

As an archipelagic nation, ikan bakar is very popular in Indonesia and is commonly found in many places, from an Acehnese beach to a restaurant perched over Kupang's harbour in East Nusa Tenggara, to the center of Jakarta's business district. Various specific versions exist, including Sundanese ikan bakar Cianjur, which is usually grilled freshwater fish, such as carp and gourami, and Balinese ikan bakar Jimbaran, freshly grilled seafood fish in warung clustered near Jimbaran beach and fish market in Bali. Barbecued seafood, however, is especially popular in Sulawesi and Maluku, where most of the people work as fishermen, and both areas have vast seas which bring them different kinds of seafood. Usually, the fish is marinated with a mixture of spice pastes, sometimes with belacan or kecap manis (sweet soy sauce), and then grilled, sometimes protected with a sheet of banana leaf placed between the seafood and grill to avoid the fish being stuck to the grill and broken to pieces.

== Marination and spices ==
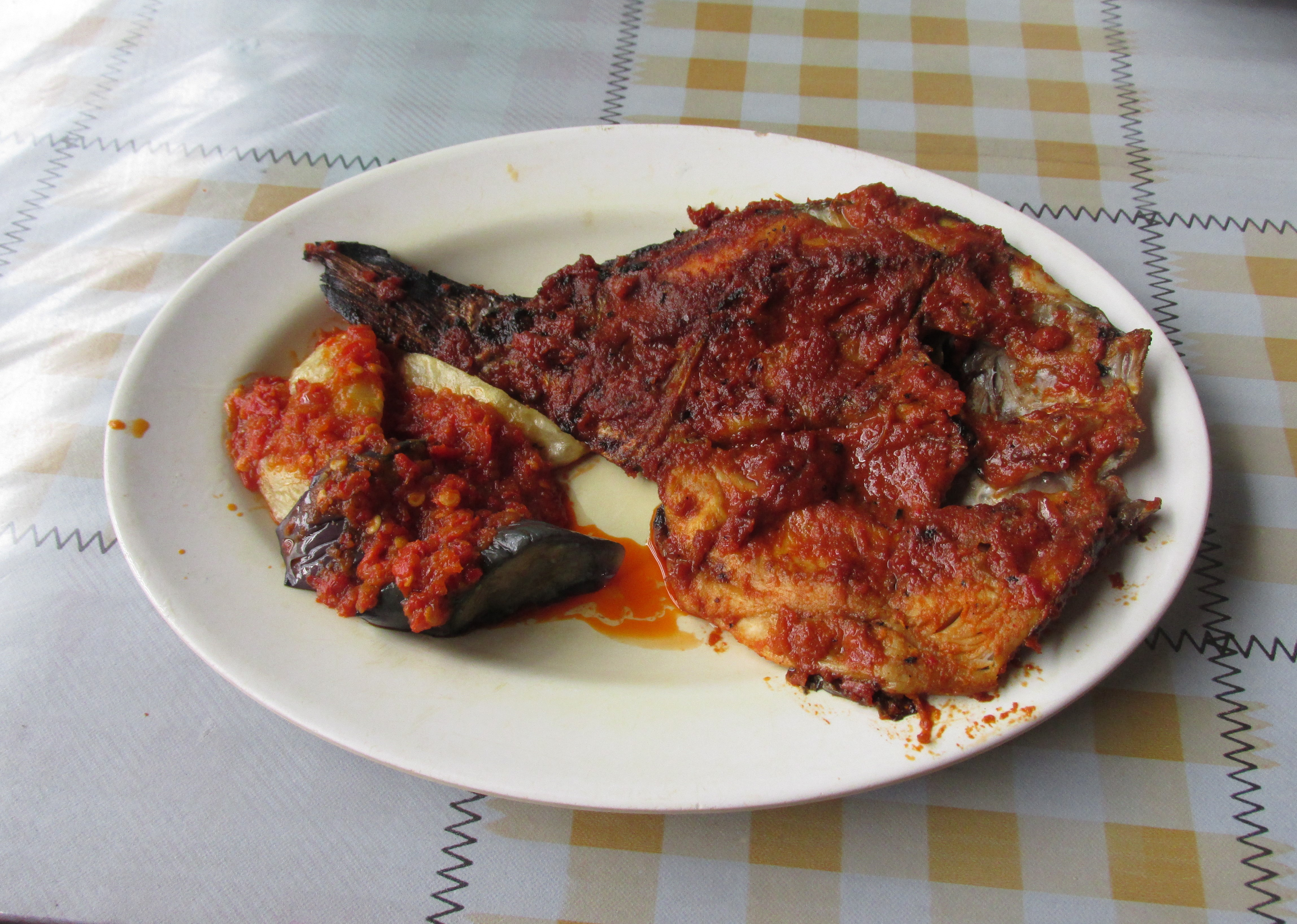
Padang style ikan bakar served in rich spices with reddish color.

The fish is usually marinated with a mixture of sweet soy sauce and coconut oil or margarine, applied with a brush during grilling. The spice mixture may vary among regions and places, but usually it consists of a combination of ground shallot, garlic, chili pepper, coriander, tamarind juice, candlenut, turmeric, galangal and salt. In Java and most of Indonesia, ikan bakar usually tastes rather sweet because the generous amount of sweet soy sauce either as marination or dipping sauce. It is commonly consumed with steamed rice and the sweet sticky soy sauce poured over finely chopped green chilies and shallots. The ikan bakar of Minangkabau (Padang), most of Sumatra and also Malay Peninsula are usually spicier and yellow-reddish in colour because of the generous amount of chili pepper, turmeric and other spices, and the absence of sweet soy sauce.

Ikan bakar is usually served with sambal belacan (chili with shrimp paste) or sambal kecap (sliced chilli peppers and shallot in sweet soy sauce) as dipping sauce or condiment and slices of lemon as garnish. The East Indonesian Manado and Maluku ikan bakar usually uses rica-rica, dabu-dabu or colo-colo condiment.

== Variants ==
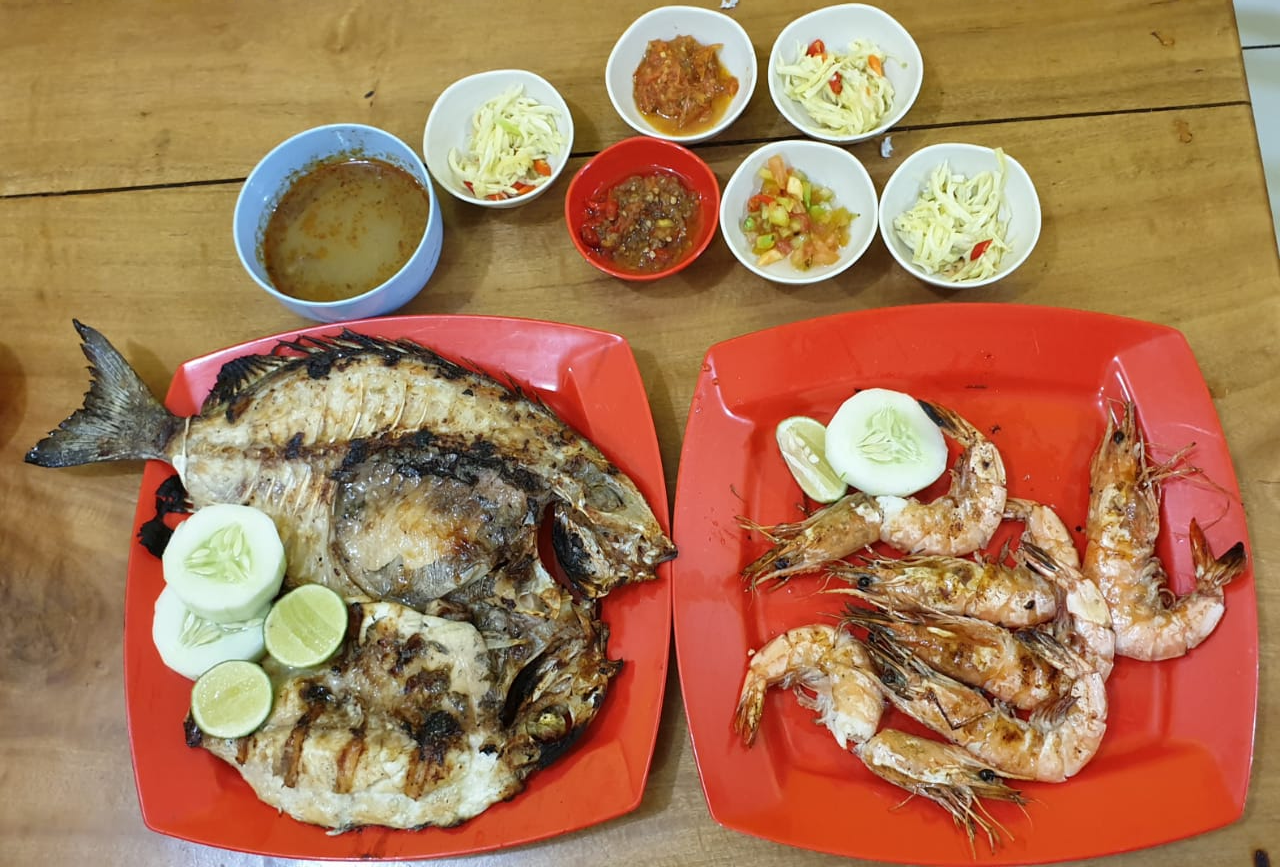
Ikan bakar and udang bakar (grilled shrimp) served with sambal and dabu-dabu in Jayapura, Papua.

There are many variants of ikan bakar, differ from the recipes of marinate spices, dipping sauces or sambals, to the species of fishes being grilled. Almost all kinds of edible fish and seafood can be made into ikan bakar, the most popular are freshwater gourami, patin and ikan mas, to seafood tongkol or cakalang, bawal, tenggiri, kuwe, baronang, kerapu, kakap merah (red snapper), and pari (stingray). Some of the popular forms of seafood besides fish include sotong (squid), and udang (shrimp).

== Tradition ==
=== Indonesia ===
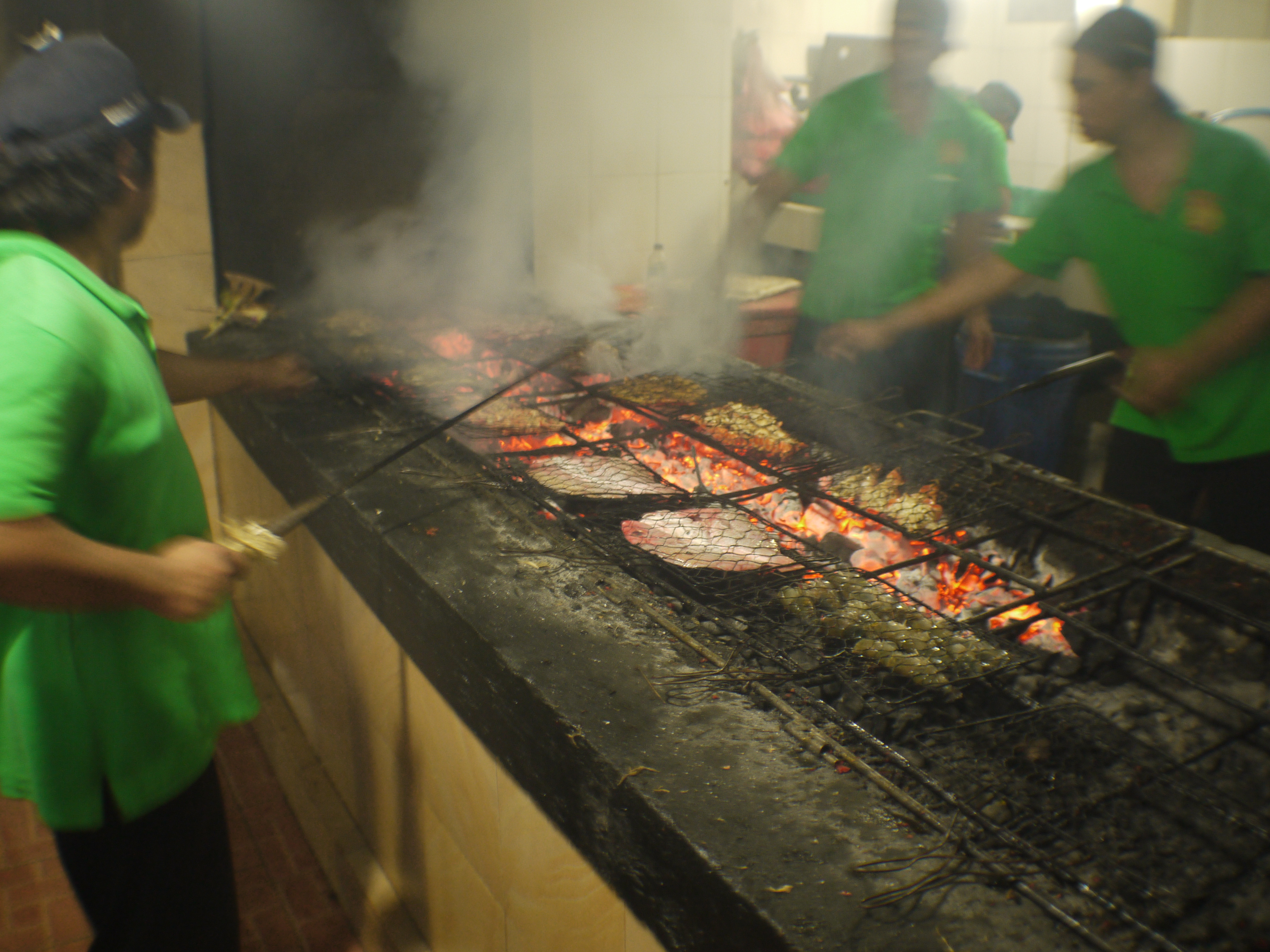
Grilling fish in Jimbaran, Bali.

Enjoying ikan bakar or grilled fish on a beach is a popular culinary itinerary during a visit to popular Indonesian tourism destinations; such as Jimbaran or Sanur beach in Bali, Losari beach in Makassar, and Muara Karang harbor in Jakarta.

In Indonesia, ikan bakar might be consumed any day throughout the year. However, in recent years, barbecuing fish and grilling corn cobs has grown to become a tradition on celebrating New Year's Eve. Ikan bakar and jagung bakar has become a New Year's barbecue party essentials among Indonesians., and is also popular in other celebrations, including Christmas and Eid.

== See also ==
- Ikan goreng
- Pecel Lele
- List of fish dishes
