= Indo cuisine =

Fusion of Indonesian and European cuisine

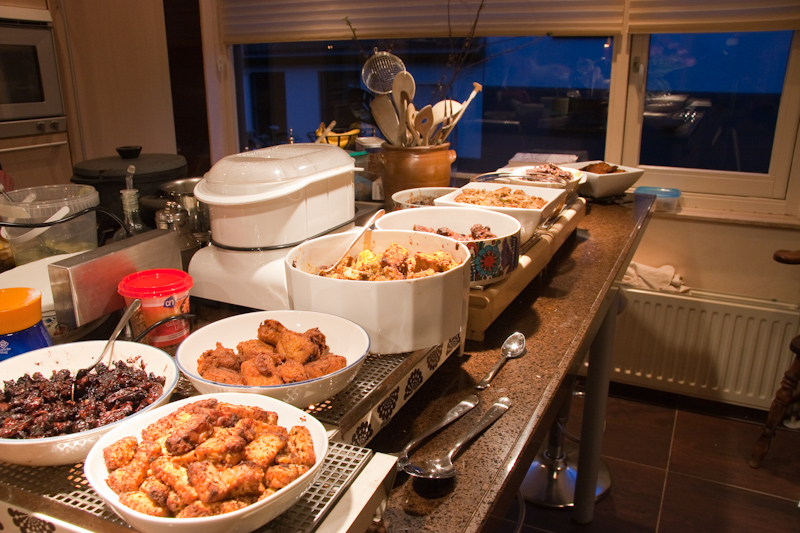
Rijsttafel, popular in Indonesia, the Netherlands and Belgium.

Indo cuisine is a fusion cooking and cuisine tradition, mainly existing in Indonesia and the Netherlands, as well as Belgium, South Africa and Suriname. This cuisine characterized of fusion cuisine that consists of original Indonesian cuisine with Eurasian-influences—mainly Dutch, also Portuguese, Spanish, French and British—and vice versa. Nowaday, not only Indo people consume Indo cuisine, but also Indonesians and Dutch people.

== History and origin ==
The Dutch colonial families through their domestic servants and cooks were exposed to Indonesian cuisine, as the result they developed a taste for native tropical spices and dishes. A notable Dutch East Indies colonial dish is rijsttafel, the rice table that consists of 7 to 40 popular dishes from across the colony. More an extravagant banquet than a dish, the Dutch colonials introduced the rice table not only so they could enjoy a wide array of dishes at a single setting but also to impress visitors with the exotic abundance of their colony.

Through colonialism the Dutch introduced European dishes such as bread, cheese, barbecued steak and pancake. As the producer of cash crops; coffee and tea were also popular in the colonial East Indies. Bread, butter and margarine, sandwiches filled with ham, cheese or fruit jam, poffertjes, pannenkoek and Dutch cheeses were commonly consumed by colonial Dutch and Indos during the colonial era. Some of the native upperclass ningrat (nobles) and a few educated native were exposed to European cuisine, and it was held with high esteem as the cuisine of upperclass elite of Dutch East Indies society. This led to the adoption and fusion of European cuisine into Indonesian cuisine. Some dishes which were created during the colonial era are Dutch influenced: they include selat solo (Solo salad), bistik jawa (Javanese beef steak), semur (from Dutch smoor), sayur kacang merah (brenebon) and sop buntut (oxtail soup). Cakes and cookies also can trace their origin to Dutch influences; such as kue bolu (tart), pandan cake, lapis legit (spekkoek), spiku (lapis Surabaya), klappertaart (coconut tart), and kaasstengels (cheese cookies). Kue cubit commonly found in front of schools and marketplaces are believed to be derived from poffertjes.

Indo culinary culture has made an enduring impact on Dutch society. There is no other place outside Indonesia with such an abundance of Indonesian food available. Indos played a pivotal role in introducing both Indonesian cuisine and Indo fusion cuisine to the Netherlands, making it so popular that some consider it an integral part of Dutch cuisine. The Countess C. van Limburg Stirum writes in her book "The Art of Dutch Cooking" (1962): here exist countless Indonesian dishes, some of which take hours to prepare; but a few easy ones have become so popular that they can be regarded as "national dishes". She provides recipes for dishes that have become commonplace in the Netherlands: nasi goreng (fried rice), pisang goreng (fried bananas), lumpia goreng (fried spring rolls), bami (fried noodles), satay (grilled skewered meat), satay sauce (peanut sauce), and sambal ulek (chilli paste). Most towns in the Netherlands will have an Indies or Indonesian restaurant and toko (shop). Even most Chinese restaurants have added Indonesian dishes to their menu such as babi panggang (roasted pork), and many now call themselves Chinese Indies Restaurants.

== Dishes ==
(In alphabetical order)

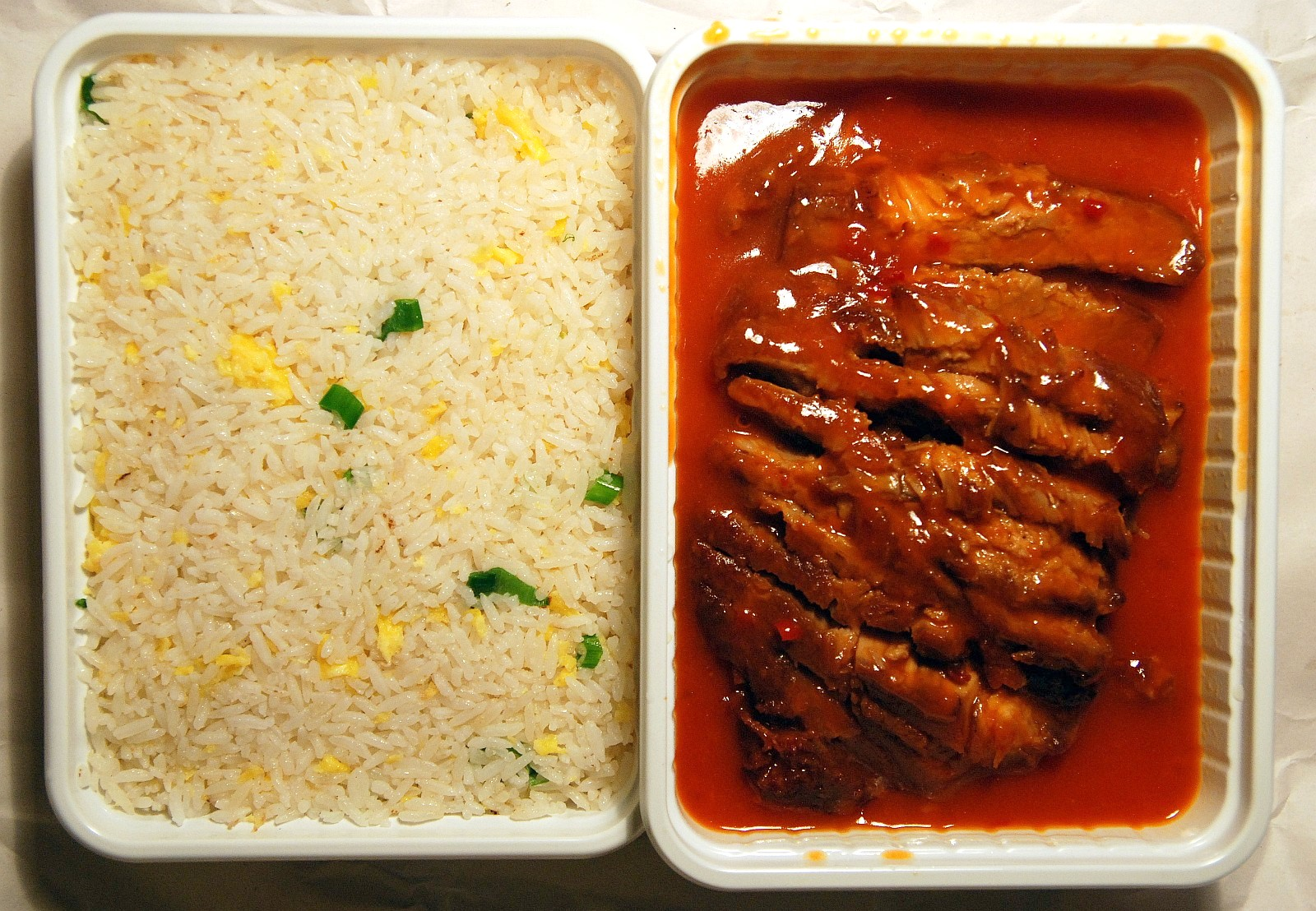
An Indo-style (Dutch) 'babi panggang speciaal met nasi', a popular takeaway combination in the Netherlands of fried pork with sauce and cooked rice.

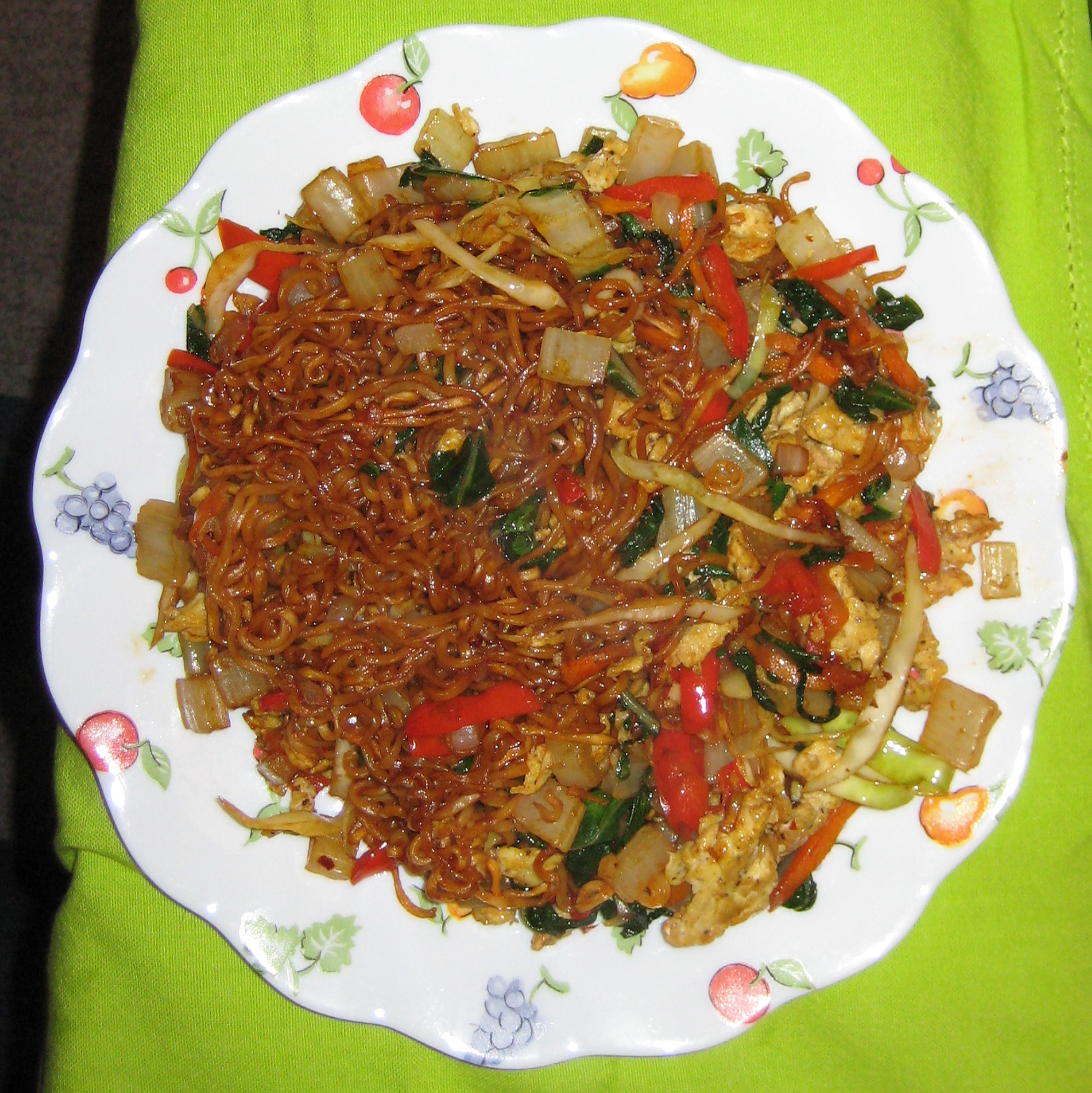
Fried bami, a variant of bakmi.

- Acar, pickled vegetables or fruits, usually made from different vegetables such as cucumber, carrots, cabbage, shallots, bird's eye chili and yardlong beans, which are pickled in vinegar, sometimes added with kaffir lime to add citrus aroma, and also dried chillies.
- Ayam kodok, stuffed and roasted chicken, commonly served as a holiday staple during Christmas and other special occasions.
- Babi kecap, pork belly braised in sweet soy sauce.
- Babi panggang, grilled or roasted pork dish served with a tomato-based sauce.
- Bakpau, Indonesian adaptation of Chinese baozi, filled with meat (usually minced pork, minced beef or diced chicken), chocolate, cheese, sweet mung bean paste or red bean paste
- Bami, wheat based noodles, generally prepared and topped with minced chicken or pork seasoned in soy sauce, green vegetables and a bowl of broth.
- Bamischijf, snack food consisting of a slice of bami, breaded and deep-fried.
- Bistik jawa, Javanese beef steak, a European-influenced dish from Solo. This dish almost similar to selat solo.
- Brenebon, red kidney bean soup, sometimes mixed with pig's trotters, beef or chicken.
- Friet sate, French fries served with satay. This term also refers to French fries topped with peanut sauce.
- Gado-gado, kind of boiled or blanched vegetables salad in peanut sauce.
- Klappertaart, coconut cake made from flour, sugar, milk, butter, as well as coconut flesh and juice.
- Kochi, dumpling made from glutinous rice flour, and stuffed with coconut fillings with palm sugar.
- Lumpia, fried or steamed fresh spring rolls, made of thin paper-like or crepe-like pastry and fillings.
  - Lumpia goreng, fried spring roll (lumpia) snack.
- Nasi goreng, fried rice with krupuk or sambal.
- Nasi rames, Indo take on Javanese dish of mixed rice.
- Nasischijf, deep-fried steamed rice, consisting of nasi goreng inside a crust of breadcrumbs.
- Pastel tutup, Shepherd's pie made with chicken and several vegetables such as carrot, green peas and boiled eggs, all topped with mashed potatoes.
- Perkedel, fried patties, made of ground potatoes, minced meat, peeled and ground corn or tofu, or minced fish.
- Pisang goreng, snack made of banana or plantain, covered in batter or not, being deep fried in hot cooking oil.
- Roti bakar, sandwich toast with various fillings.
- Roti gambang, rectangular shaped brown bread with sesame seeds, flavoured with cinnamon and palm sugar.
- Satay, skewered grilled meat. The popular types of satay in Indo cuisine, includes chicken, pork, goat and croquette satay.
- Satay sauce, peanut sauce.
- Selat solo, salad consisting of stewed beef, lettuce, carrot, green bean, and potato chips or French fries in sweet spiced dressing
- Semprong, wafer snack made by clasping egg batter using an iron mold (waffle iron) which is heated up on a charcoal stove.
- Semur, meat stew (mainly beef), that is braised in thick brown gravy. The main ingredient used in semur gravy is sweet soy sauce, shallots, onions, garlic, ginger, candlenut, nutmeg and cloves, sometimes pepper, coriander, cumin and cinnamon might be added.
- Shepherd's pie, traditional dish with meat and mashed potatoes with the addition of soy sauce, oyster sauce, Chinese mushrooms and garlic.
- Spekkoek, layered cake contains a mix of Indonesian spices, such as cardamom, cinnamon, clove, mace and anise. The cake is made of flour and yolk and is rich in butter or margarine.

== See also ==
- Cuisine of Indonesia
- Chinese Indonesian cuisine
- Javanese cuisine
- Malay cuisine
- Manado cuisine
- Peranakan cuisine
- List of European cuisines
- List of Asian cuisines
