= Eurasian cuisine =

Eurasian cuisine may refer to any of multiple fusion cuisines:

- Eurasian cuisine of Indonesia
- Eurasian cuisine of Singapore and Malaysia
