= Bamischijf =

Dutch snack

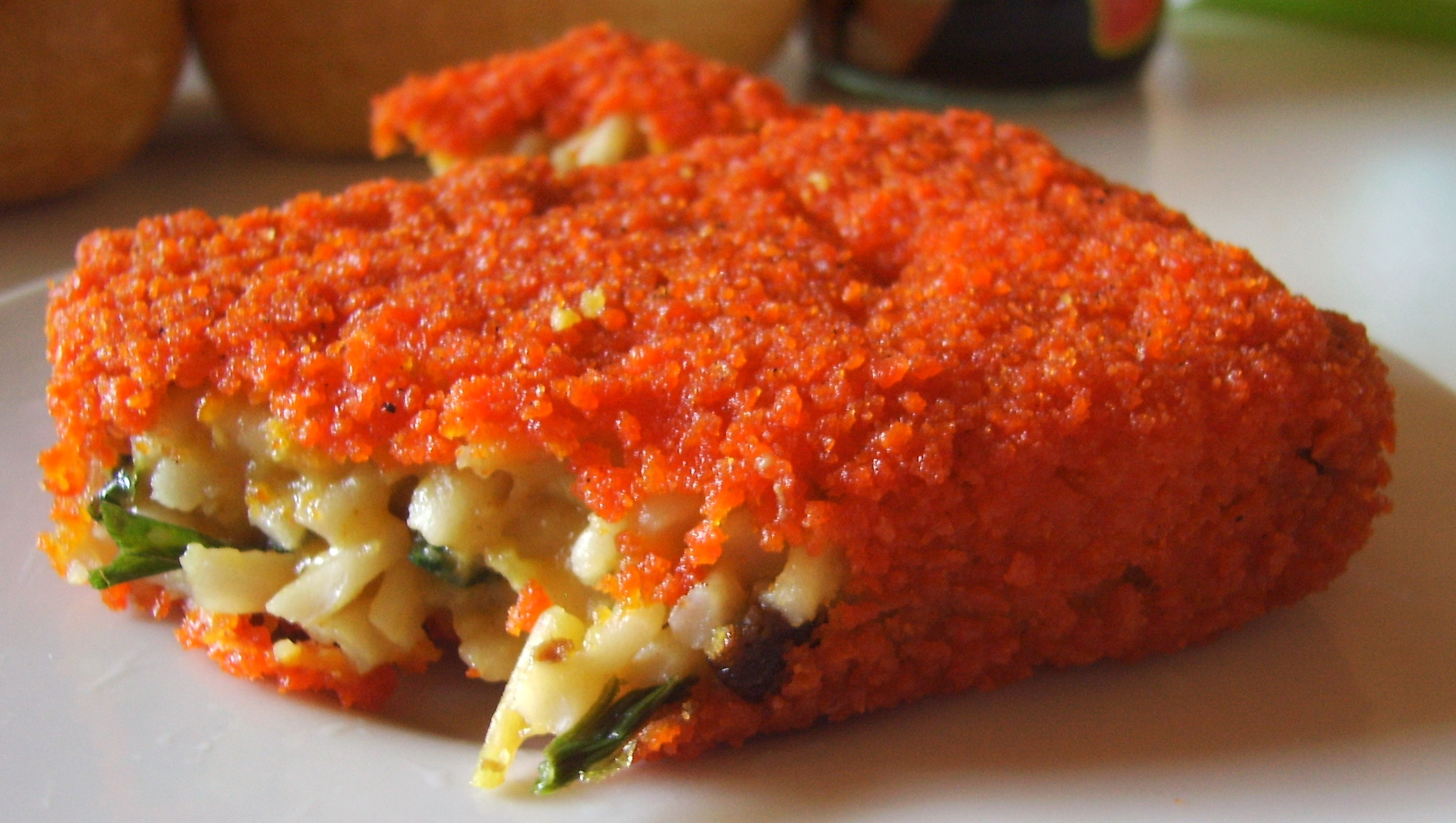
- Course: Snack
- Place of origin: Netherlands
- Region or state: Northwestern Europe
- Created by: Chinese Indonesian cuisine
- Main ingredients: noodles
- Variations: Croquette, Nasischijf

A bamischijf (Dutch pronunciation: [ˈbaːmisxɛif]) is a Dutch snack consisting of a disc (Dutch: schijf) of bami, breaded and deep-fried. It is a Dutch modification of the Chinese-Indonesian noodle dish bakmi goreng. A nasischijf (Dutch pronunciation: [ˈnɑsisxɛif]) is a similar dish made with nasi goreng.

== Preparation ==
The filling is prepared using a base of cooked bami. The ingredients are similar to those for bami goreng: vegetables and meat, with Indonesian spices and sauces. The noodles are packed as thick as possible so that the product's filling becomes dough-like in consistency. This mass is formed into a sausage roll, from which slices are cut. These slices are breaded and fried.

Much of this snack's production takes place in factories, where the product is prepared and then frozen, before being shipped to snackbars.

== Variations ==
Other varieties of bamischijf are usually named after their shape: bamiblok (bami block), bamibal (bami ball) and bamihap (bami bite). Another variation is the nasischijf (nasi slice), which consists of nasi rather than bami.

=== Nasischijf ===
The nasischijf (or nasibal when in ball form, or nasidisk in a disk shape) is a deep-fried snack consisting of nasi goreng encased in a breadcrumb coating. It is primarily popular in the Netherlands and Belgium. A similar snack, the bamischijf, replaces nasi goreng with bami goreng as the main ingredient.

The nasischijf originated from the Indonesian influence on Dutch cuisine, likely emerging in the 1950s as a way for toko (Indonesian-style stores) or snack bars to repurpose leftover rice. This influence reflects the broader incorporation of Indonesian flavors and ingredients into Dutch snacks following Indonesia's colonial history with the Netherlands.

The production process begins with cooking rice, which is then seasoned with spices to create the flavorful nasi goreng mixture. This rice mixture is formed into 'sausages' about 7 cm long, which are then sliced into rounds or balls and coated in breadcrumbs. The nasischijven are initially briefly deep-fried before being frozen. Once ready to serve, they are deep-fried again at cafeterias or snack bars.

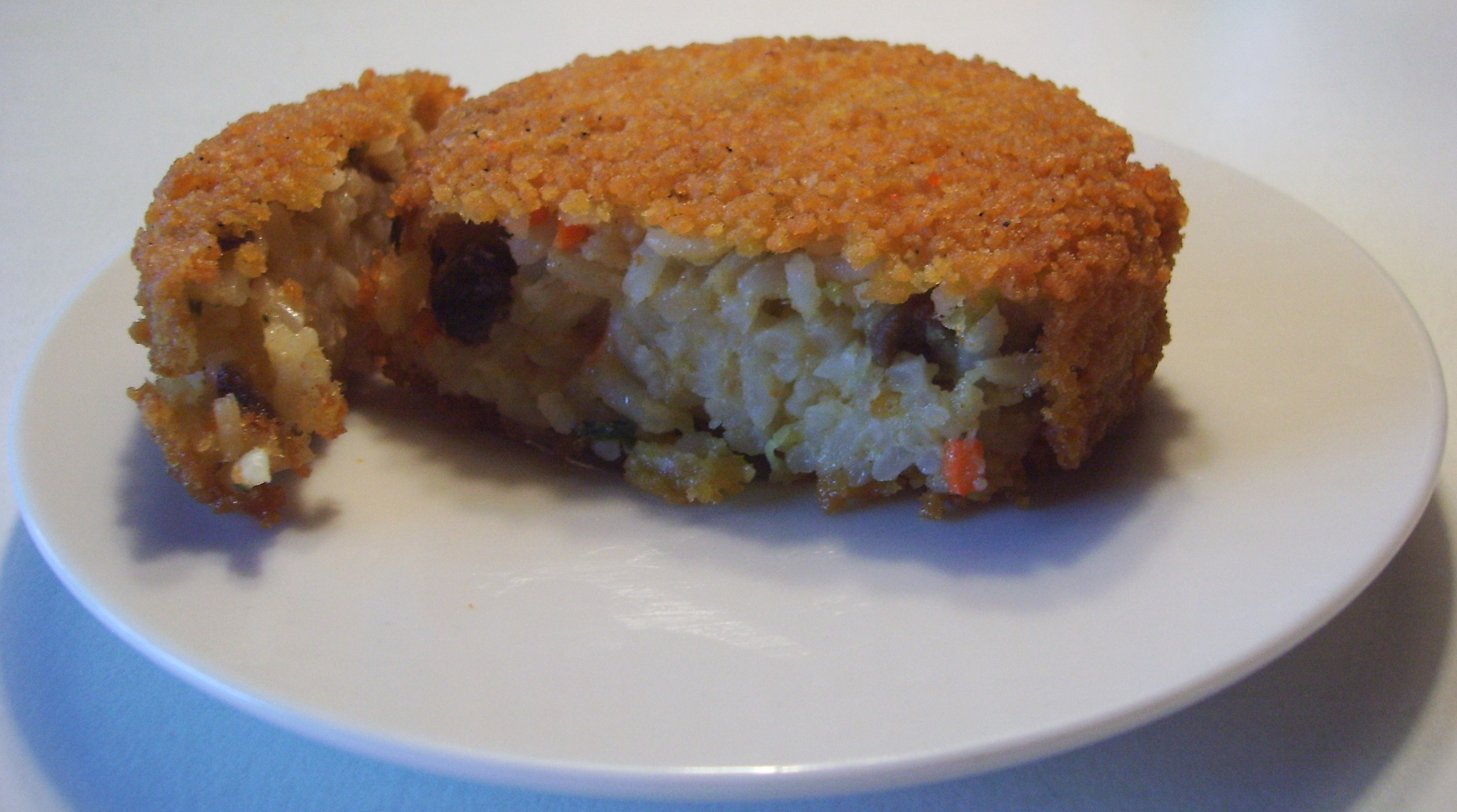
Nasischijf

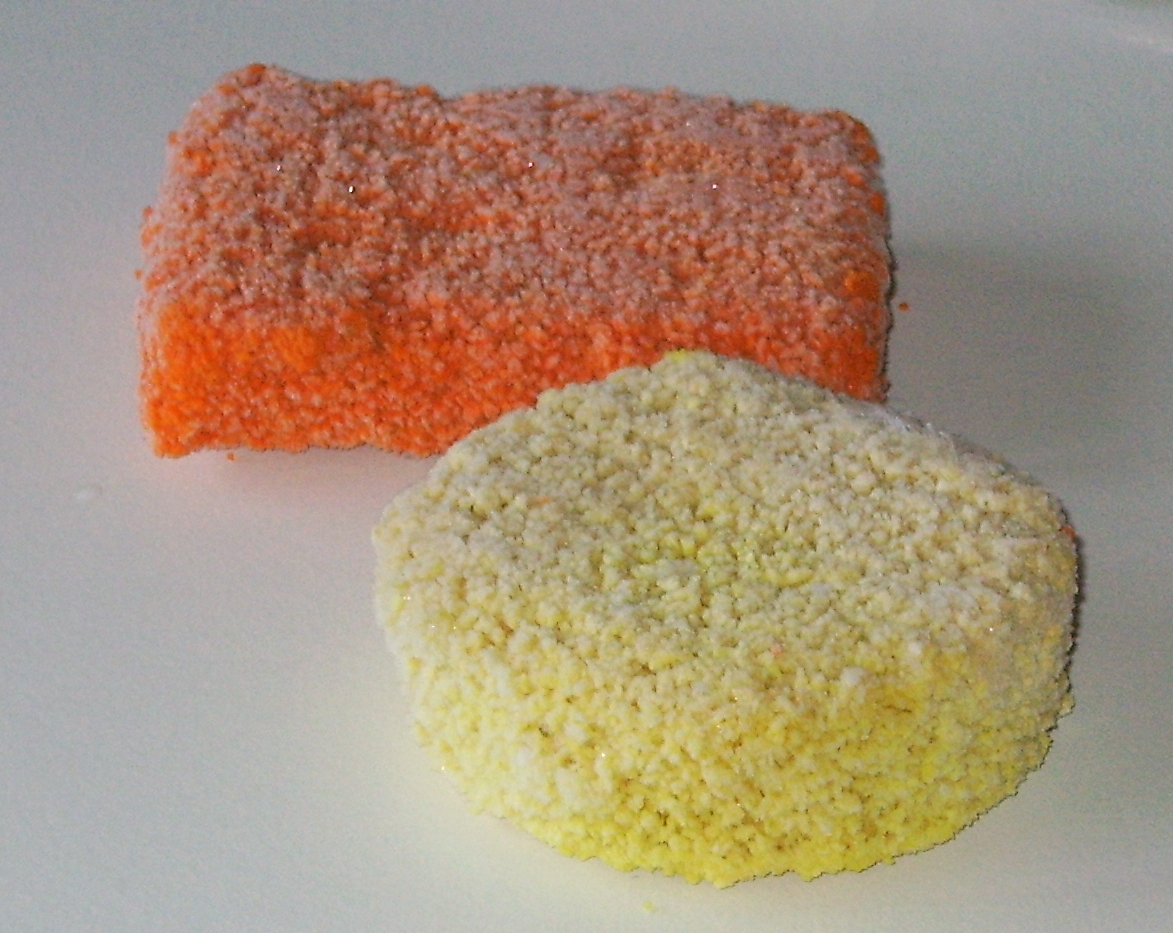
Nasischijf and bamihap, frozen

== See also ==
- Bakmi
- Indonesian cuisine
