= Dutch language in Indonesia =

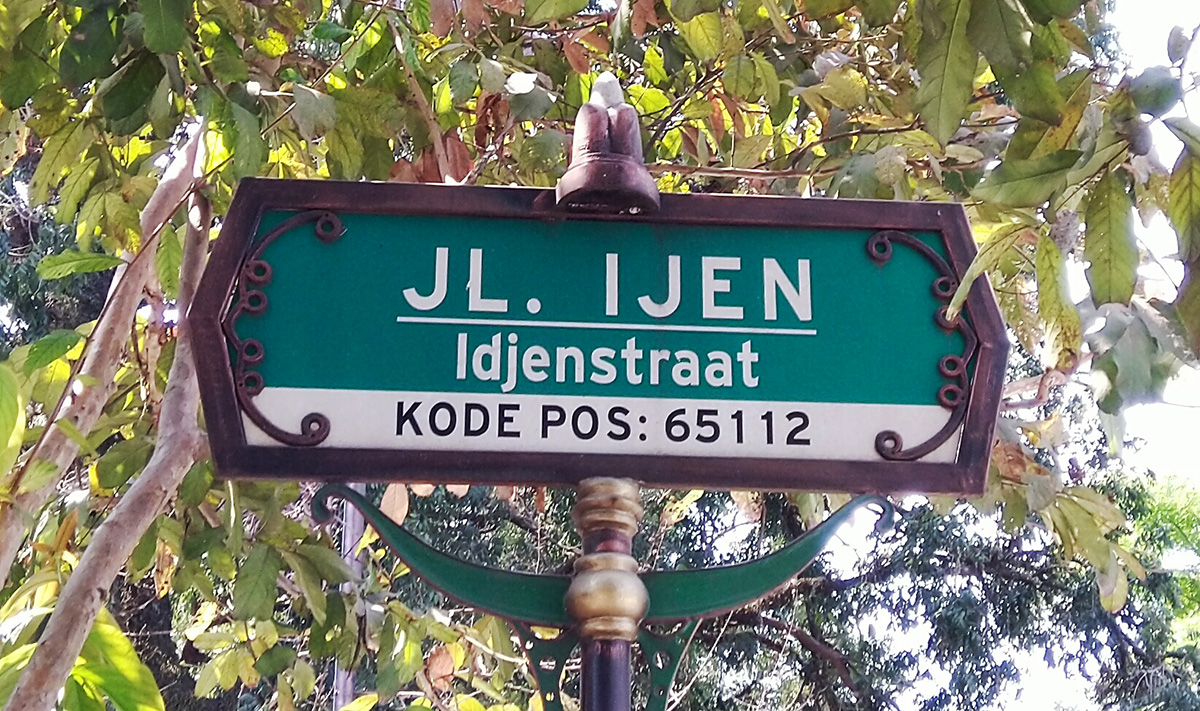
Street signs in Malang written in both Indonesian and Dutch

Dutch was the language used by Dutch settlers for centuries in the Indonesian archipelago, both when it was still colonized or partially colonized by the Netherlands. This language was the official language in the Dutch East Indies until World War II, as well as in Dutch New Guinea until the transfer of Western New Guinea to Indonesia in 1963.

== History ==
=== VOC era ===
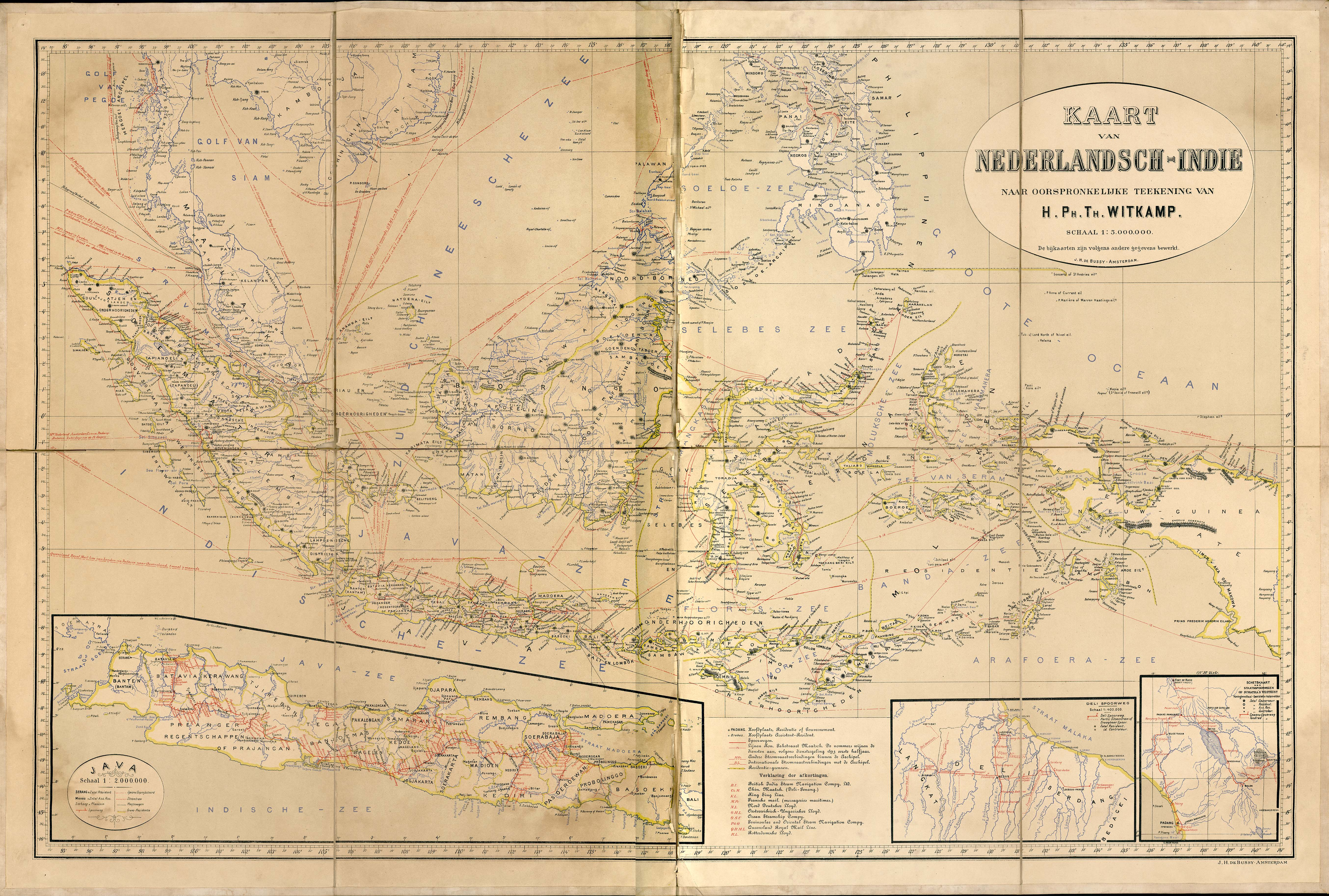
Map of the Dutch East Indies (Nederlands-Indië), 1893.

The general use of Dutch in Indonesia only started at the end of the colonial period. During the Dutch East India Company (VOC) period, Dutch was hardly used, and many regions actually used Low Malay as a lingua franca and language of trade. People who could speak Dutch had more rights. Only natives who could speak Dutch were allowed to wear hats, and native women were only allowed to marry Europeans if they could speak Dutch. Dutch schools were established in Ambon and Batavia. However, not everyone could attend these schools: there were very few of them, and they were usually only accessible to the elite and aristocracy. At school people spoke Dutch, but at home they often spoke Malay or Javanese.

In 1641, the Dutch colonial fleet took control of Malacca after seizing it from the Portuguese, making it an important port in the East Indies trade network. Until 1795, Malacca was occupied by the Dutch East India Company (VOC). As a result, the Dutch language also influenced the Portuguese-based creole language that developed there, known as Kristang, which later also evolved into the Mardijker Creole in Batavia.

The people of Ambon and Minahasa were known for their loyalty to the Dutch colonizers, with most of the men joining the Royal Netherlands East Indies Army (KNIL) and also adopting Dutch lifestyles and language. This legacy continued, and by the time of Indonesia's independence, these two ethnic groups were the most fluent—or at least somewhat able to speak Dutch—compared to other indigenous ethnic groups. Many of their communities now form a large Moluccan diaspora in the Netherlands, particularly from the Ambonese and other Maluku peoples.

=== 20th century ===
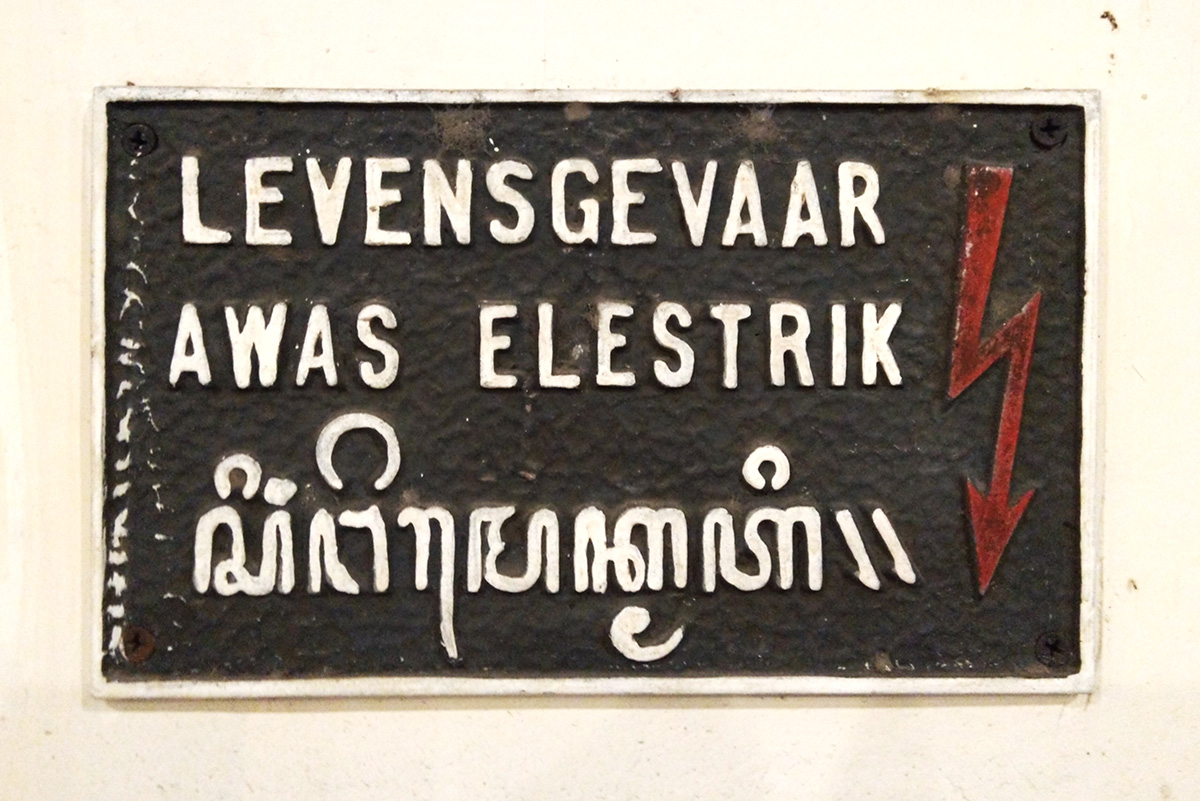
Old electrical voltage danger sign in Dutch, East Indies Malay, and Javanese in Surabaya.

A similar sign from Pontianak with the Dutch line erased, photographed in 2025.

Malay, like Dutch, became increasingly significant in the Dutch East Indies. However, beyond its role as a regional language, Malay was also widely used in British territories such as Malaya, Singapore, and Brunei, where it functioned as a lingua franca. Since the 20th century, the Dutch language gained formal recognition in Indonesia, and many Indonesians with Dutch ancestry continue to use it among family and friends. In 1942, following the Japanese occupation of the Dutch East Indies, the use of Dutch was banned, with only native Asian languages—such as Malay and Japanese—permitted for official and daily use.

After Indonesia's independence in 1945, which was formally recognized by the Netherlands in 1949, Dutch remained in use for an extended period, particularly among those with historical ties to the Netherlands. In some regions, Dutch proficiency continued to be regarded as a marker of a good education. Despite strong anti-Dutch sentiments following the Police Actions (agresi militer I dan II) and the Bersiap period, many Indonesians continued to respect the Dutch language. Sukarno, Indonesia's first president and proclaimer of independence, regularly spoke Dutch and read Dutch books annually. The Dutch language persisted in the region, partly because the Netherlands retained control of its colony, Netherlands New Guinea (Nugini Belanda), after 1949. Sukarno claimed that the territory rightfully belonged to Indonesia and engaged in prolonged negotiations with the Dutch over its status. Meanwhile, through colonial schools in Netherlands New Guinea, many indigenous Papuans were also introduced to the Dutch language, contributing to its continued presence in the region.

In Indonesia, individuals of Dutch orientation, mixed Dutch-Indonesian heritage, or those with past romantic ties to the Dutch were sometimes referred to by the derogatory term Londo Ireng. This term originates from Javanese, where Londo means Dutch and Ireng means black. The term is associated with "Belanda Hitam" (Black Dutch), a designation historically used in Indonesia to describe individuals whose parents or grandparents had aligned with the Dutch colonial administration. The phrase carried negative connotations and was often used in a discriminatory or pejorative context.

==== Post-1949 ====
Following Indonesia's independence, the use of Dutch did not immediately disappear. Dutch remains a source language in Indonesia, and certain documents in Dutch have retained their official status as government records. Historically, Dutch also functioned as a language of trade in Indonesia. However, in modern times, English has become far more significant in this domain. Fluency in Dutch today is primarily limited to elderly individuals and a portion of their younger relatives, particularly in major cities on Java, Minahasa, Maluku, and Western New Guinea. In Papua, the continued presence of Dutch speakers is attributed to the Netherlands' administration of the region until 1963. Those proficient in Dutch typically learned the language in school and still use it in conversations with one another, at reunions, or when interacting with foreigners. Dutch remains an important language in some areas, such as Depok (the old city), Ambon, and Manado. In major cities across Indonesia, Dutch is primarily spoken by Indo-European communities and, to a lesser extent, by Western-oriented Chinese minorities in cities such as Bandung, Malang, Semarang, Surabaya, and parts of Jakarta, where it is still occasionally used.

== Current usage ==
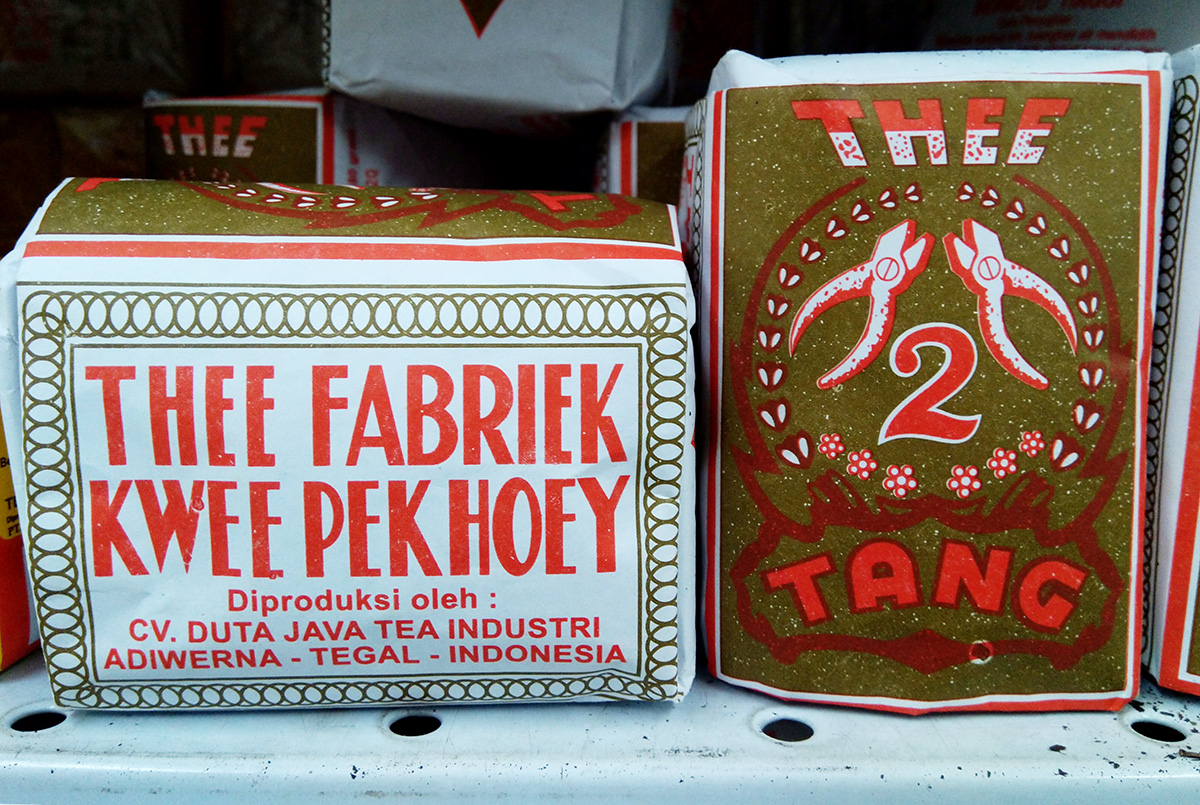
A tea packaging sold in Indonesia that retains its original design and Dutch-era spelling.

Since 1971, Universitas Indonesia (UI) in Depok has been the only university in Indonesia with a Dutch Language Department. Interest in studying Dutch is driven by its historical influence on Indonesian law, as the country's legal system is partially based on Dutch law, and many colonial-era texts remain relevant. Additionally, historical, linguistic, philological, and medical sources from earlier periods are often written in Dutch, making proficiency in the language valuable for research. Vocational education institutions offering Dutch language courses can also be found in cities such as Semarang, Bandung, Surabaya, and Yogyakarta. These institutions often cater to a broader audience, including younger generations who wish to learn Dutch to understand their grandparents' language, study Indonesian history, or pursue tourism-related careers, such as becoming tour guides. Alongside English, Arabic, Japanese, and Mandarin, Dutch remains a popular language of study in Indonesia. Each year, more than 10,000 Indonesians enroll in Dutch language programs offered by schools and private courses.

== Population ==
The number of speakers was around 500,000 in 1984. Most of the speakers were elderly people who still had memories of the Dutch language. This number is speculative, and it is difficult to estimate—these speakers were a minority that could be ignored in a population of over 130 million people at that time. However, looking back further, especially at the early years of World War II in the 1940s, the number of speakers was not much different. Out of 400,000 people fluent in Dutch, most of them were of mixed descent or of Dutch origin, with another 200,000 possibly having at least some knowledge or being able to speak a little Dutch.

=== Census statistics ===
- 1900 Census: 5,000 speakers (0.012%) out of 29 million residents of the Dutch East Indies (75,000 Europeans).
- 1920 Census: 60,000 speakers (0.12%) out of 48 million residents of the Dutch East Indies (170,000 Europeans).
- 1940 Census: 773,000 speakers (1.1%) out of 70 million residents of the Dutch East Indies (290,000 Europeans).

== Relationship with Indonesian and Malay ==
=== Dutch language influence ===
The Dutch language has also had a significant influence and contributed a large number of vocabulary words to Indonesian, Javanese, and other languages in Indonesia. Approximately 10,000 Dutch words have been absorbed into Indonesian, such as:

- knalpot, bekleding, vermaak, achteruit, absurd, afdruk, belasting, bestek, bom, bretel, debat, degen, doktorandus, drama, elan, fabel, flop, fotomodel, fraude, giro, gratis, handel, harem, hutspot, inklaring, jas, kabinet, kanker, kansel, krat, kop, lading, loket, marmer, masker, matras, mondeling, nota, notaris, oma, onderneming, oom, opa, pan, pater, punt, rekening, rimpel, salaris, seks, sigaret, skelet, tank, tante, testikel, tol, urine, vla, wastafel, wortel.

However, some of these words are no longer in use. For example, hutspot is no longer common, and sigaret has largely been replaced by rokok. The latter word essentially originates from the Dutch word roken, which means "to smoke."

There are also words that are written differently but are often pronounced the same:

- adopsi, apel, asprak, bagasi, bandit, baterai, bioskop, debil, demisioner, duane, ekonomi, energi, ereksi, finansiil, frustrasi, garansi, generasi, granat, handuk, higiene, ideologi, imbesil, impoten, inflasi, jenewer, kampiun, kantor, kardiolog, kastrasi, kondom, kran, kristen, kuitansi, langsam, losion, makelar, marsepen, menstruasi, monarki, opas, operasi, overproduksi, panekuk, parlemen, pesimis, polisi, posbus, poskantor, resesi, revolusi, segregasi, sigar, skorsing, spanduk, tabu, taksi, tanpasta, toleran, vegetarir, verplehster, wanprestasi.

After Indonesia's independence, some of these loan words were deliberately changed to suit Indonesian pronunciation. For example, universitet and kwalitet were replaced with universitas and kualitas, which slightly reduced the Dutch character.

Other words appear to come from Dutch. For example, here are the Dutch equivalents:

- abésé (ABC, alfabet), air ledeng (leidingwater), amplop (enveloppe), arbei (aardbei), ateret (achteruit), besenegeng (bezuiniging), buku (boek), dasi (stropdas), dopercis (doperwten), dus (douche), efisen (efficiënt), ember (emmer), fakultas kedokteran (medische faculteit), gaji (gage), gemente (gemeente), hasyis (hasjies), hopagen (hoofdagent), insinyur (ingenieur), interviu ('interview', also from English), kakus (kakhuis, wc), kantor pos (postkantoor), keker (verrekijker), keroket (kroket), klep knalpot (uitlaatklep), komunis (communist), kopor (koffer), koterek (kurketrekker), lengseng (lezing), masase (massage), meisyes (muisjes, hagelslag), netral (neutraal), om (oom), ongkos (onkosten), otobus (autobus), pakansi/vakansi (vakantie), persnelling (versnelling) pipa (pijp), pofercis (poffertjes), puisi (poëzie), rebewes (rijbewijs), reboisasi (herbebossing), sakelek (zakelijk), stasiun (station), teh (thee), wese (wc), zeni (genie).

However, many of the words mentioned above are also loanwords into Dutch from other languages, such as French.

=== Influence from Indonesian/Malay ===
On the other hand, Dutch and Afrikaans also have words borrowed from Indonesian/Malay. Some of them are related to dishes:

- nasi, bami, babi pangang, ketjap, atjar, gadogado, kroepoek, emping, saté, mango, sambal, loempia, boemboe, trassi, klapper, sereh, peteh[bonen], laos, lombok, kemiri[bonen], pi(e)sang.

Other vocabulary includes, for example:

- kaki (voot), batik, pasar, kris, gamelan, baboe, wajang, piekeren (pikir, denken), pienter (pintar, slim), amok, klamboe, karbouw, rimboe, orang oetan, soesa, senang, bakeleien, banjeren, amper, pakkie-an, gladjakker, branie, goeroe, soebatten, tabee, plopper, sarong, koelie, tang ('wanita jahat'), toko, patjakker, tempo doeloe, bazar, oorlam, kongsi, goenagoena, bersiap, beo, desa, gonje, guttapercha, kali, kassian, mandiën, negorij, krontjong, rotan, sawah, totok, toean, njai, nonna, liplap, kraton, klewang.

Some words in Afrikaans also come from Malay.

- baar ('inexperienced, beginner'; from baru), piesang (banana), baie ('very'; from banyak)

== Dutch-based creole languages ==
There are several Dutch-based creole languages, most of which are currently spoken by migrants to the Netherlands, and are slowly but surely dying out as the first generation of Indo-Dutch people disappears, such as the Petjo and Javindo languages that were originally spoken in Java.

== See also ==
- Standard Dutch
- Surinamese Dutch
- Afrikaans
