= Warung =

Type of small, traditionally family-owned business in Indonesia

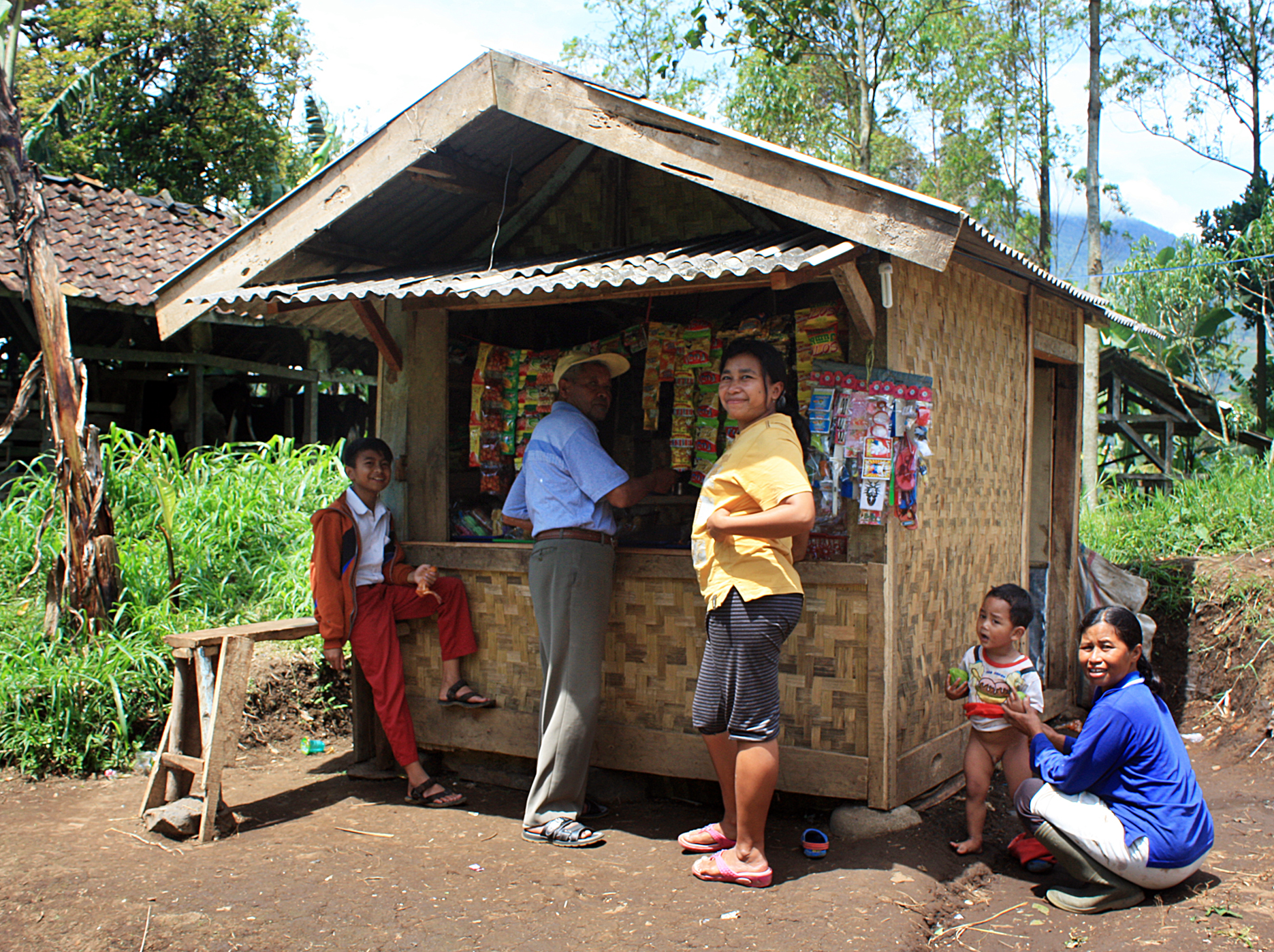
A village warung in Garut

A warung (old spelling: waroeng or warong) is a type of small, traditionally family-owned business — small retail, eatery, or café — in Indonesia. A warung is an essential part of daily life in Indonesia. Over time, the term warung has shifted somewhat — especially among foreign visitors, expatriates, and people abroad — to refer more specifically to a modest Indonesian eatery or a place that sells Indonesian retail items (mostly groceries or foodstuff). But for the majority of Indonesians, it still refers to a small, neighborhood convenience shop, often a front room or booth in a family's home.

There are tourist-serving establishments on the island of Bali and elsewhere that attach the term warung to their business to indicate their Indonesian nature. Traditionally, warung is indeed a family-owned business, run by the family members, mostly by women.

Traditional warungs are made from wood, bamboo, or woven thatch. More permanent warungs are stalls made from bricks and concrete, which are often family-owned businesses attached to their homes. Some smaller portable warungs are made from tin, zinc, or molded fiberglass in some modern versions. Warung tenda is a portable tent-based warung, covered with canvas, fabric, tarp, or plastic sheet tent for roofing.

== Terminology ==
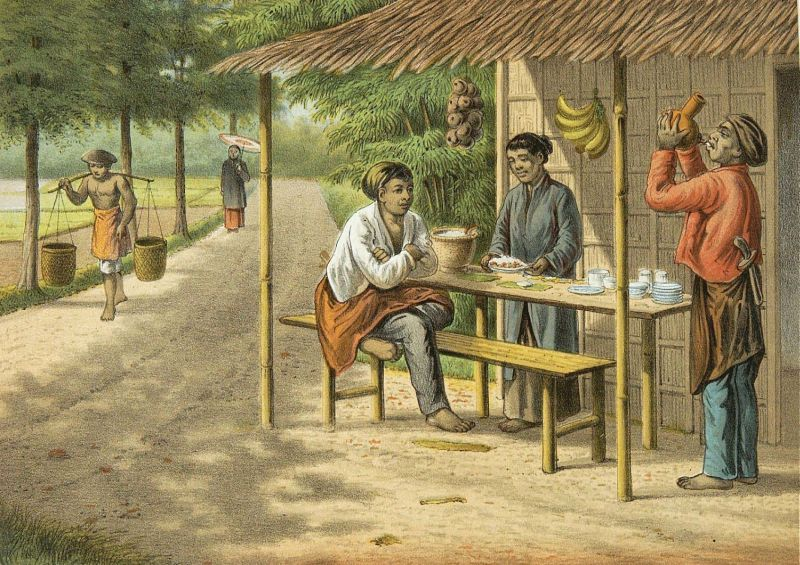
A 19th-century image of warung during the colonial period

The term warung simply denotes a wide category of small businesses, either a small retail shop or an eatery. It is widely used in Java and most of Indonesia. In certain parts of Sumatra and the Malay Peninsula, the word kedai is sometimes used as well. In Javanese culture areas, such as in Yogyakarta, Semarang, and Surakarta, its counterpart term wedhangan or angkringan is more commonly found. On the other hand, the term toko is used for a larger and more established shop.

The term can be used to loosely refer to many other types of shops, including the wartel (short for warung telepon, essentially a staffed phone booth) and warnet (short for warung internet Internet café).

== Varieties ==
There are many kinds of warung, some take the form of a small shop that sells cold bottled drinks, candy, cigarettes, snacks, krupuk, and other daily necessities, while the larger ones are small restaurant establishments. A warung that sells food typically sells easily prepared local foods; pisang goreng and many kinds of gorengan, nasi goreng (fried rice), and mie goreng (fried noodles).

On the resort island of Bali and Lombok, warung might refer to a touristy cabana cafe that sells locals' favourites as well as Asian or Western food. Other than Indonesian dishes, on their menu there might be a selection of soups, steaks, fries, sandwiches, or grilled fish.

Some types of warung are:

- Warung rokok or common warung is a very small street-side shop, constructed from wood, bamboo, or tin. Most of them measure not more than 2 by 1 meter (6.6 by 3.3 feet). They sell rokok (cigarettes), cold bottled drinks, snacks and candies, krupuk, soap, toothpaste, and other daily necessities, essentially a miniaturized convenience store. This is the most commonly distributed warung, sprung in residential areas, slums, street sides, and tucked between high-rise business areas.
- Warkop or warung kopi is a small cafe or coffee shop that sells coffee and snacks, such as roasted peanuts, rempeyek, krupuk, pisang goreng, and bread. At one point, the Malaysian and Singaporean counterpart kopi tiam, gained popularity instead of the humble local warung kopi. Traditionally, warung kopi served a social function as a gathering place for men of the village to socialize and trade news. Overtime, specialty cafes flourished spurred by the surge of the local's interest in quality coffee. As a result, various cafes were growing, from humble warung kopi to fancy coffee shop selling artisan and premium specialty coffee.
- Warung nasi is a humble small restaurant that sells nasi (rice) with other Indonesian dishes. Instead of separate tables and chairs, a long communal bar and bench are usually provided for customers to dine at.
- Warteg or warung tegal is a more specific warung nasi, established by Javanese people from the town of Tegal in Central Java. They sell favourite Javanese dishes and rice. A wide array of pre-cooked dishes is arranged in glass-windowed cupboards. They are well known for selling modestly priced meals, popular among the working class such as low-skilled laborers in the cities.
- Warung padang is a small scaled Padang restaurant. It usually provides a bar and bench instead of tables and chairs for seating and, sometimes, a choice of fewer dishes. Larger scale more established Padang eateries are referred to as rumah makan padang or Padang restaurant instead.
- Warung jamu specifically sells jamu traditional herbal medicine.
- Warnet or warung internet is an internet cafe.
- Wartel or warung telepon is a staffed phone booth.
- Pedagang Kaki Lima (PKL) are vendors operating a pull cart. Their name (literally "Five-footed merchant") refers to the sidewalk (also called five-foot way) the carts occupy while open. In colloquial term, it also refers to the two legs of the vendor, the two cartwheels, and a monopod stand for operations, making the establishment composed of five foot. A warung might be based on a PKL's cart, which represents one of the most humble warungs of all.

Most of the time, warungs are named after the main dishes they sell. For example, warung bubur kacang ijo or warung burjo sells bubur kacang hijau, warung roti bakar sells grilled bread, warung pecel lele sells pecel lele or fried catfish with sambal, while warung indomie sells cooked instant noodles, although the brand might not always be Indomie.

== Gallery ==
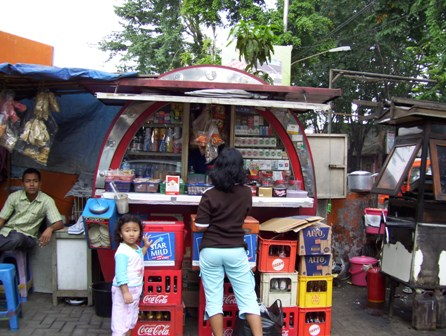
Warung rokok, cigarette-selling warung.

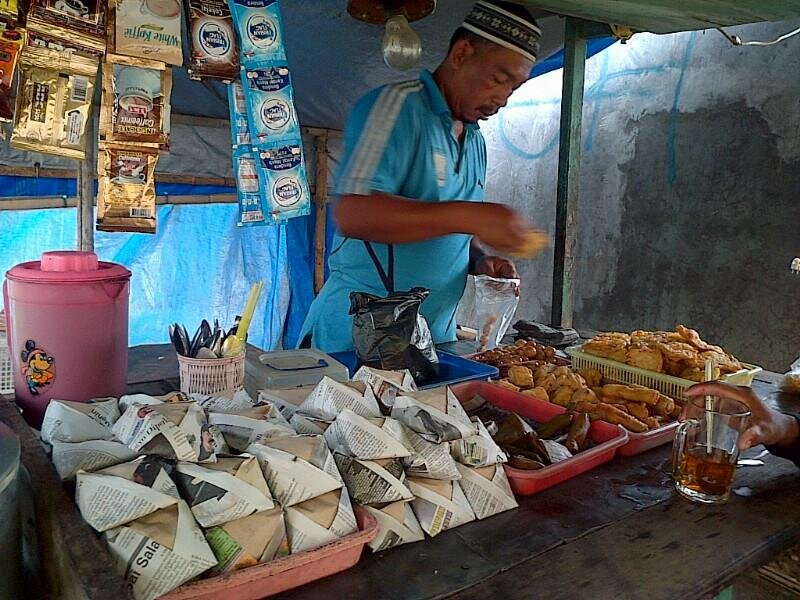
Warung kopi, small coffee shop selling coffee, tea, and snacks.

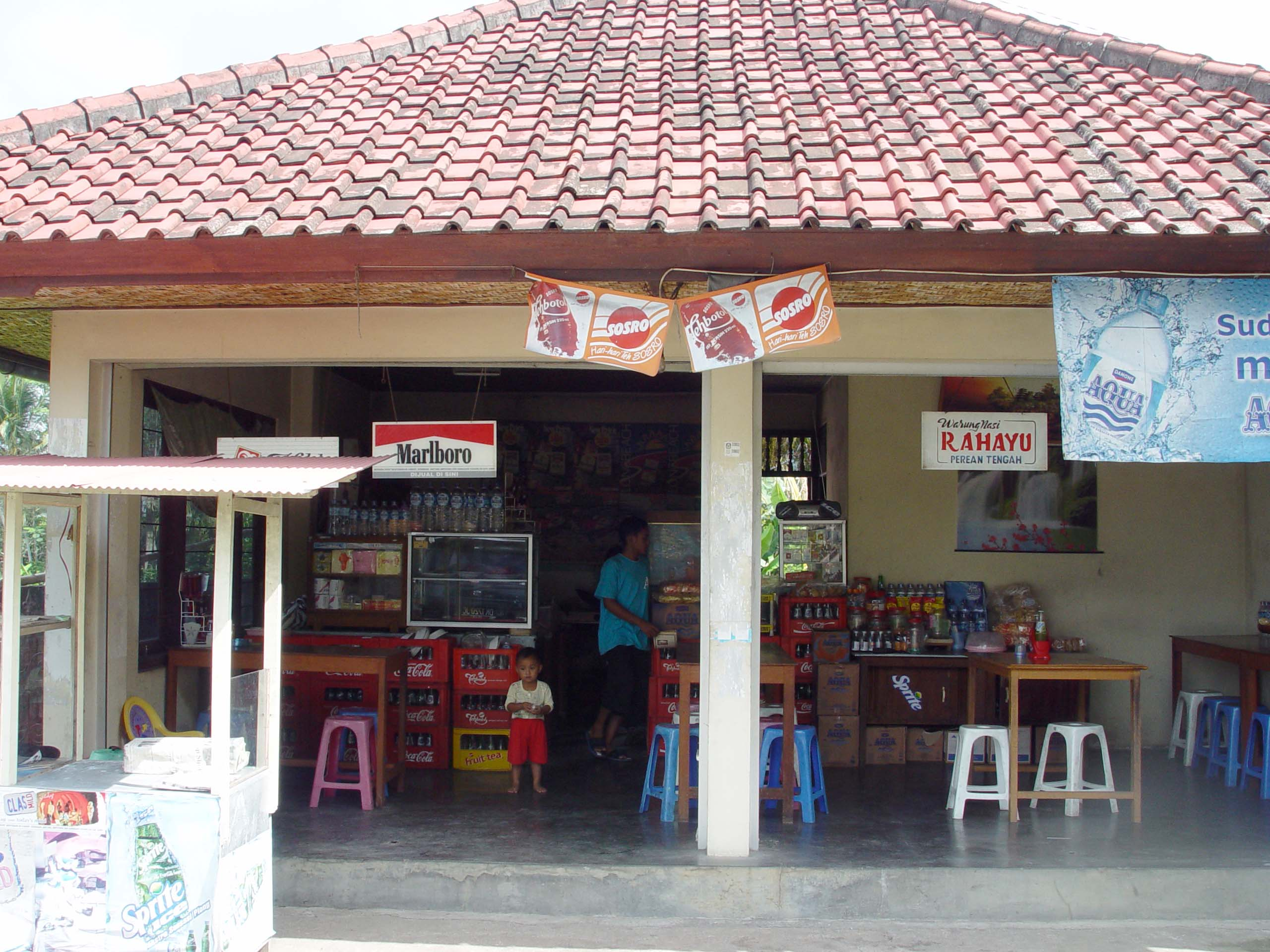
Warung nasi, selling food in Bali.

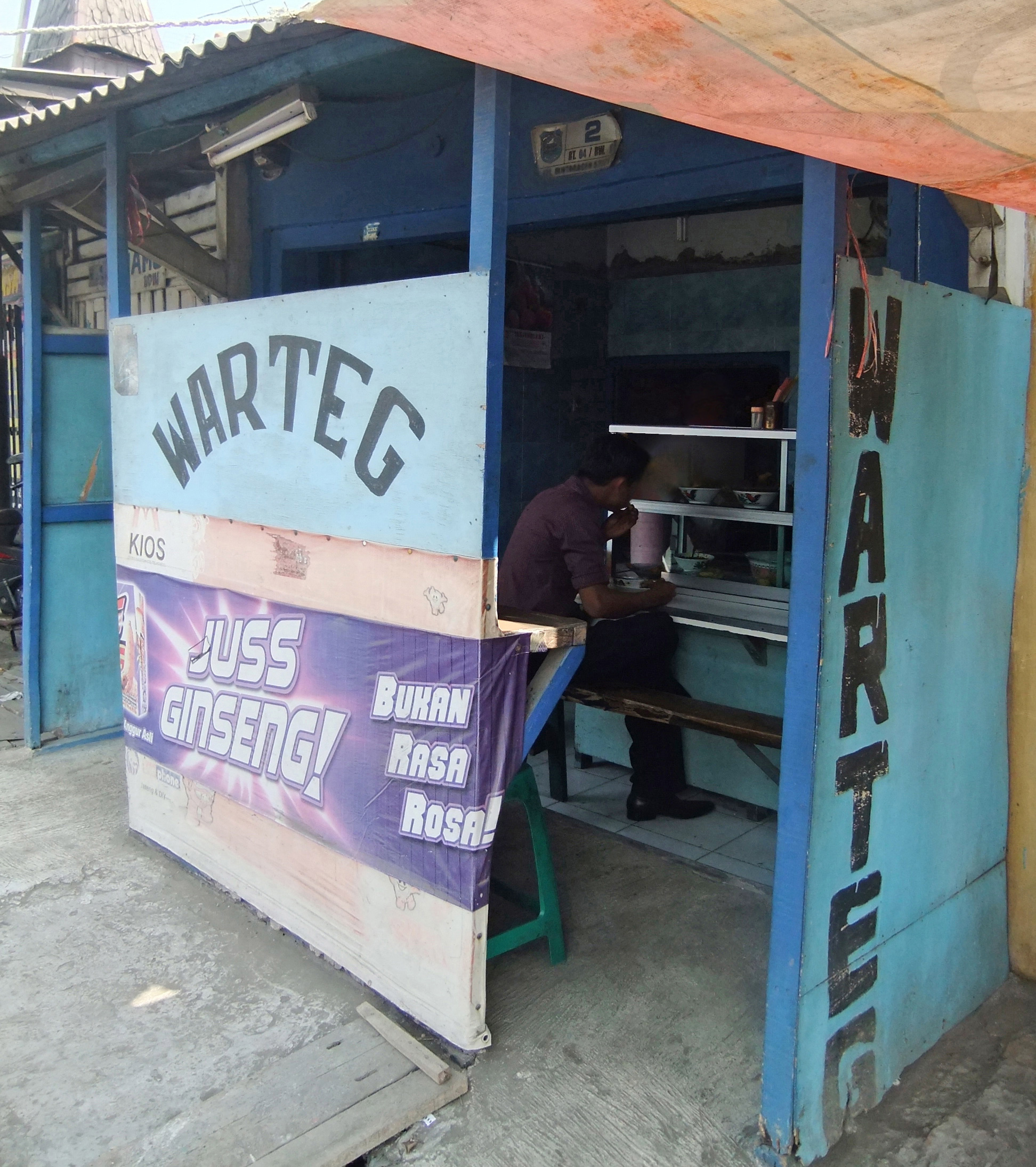
Warung Tegal, selling Javanese food from Tegal.

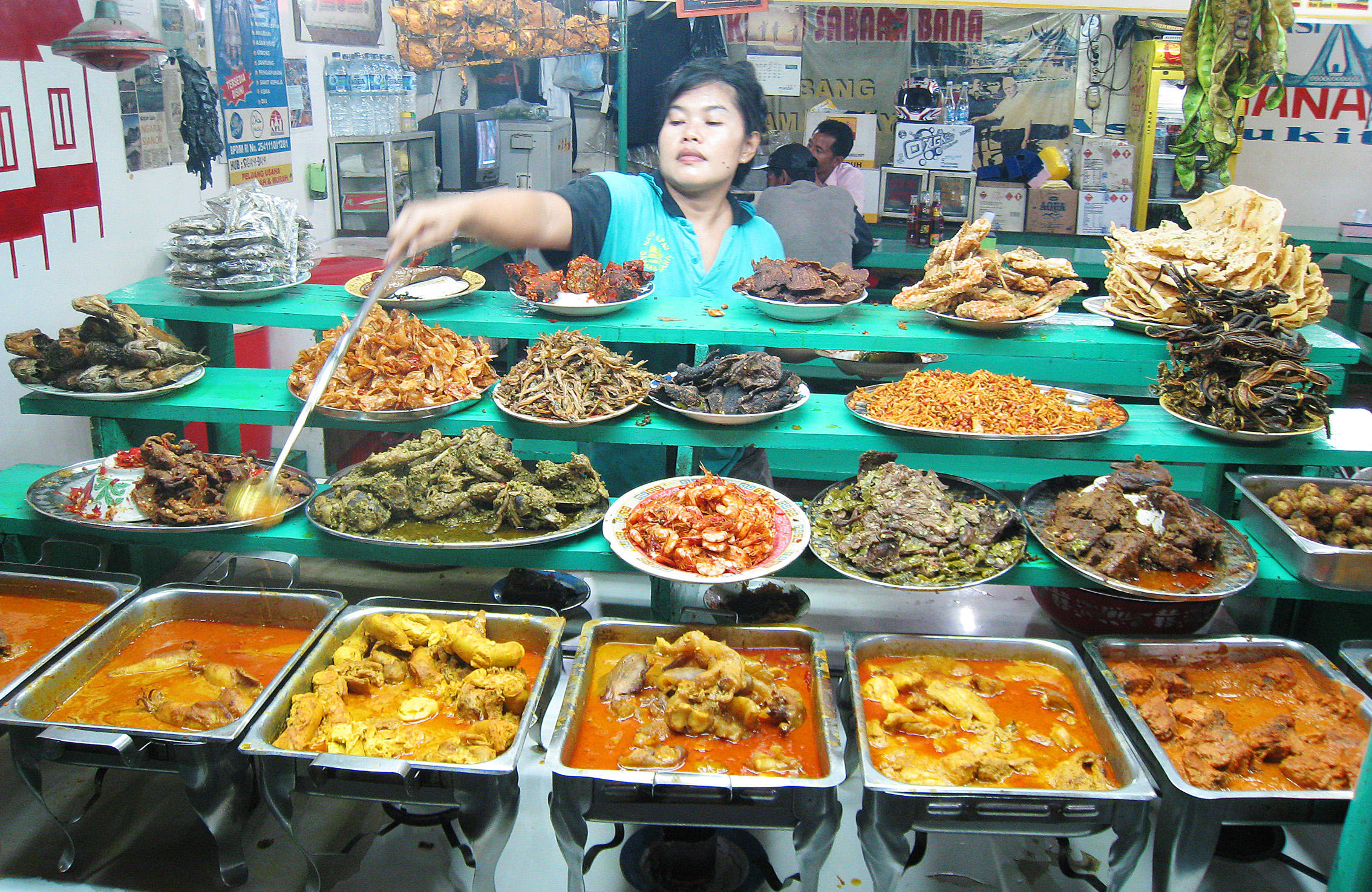
Warung Padang selling Padang food.

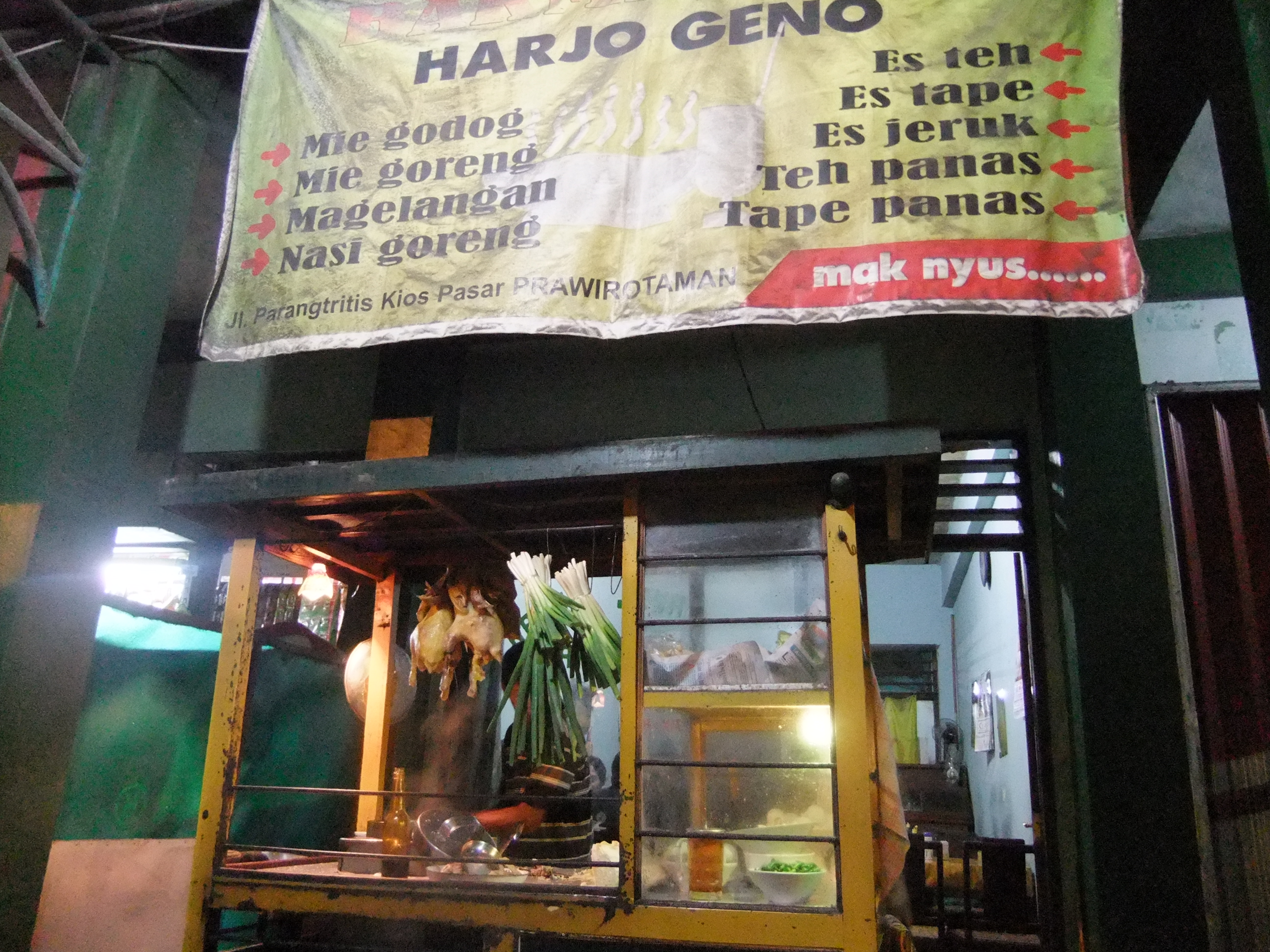
A warung selling bakmi jawa (Javanese noodles).

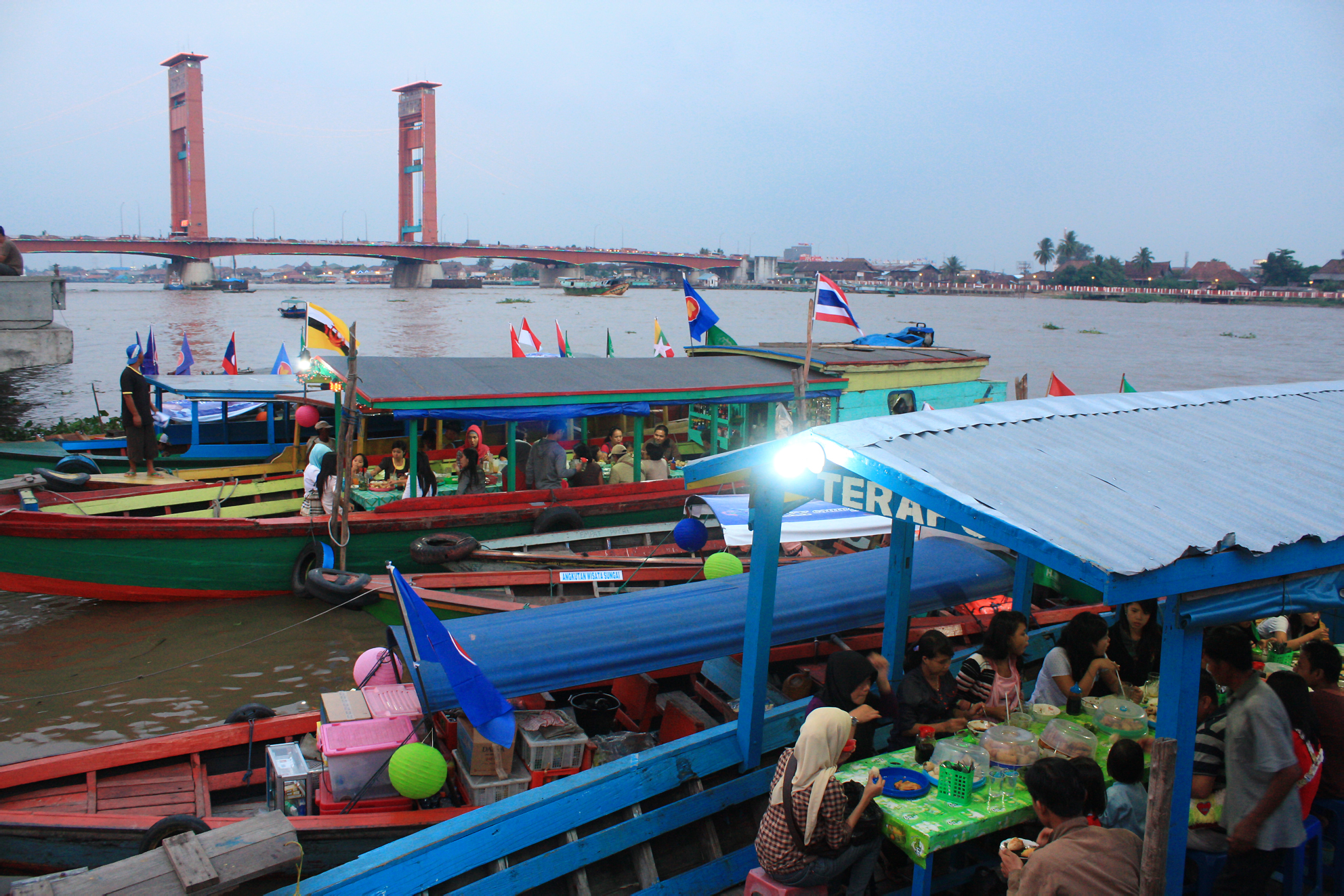
Floating warung on boat on the bank of the Musi River, Palembang.

== See also ==
- Toko
- Kopi tiam
- Sari-sari store
- Mamak stall
