= Ayam kodok =

Indonesian chicken dish

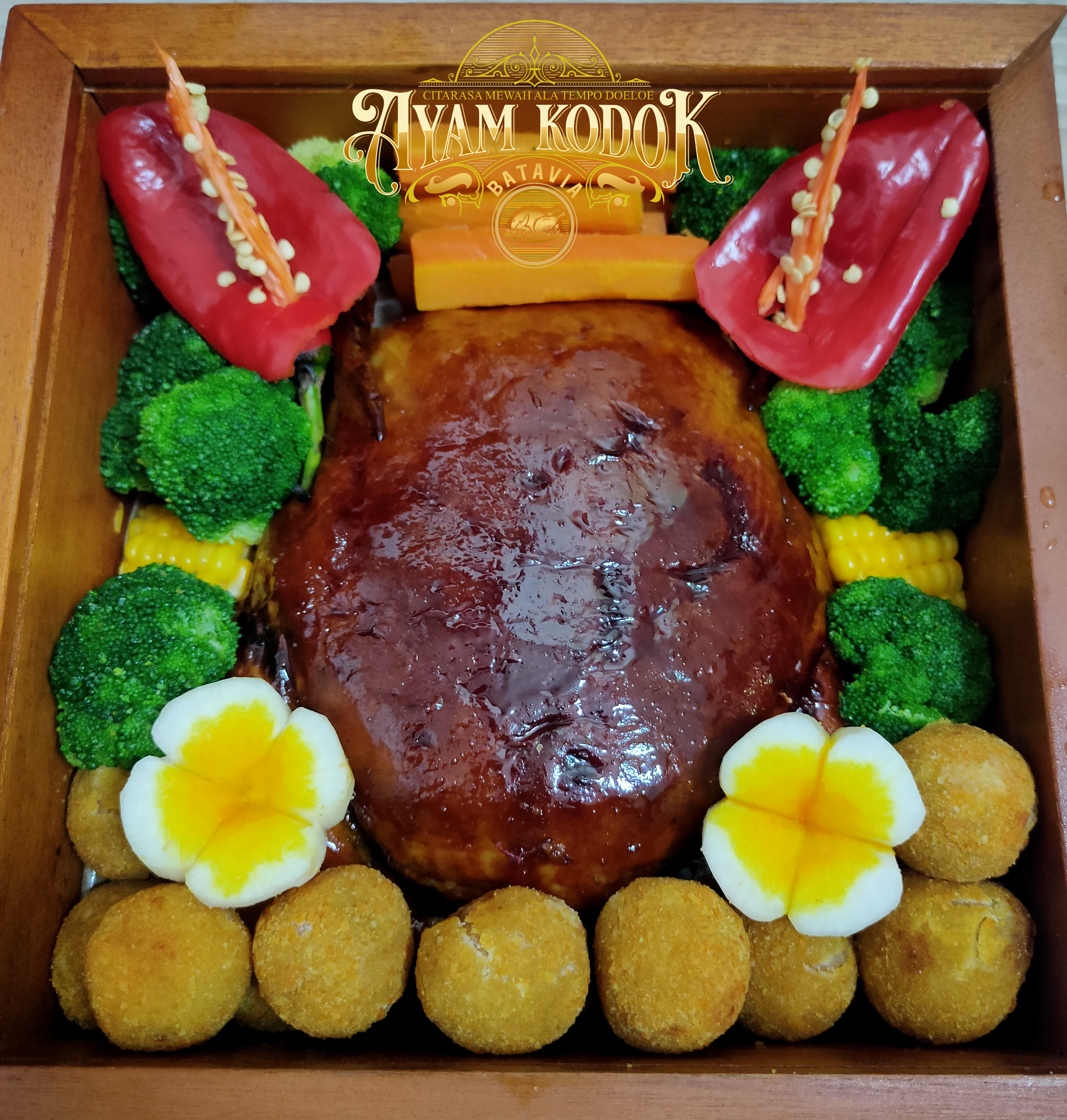
- Ayam Kodok (Indonesian Stuffed Chicken)
- Place of origin: Indonesia
- Region or state: Nationwide
- Main ingredients: Chicken

Ayam kodok (lit. 'frog chicken' in Indonesian) is an Indonesian stuffed and roasted chicken, commonly served as a holiday staple during Christmas and other special occasions. The dish dates back to the colonial era, likely related to gevulde kip, the Dutch stuffed chicken dish.

== Preparation ==
Ayam kodok preparation requires deboning a chicken, and then stuffing it with ground chicken meat with beef or pork, spices, vegetables, and hard boiled eggs. The chicken is then optionally steamed before it is roasted.

== See also ==
- Ayam goreng
- Ayam bakar
- List of chicken dishes
