= Selat solo =

Indonesian beefsteak dish

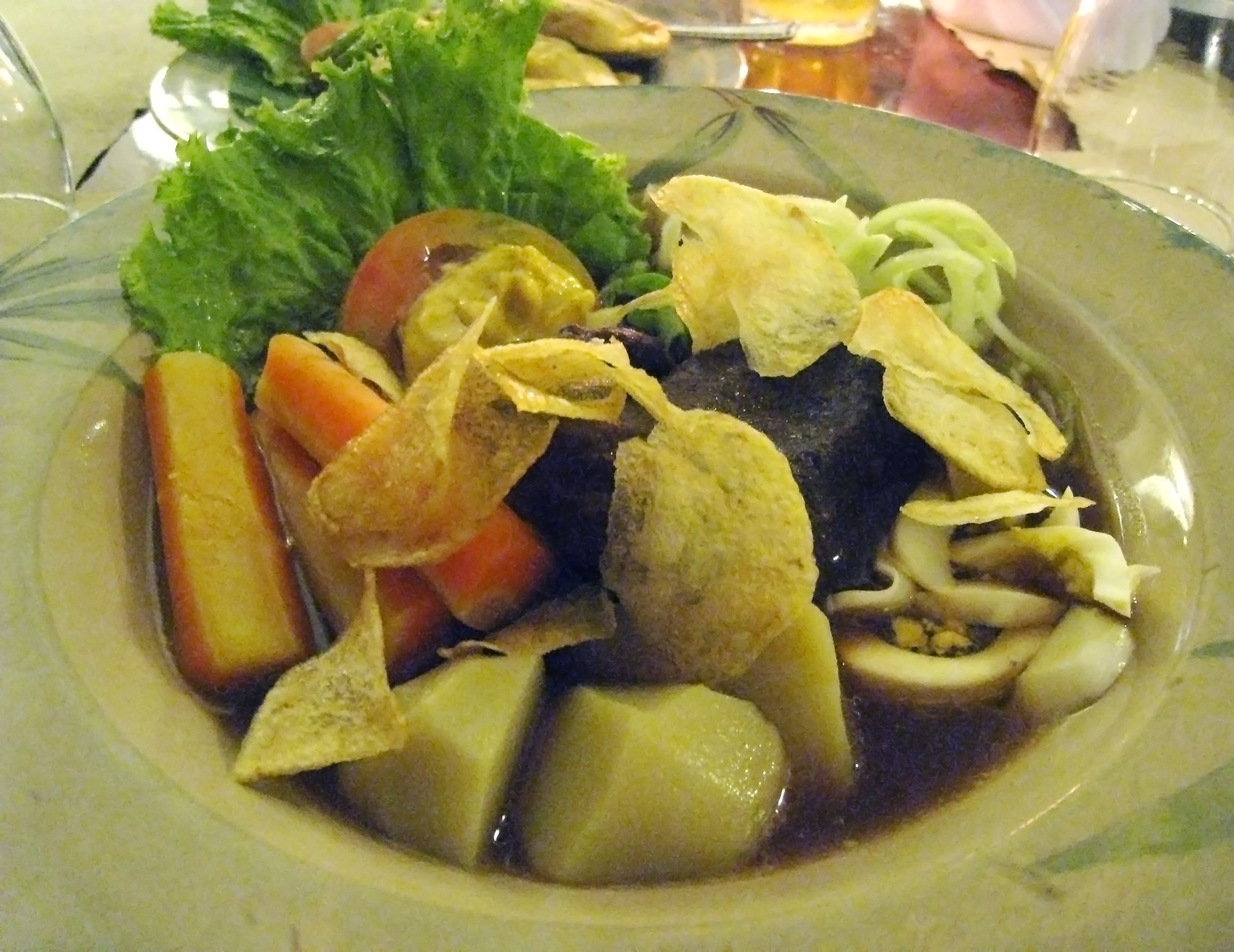
- Selat Solo
- Course: Main course
- Place of origin: Indonesia
- Region or state: Central Java
- Serving temperature: Hot
- Main ingredients: Braised beef tenderloin served in thin watery sauce, served with vegetables and potato

Selat solo (Javanese for: "Solo salad") is a Javanese dish influenced by Western cuisine; it is a specialty of Solo city, Central Java, Indonesia. It consists of braised beef tenderloin served in thin watery sauce made from a mixture of garlic, vinegar, kecap manis (sweet soy sauce), Worcestershire sauce, water, and spiced with nutmeg and black pepper. It is served with hard boiled egg and vegetables such as string beans, potato, tomato, lettuce, cucumber, cauliflower or broccoli and carrot, and topped with potato chips and some dash of mustard, hollandaise or sauce gribiche on the side.

Despite its Javanese name—Selat Solo—that denote "salad", its centerpiece is the chunk of beef (preferably tenderloin) that makes this dish hardly a salad, it is more likely to be categorized as a type of braised beef steak in Javanese mildly sweet watery sauce. Some might describe this dish as the cross-over between beefsteak, salad and soup. This dish sometimes also called as Bistik Jawa (Javanese beefsteak), although Javanese beefsteak could refer to another similar dish with less watery sauce.

== History ==
During colonial Dutch East Indies era, European colonizers brought with them European ingredients and their cooking technique. Some of Javanese upperclass ningrat (nobles) and educated native Javanese were exposed to European cuisine; such as breads, cheeses and beefsteak, this cuisine was held in high esteem as the cuisine of the upper class of Dutch East Indies society. This led to adoption and fusion of European cuisine into local Javanese cuisine, such as the development of Selat Solo recipe in Surakarta, the heart of Javanese court of Surakarta Sunanate. It is believed that the recipe was the fusion; a local Javanese adoption of European beefsteak. The trace of European influence can be seen in the use of mustard or hollandaise and Worcestershire sauce, while the Javanese preference of mild sweetness can be tasted in the use of kecap manis (sweet soy sauce).

== See also ==
- Javanese cuisine
- Gado gado
