= Toko (shop) =

Indonesian shop

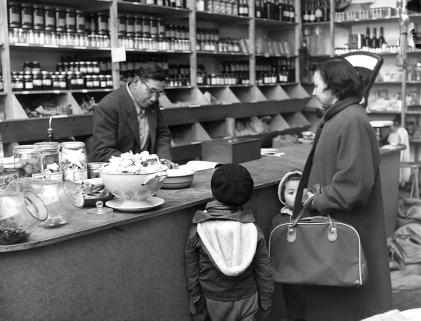
Toko in Amsterdam (1956)

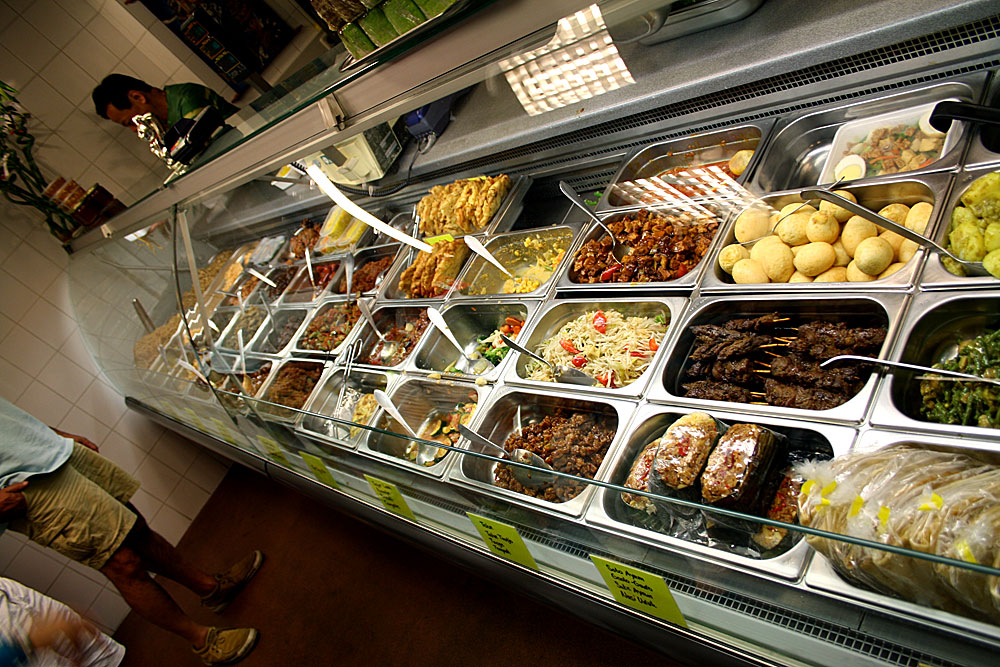
Indo toko with Indonesian dishes on display in Amsterdam (2011)

A toko (Indonesian for shop) is a kind of retail shop in Indonesia and the Netherlands. The term is of Indonesian origin refer to a shop. In Indonesia, the term toko is used as a generic name for any kind of established shop or store. For example, in Indonesia, toko roti means a bakery while a toko kelontong sells daily necessities. In the Netherlands, the meaning has shifted more specifically to refer to Asian shops and takeaway restaurants, which sell mainly Asian food products of which the owners are generally Indo, Native Indonesian and Surinamese.

== History ==
Tokos as a place of commerce emerged in present-day Indonesia during the Dutch East Indies era, where many shophouses (rumah toko in Indonesian) were run by local Chinese sellers in major cities such as Batavia.

Tokos have become a common type of shop in Dutch cities since the repatriation of Dutch colonial expats and Indo-Europeans during and after the Indonesian revolution in the late 1940s and early 1950s. Tokos originally sold products from the former Dutch East Indies (now Indonesia).

In the Dutch language, the word toko has become an informal name for any type of company or organisation.

The Indonesian e-commerce company Tokopedia takes its name from combining toko with an encyclopedia.

== See also ==
- Asian supermarket
- Warung, another smaller kind of eatery or shop in Indonesia
- Sari-sari store, a type of small variety store in the Philippines
