= Lumpia goreng =

Indonesian spring roll

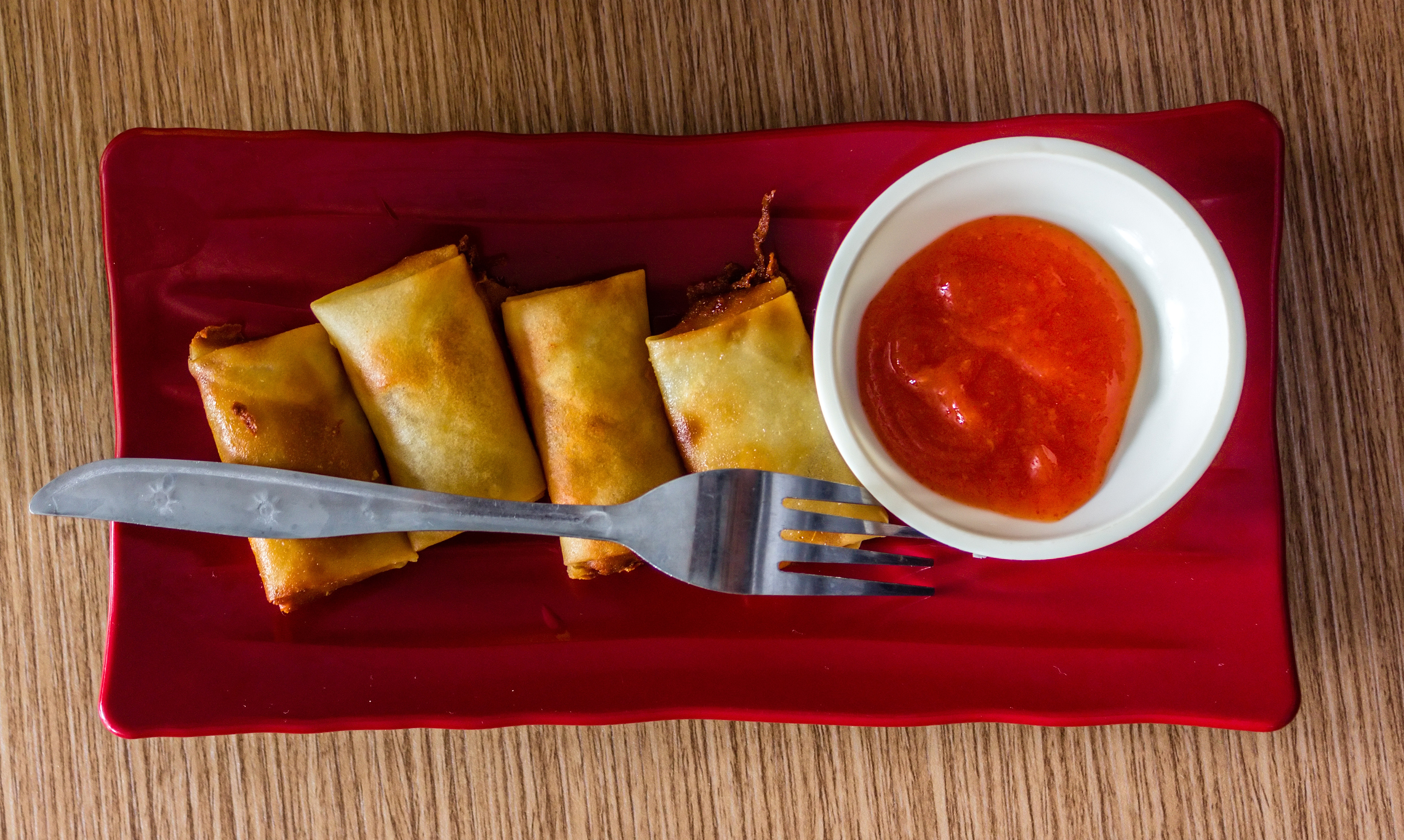
- A plate of lumpia goreng
- Type: Spring roll, kue
- Course: Appetizer or snack
- Place of origin: Indonesia
- Region or state: Java
- Created by: Javanese in the country
- Serving temperature: hot, warm

Lumpia goreng is a simple Indonesian fried spring roll filled with vegetables. The spring roll wrappers are filled with chopped, matchstick-sized carrots, shredded cabbage, and sometimes mushrooms.

Although usually filled only with vegetables, the fried spring rolls might also be filled with minced beef, chicken, or prawns.

In Indonesia, lumpia goreng is usually considered a snack food (gorengan).

== See also ==
- Cuisine of Indonesia
- List of Indonesian snacks
- Lumpia
  - Lumpia semarang
  - Sumpia
- Spring roll
