= Krupuk =

Southeast Asian deep fried crackers

Krupuk Keropok Kropek
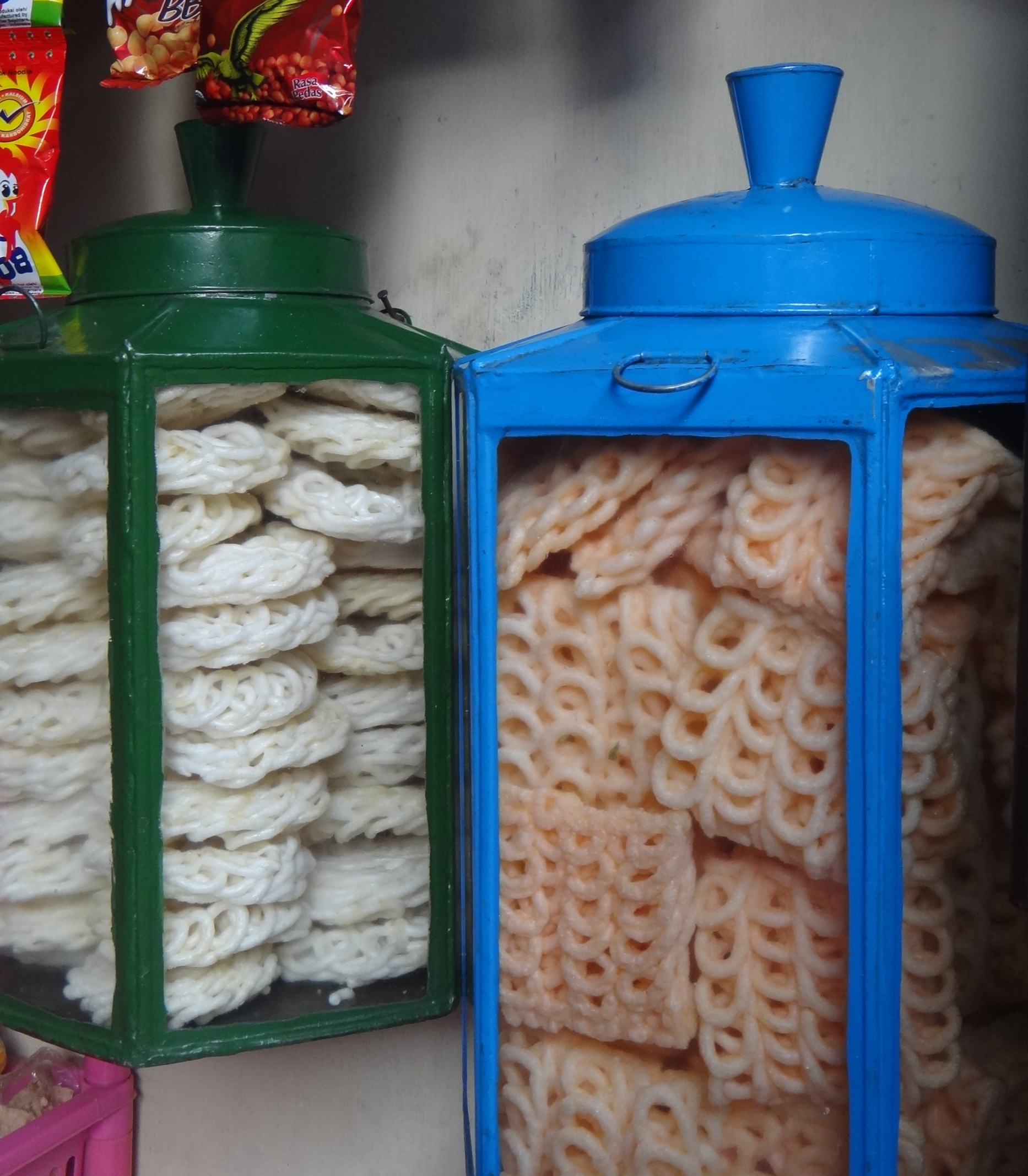
- Kerupuk, also known as keropok or kropek, stored in air-tight tin containers to preserve freshness and crispness
- Alternative names: Kerupuk
- Course: Snack
- Place of origin: Maritime Southeast Asia
- Region or state: Indonesia, Malaysia, the Philippines, southern Thailand, Brunei and Singapore
- Serving temperature: Room temperature
- Main ingredients: Starch, animal proteins, vegetables.
- Variations: Different variations according to ingredients

Krupuk (Indonesian pronunciation: [/kruˈpʊk/]), also known as keropok (Malay pronunciation: [/kəˈro.poʔ/]) and kropek (Filipino pronunciation: [/ˈkro.pɛk/]) refers to traditional deep-fried crackers made from starch combined with flavouring ingredients such as prawn, fish or other seafood. The food has long-standing traditions throughout maritime Southeast Asia and neighbouring coastal regions, particularly in Indonesia, Malaysia, the Philippines, southern Thailand, Brunei and Singapore.

Krupuk, keropok and kropek encompasses numerous regional varieties, ranging from cassava- or rice-based forms to those made with seafood or animal products such as cattle skin. These varieties are widely consumed as snacks, served alongside main dishes, or sold as regional specialities. Certain forms hold strong associations with local cuisines, including krupuk kulit in Java and Sumatra, keropok lekor in Malay Peninsula and amplang in Borneo.

Variants are also found internationally. In the Netherlands the food is known as kroepoek, reflecting historical ties with Indonesia, while in Suriname it forms part of Javanese-Surinamese cuisine. In global markets it is often sold as “prawn crackers” or “fish crackers.” Comparable preparations exist in Indochina (Vietnamese: bánh phồng tôm; Lao: ແຄບໝູ), southern China (Chinese: 虾片; pinyin: xiāpiàn) and other coastal areas of Asia, where drying and frying provided a practical method of preserving food resources.

== Origins ==
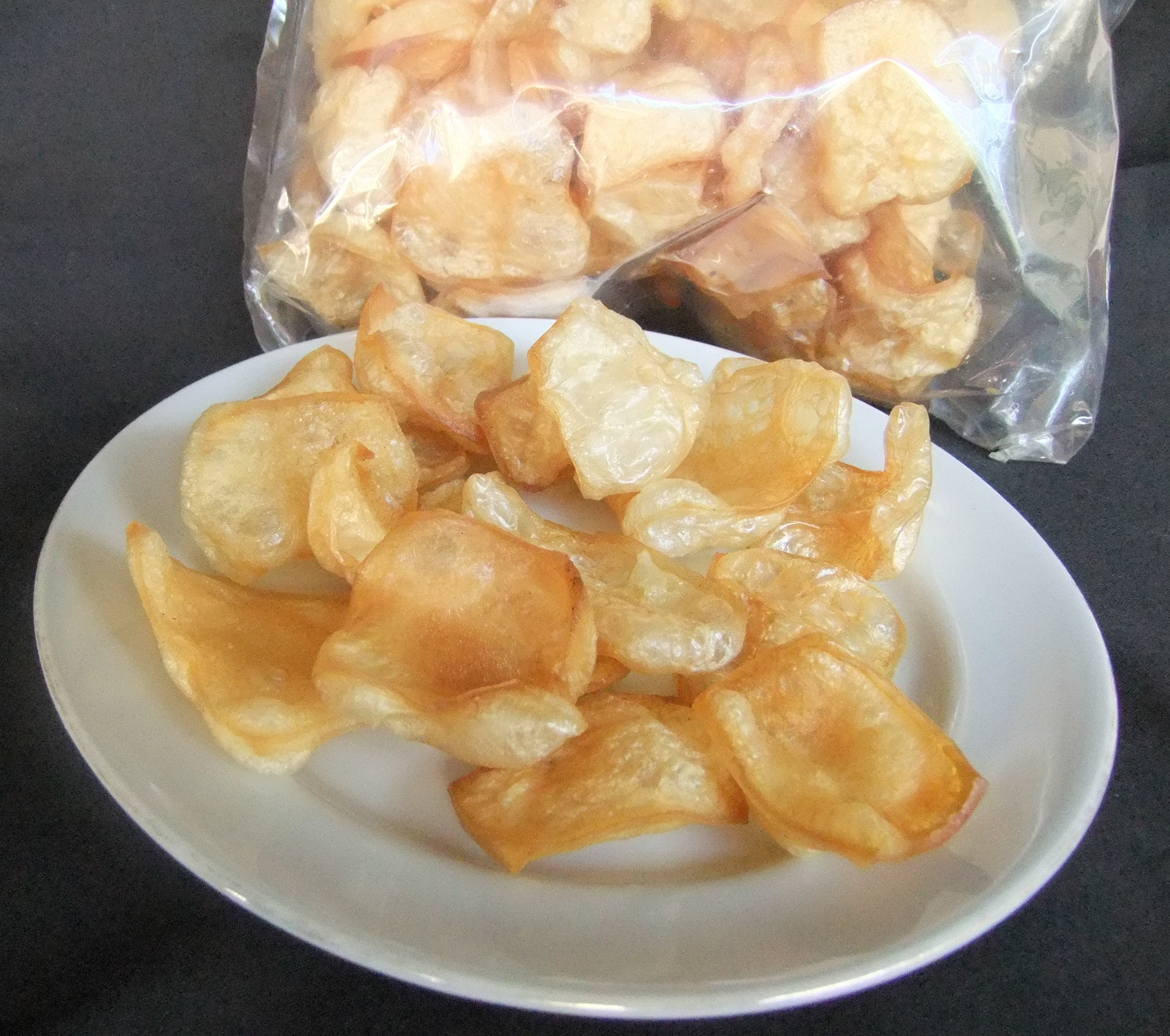
Kerupuk kulit, one of the earliest recorded forms of krupuk

=== Animal-based preparations in Southeast Asia ===
Early forms of such foods in the region are thought to have been made from animal skin, which could be preserved, dried and later fried for consumption. Across Southeast Asia, buffalo, cow and pig skins were traditionally kept for non-culinary purposes such as leatherwork or drum-making, while frying or roasting the skin as food represented a way of maximising the use of slaughtered animals in peasant or village settings where little was wasted. The technique of drying and rendering skin before frying, which causes it to puff when cooked, is believed to have developed independently in different regions, including in Thailand and Indonesia.

In Indonesia, historical sources suggest that krupuk was already known by the 9th or 10th century. The Batu Pura inscription mentions krupuk rambak, a cracker made from cow or buffalo skin that survives today as krupuk kulit, often served with the Javanese dish krechek. According to A. G. Pringgodigdo in the Ensiklopedi Umum, its preparation involved cleaning and boiling hides before slicing and drying them for later use. Similar skin-based crackers also appear in other regional traditions, such as the Sundanese dorokdok and the Minangkabau karupuak jangek.

=== Development of starch-based crackers ===
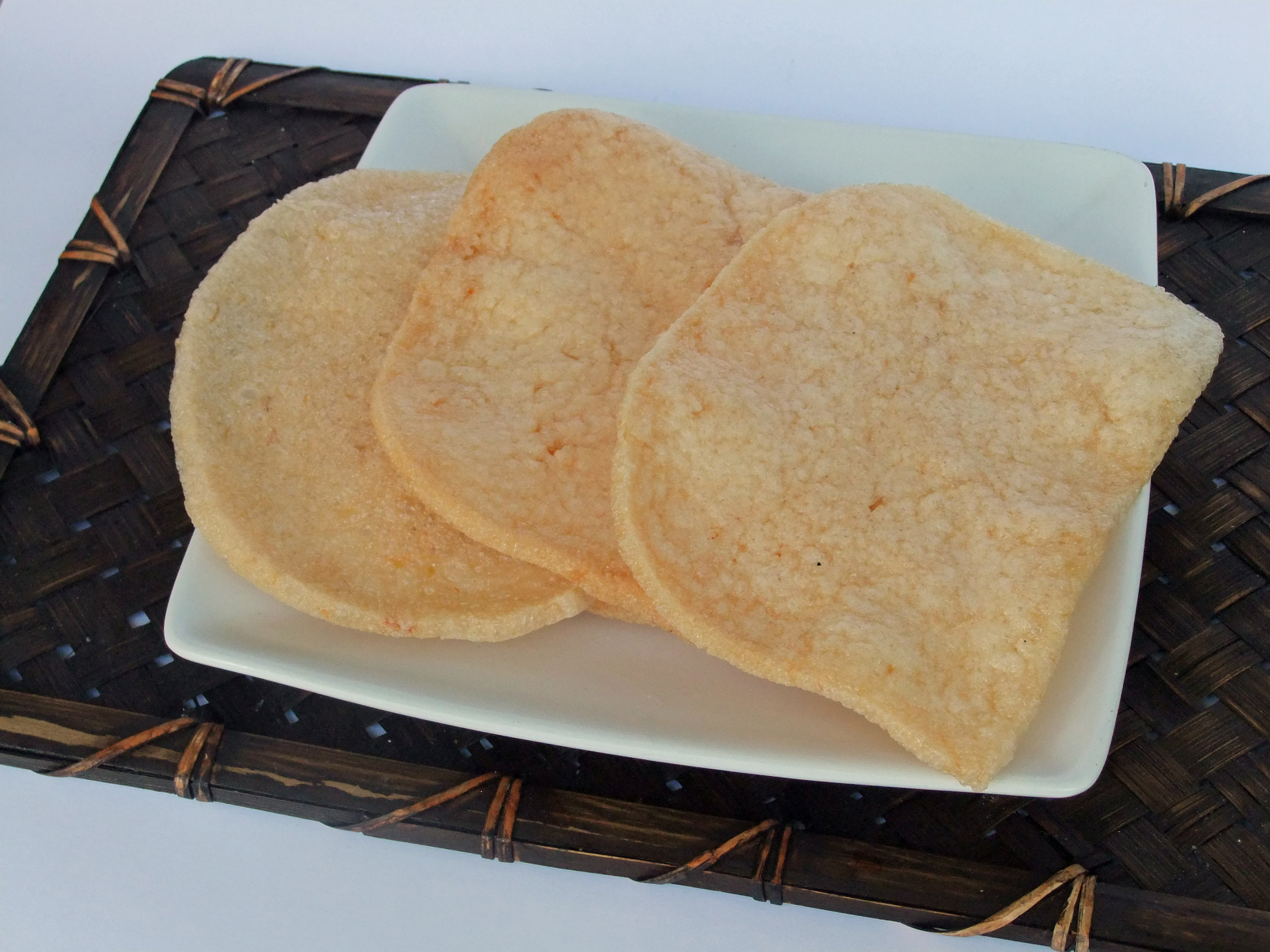
Fried krupuk udang, originally prepared using leftover prawn heads

Alongside these skin-based varieties, starch-based crackers developed as a distinct preparation method and eventually became the predominant form across Southeast Asia. Their emergence is often linked to broader food practices in Asia, where root crops, grains and seafood formed important components of the diet. Mixing starch with ingredients such as fish, shrimp or tubers and then drying the mixture provided a practical way to preserve and extend food resources, and similar techniques appear to have arisen independently in multiple parts of maritime and coastal Southeast Asia.

In the Malay Peninsula, local tradition traces the origin of keropok udang (prawn crackers) to the 16th century, when leftover prawn heads from a feast were used to prepare the first crackers. By the 19th century, keropok was documented by the Malay writer Abdul Kadir Munsyi, who noted its production in the Kuantan region. The tradition also extended to the Philippines, where a related preparation known as kropeck is believed to have been introduced through early contact with Malay communities prior to Spanish colonisation. Made from shrimp or fish paste combined with flour and dried before frying, it became a familiar snack and remains widely consumed.

In the Mekong Delta of Vietnam, bánh phồng tôm developed in areas where rice cultivation and shrimp farming were central to local livelihoods, with production in Sa Đéc becoming particularly prominent during the 19th-century Nguyễn dynasty. These showed close similarities to varieties found elsewhere in maritime Southeast Asia. Maritime exchange, especially through Hokkien and Teochew merchants, facilitated the spread of comparable preparations to southern China, particularly in Fujian and Guangdong, where shrimp paste and rice flour were combined to produce xiāpiàn.

=== Regional variations and spread ===
The development of keropok reflects a broader trend in which local variations of krupuk evolved across Southeast Asia, responding to the availability of cassava, sago, shrimp, fish and other protein sources. This diversity gave rise to numerous regional varieties throughout Sumatra, the Malay Peninsula, Java, Borneo, Sulawesi, Luzon, the Visayas and beyond, with established centres of trade and cultural exchange enabling the spread of ingredients and culinary techniques.

== Culinary profile ==
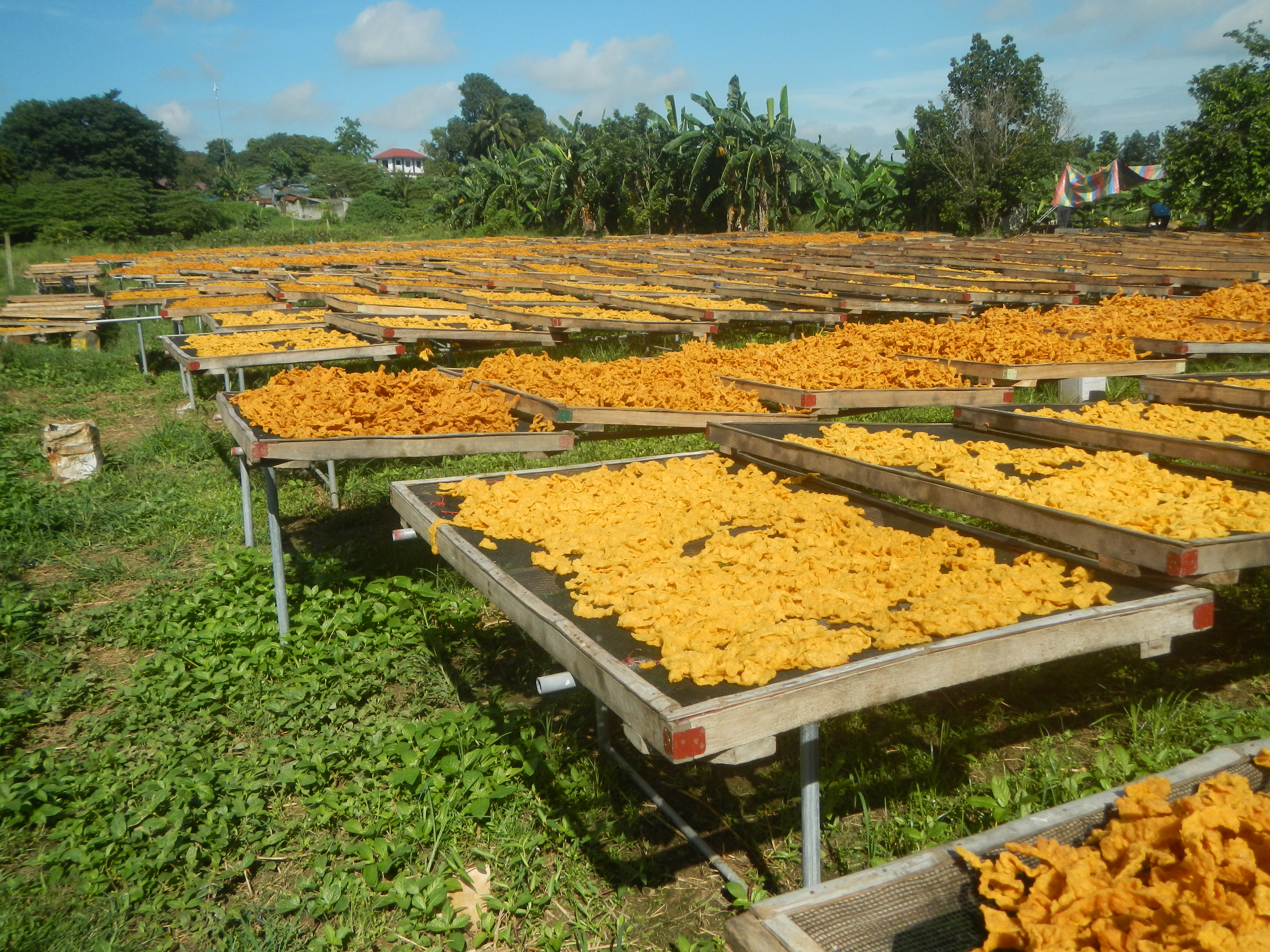
Kropek, in the process of being dried in the sun in the Philippines.

=== Preparation and culinary uses ===
Most varieties of pre-packaged raw krupuk require sun-drying before being deep-fried to achieve their characteristic crisp texture. They are typically cooked in a wok with hot oil, although alternative methods exist; for example, microwaving raw krupuk for about one minute at medium power (~700 W) can produce a lower-fat version. In its uncooked form, krupuk is small, hard, and darker in colour compared to its puffed, cooked state.

Krupuk and kripik may be eaten on their own as snacks or used as accompaniments to enhance the texture of various dishes. Certain types are commonly paired with preparations such as gado-gado, karedok, rujak, asinan, bubur ayam and certain varieties of soto. Krupuk is also the primary ingredient in seblak, a savoury and spicy preparation in which softened krupuk is stir-fried with meat or seafood in a chilli-based sauce.

=== Variations ===
==== Indonesia ====
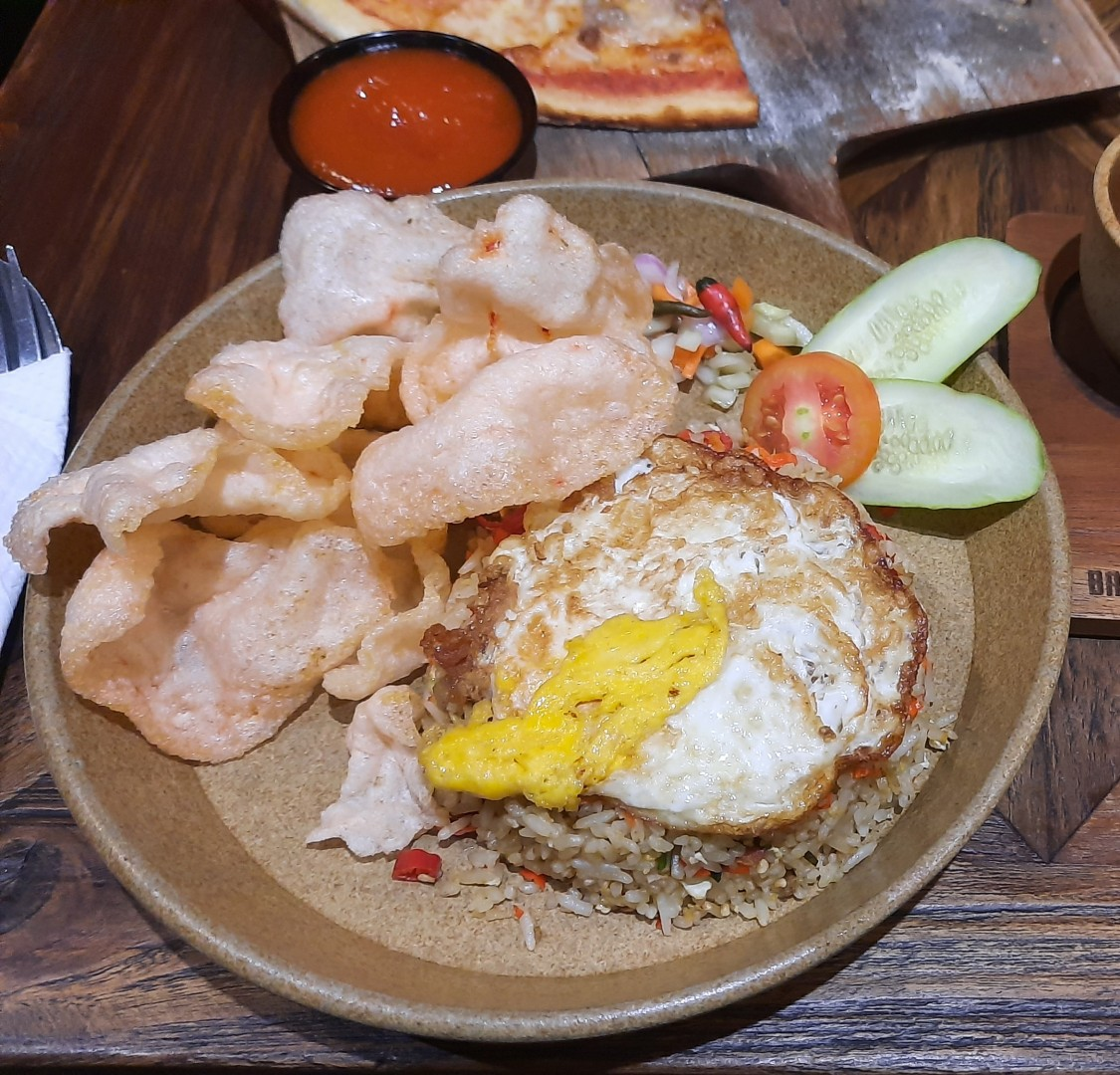
Nasi goreng served with kerupuk, a typical accompaniment that provides additional texture to the dish.

Indonesia has a wide variety of krupuk, with types found in almost every region. The most common are prepared from starch combined with seafood such as shrimp, fish or squid, while others make use of rice or animal products such as cattle skin. These preparations are consumed both as standalone snacks and as accompaniments to meals, reflecting regional preferences and available ingredients.

Among the most widespread types are krupuk putih or krupuk kampung, cassava starch crackers common throughout the archipelago and krupuk gendar, a rice-based cracker especially associated with Java. Seafood-based varieties include krupuk udang (prawn crackers), the most internationally recognised type, and krupuk ikan, widely produced in coastal centres such as Palembang, Bangka, Cirebon and Sidoarjo. Regional specialities also include krupuk kemplang from Palembang, amplang from Kalimantan and krupuk kupang, a clam-based cracker from East Java.

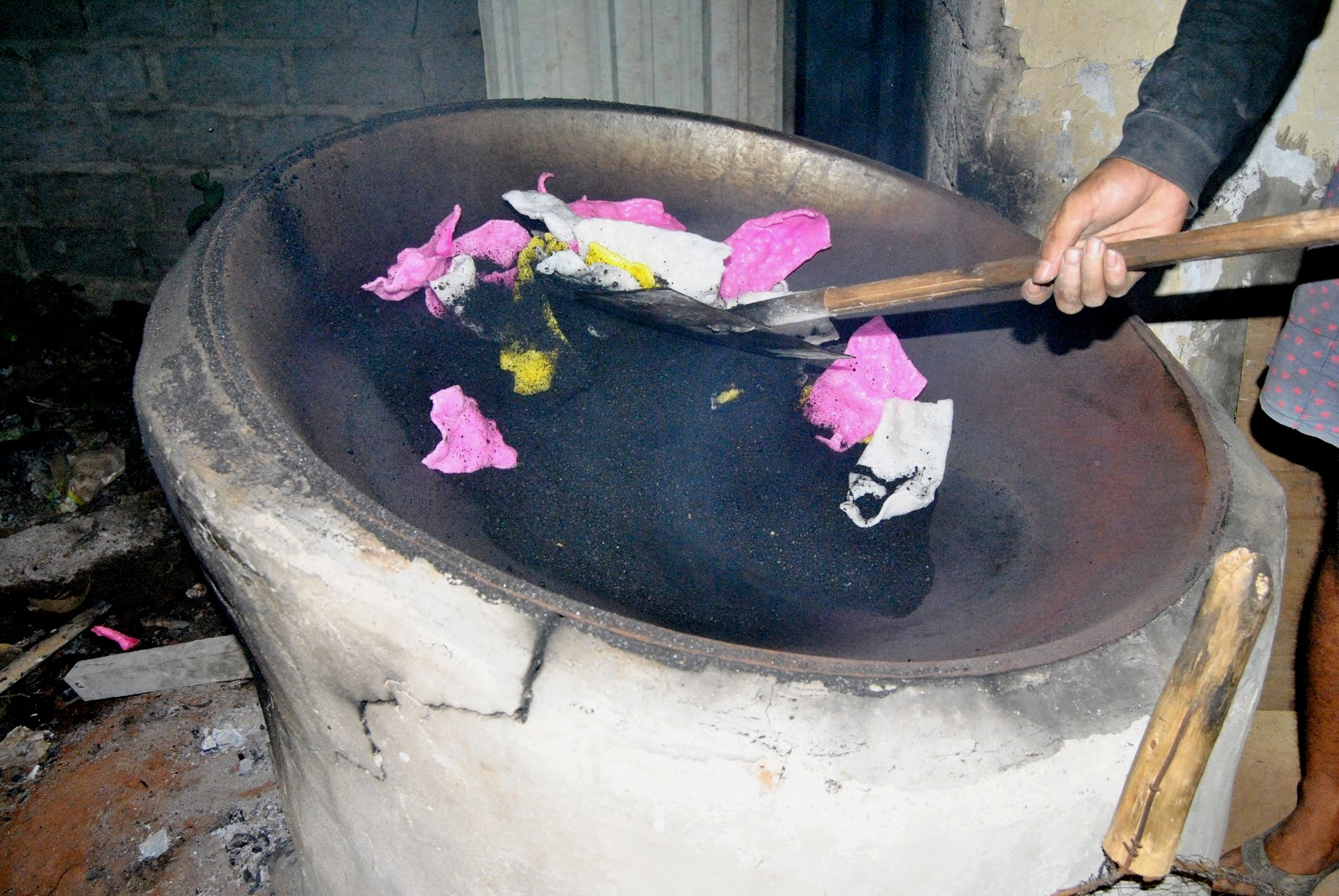
Krupuk melarat cooked in hot river sand

Other distinctive forms highlight cultural and culinary diversity. Krupuk kulit (rambak or jangek) is prepared from cattle skin and is especially popular in West Sumatra and Java, while krupuk kulit babi (pork rinds) are associated with non-Muslim-majority regions such as Bali, North Sumatra and North Sulawesi. Local innovations include krupuk melarat from Cirebon, roasted in clean river sand instead of oil, krupuk mie (noodle crackers) used as toppings for asinan, and speciality products such as krupuk petis from Kendal, krupuk telur asin from Brebes, and krupuk siput gonggong from the Riau Islands.

Apart from being a food condiment, there are several derivative foods made of krupuk, scilicet seblak, kerupuk banjur, and kerupuk sambel asem from West Java, also karupuak mie and karupuak jangek kuah gulai from West Sumatra.

==== Malaysia ====
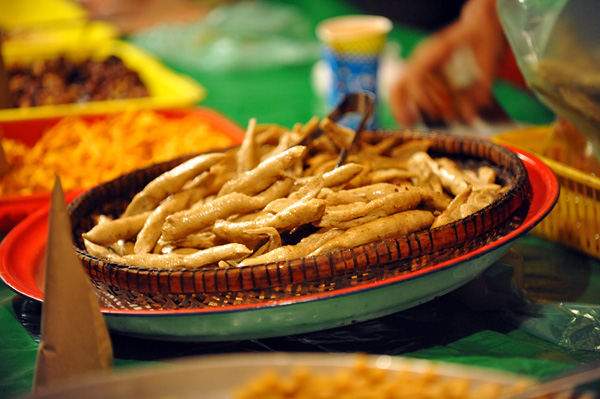
Keropok lekor, a traditional fish-based snack from Terengganu, Malaysia.

In Malaysia, keropok is most often associated with fish and other seafood, reflecting the country's coastal food traditions. It is widely available in markets and roadside stalls, eaten as a snack or served alongside meals, usually with dipping sauces such as chilli. Production is closely tied to fishing communities, where keropok has long formed part of local food culture and small-scale economies.

Among the many varieties, keropok kering is widely produced across different states and sold throughout the country, with common flavours including ikan tamban (sardine), ikan parang (wolf herring), udang merah (red prawn) and udang putih (white prawn). Distinct regional specialities include keropok lekor, a chewy fish cracker emblematic of Terengganu, is usually eaten freshly fried and is also known as keropok gote in Kelantan. Keropok sira refers to fish crackers coated in a sweet and spicy glaze, particularly associated with the east coast of Malay Peninsula. In Sabah, amplang is a popular nugget-shaped fish cracker characteristic of the coastal town of Tawau.

==== Thailand ====
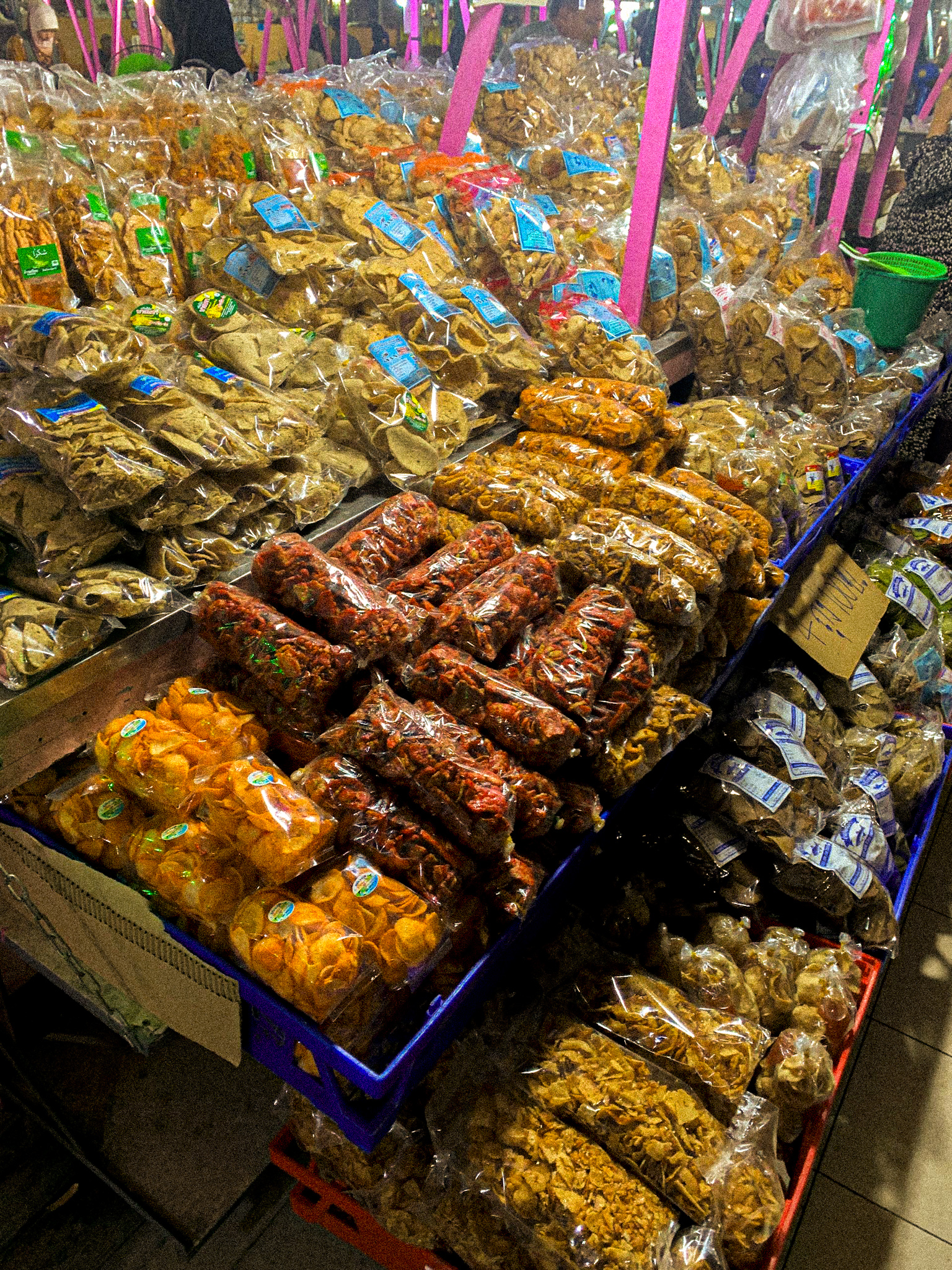
An assortment of Patani Malay–style keropok for sale at a market in Pattani, southern Thailand.

In the southern Thai provinces of Pattani, Yala and Narathiwat, fish crackers are locally known as keropok or krue po (Thai: กรือโป๊ะ). The product is traditionally associated with the Thai Malays and is produced primarily in coastal fishing communities. Similar to Malaysian keropok, it is made either as a chewy form (keropok lekor) or as dried slices (keropok keping) that can later be deep-fried. Preparation typically involves combining minced fish with flour, shaping the mixture into cylinders, boiling until firm and slicing. The product is distributed both as a common snack and as a regional speciality, with more than 200 small-scale producers active in the area.

==== Philippines ====
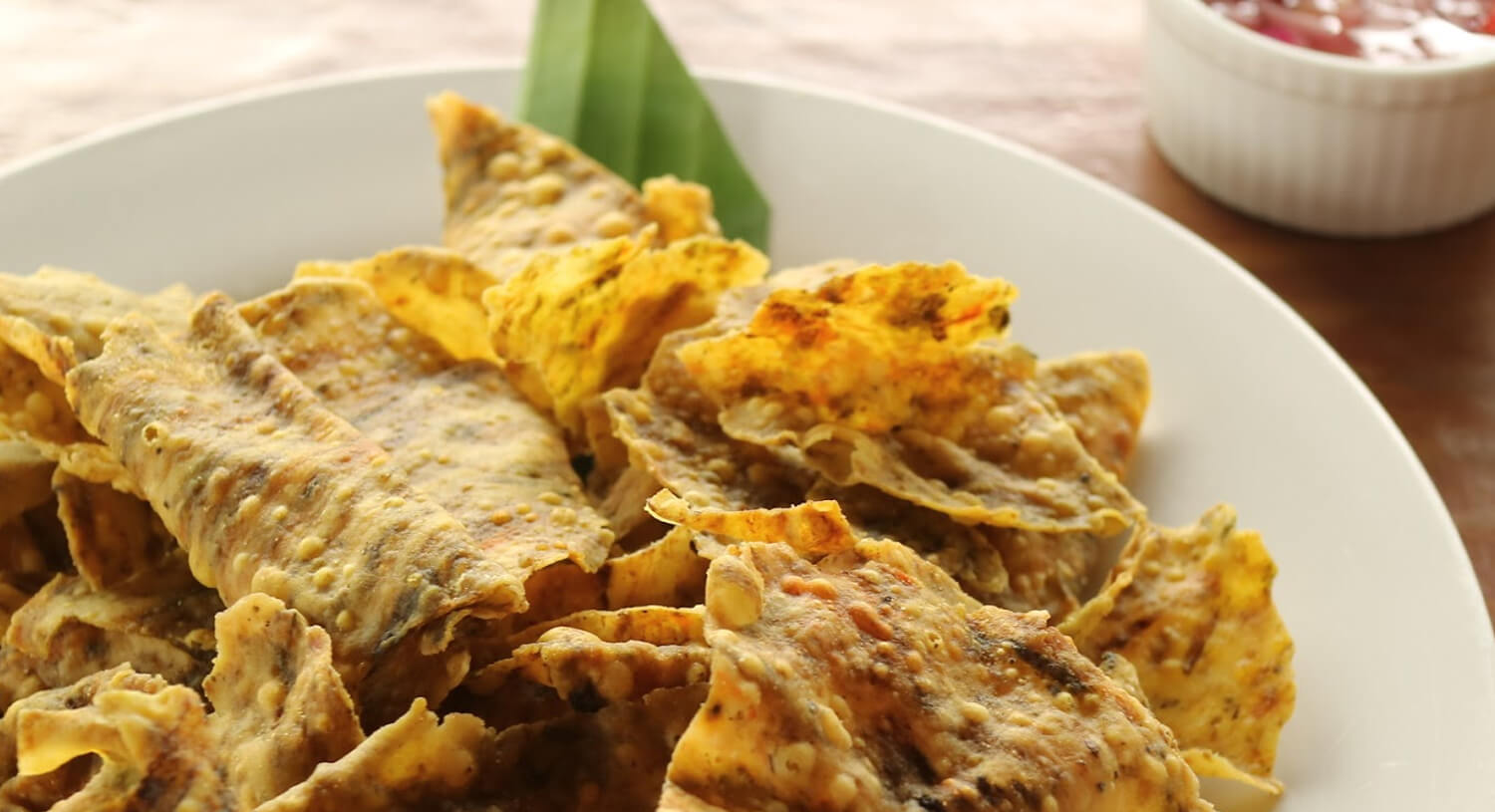
Tahong chips (mussel crackers), also known as tahong kropek, a regional variety of Filipino kropek made from mussels.

In the Philippines, the snack is more commonly known as kropek or kropeck. It is sometimes marketed in English as "fish crackers" or "prawn crackers", and less frequently compared with chicharrón, though the latter usually refers to fried pork or fish skin. While some commercially available vegetarian snacks made from tapioca starch or green peas resemble kropek, they are typically considered distinct products despite their similarities. Kropek is widely sold in small portions at neighbourhood sari-sari stores, as well as in larger bags at supermarkets and convenience shops.

Kropek is typically served as a light snack or appetiser, often accompanied by a vinegar and chilli dipping sauce, and is also consumed during social occasions or as a side dish with meals. Numerous local brands produce different varieties, among them La La Fish Crackers and Oishi, the latter being a Philippines-based snack food company that has expanded across Asia and become one of the region's major producers of prawn and fish crackers.

==== Netherlands ====
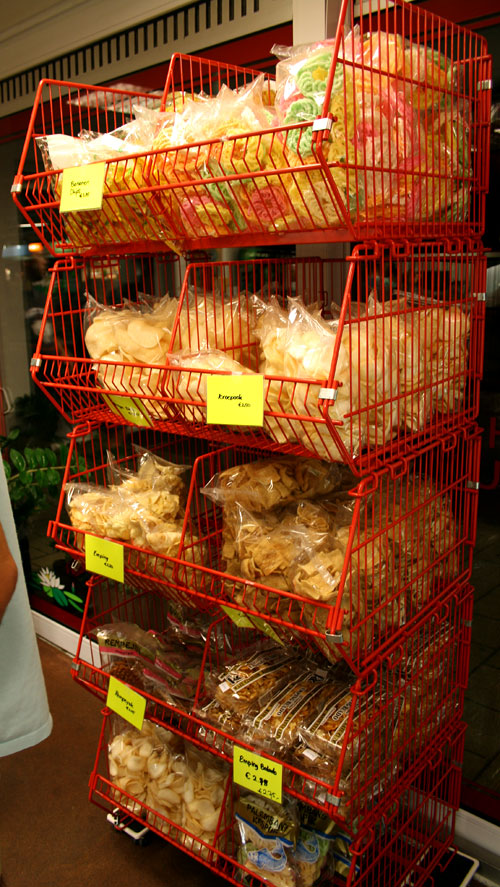
Assorted types of kroepoek on display for sale in an Indo (Dutch–Indonesian) toko in Amsterdam, the Netherlands.

In the Netherlands, kroepoek is commonly known as a familiar element of Indonesian and Indo-Dutch cuisine. It is widely available in supermarkets, Asian grocery stores (toko), and Indonesian or Chinese-Indonesian restaurants, where it is typically served as a side dish or snack. The most common variety is prawn crackers, sold both as dried slices for home frying and in ready-to-eat form. Commercial brands such as Conimex, along with imported products like Krupuk Udang Sidoarjo, have made kroepoek a well-integrated part of Dutch food culture.

==== Suriname ====
In Suriname, kroepoek is widely consumed as part of Javanese-Surinamese cuisine, introduced through Indonesian migration during the colonial period. It is typically served as a snack or as an accompaniment to meals. Common varieties include prawn crackers, cassava-based crackers and rempeyek, all of which are prepared in both household and restaurant settings.

== Gallery ==
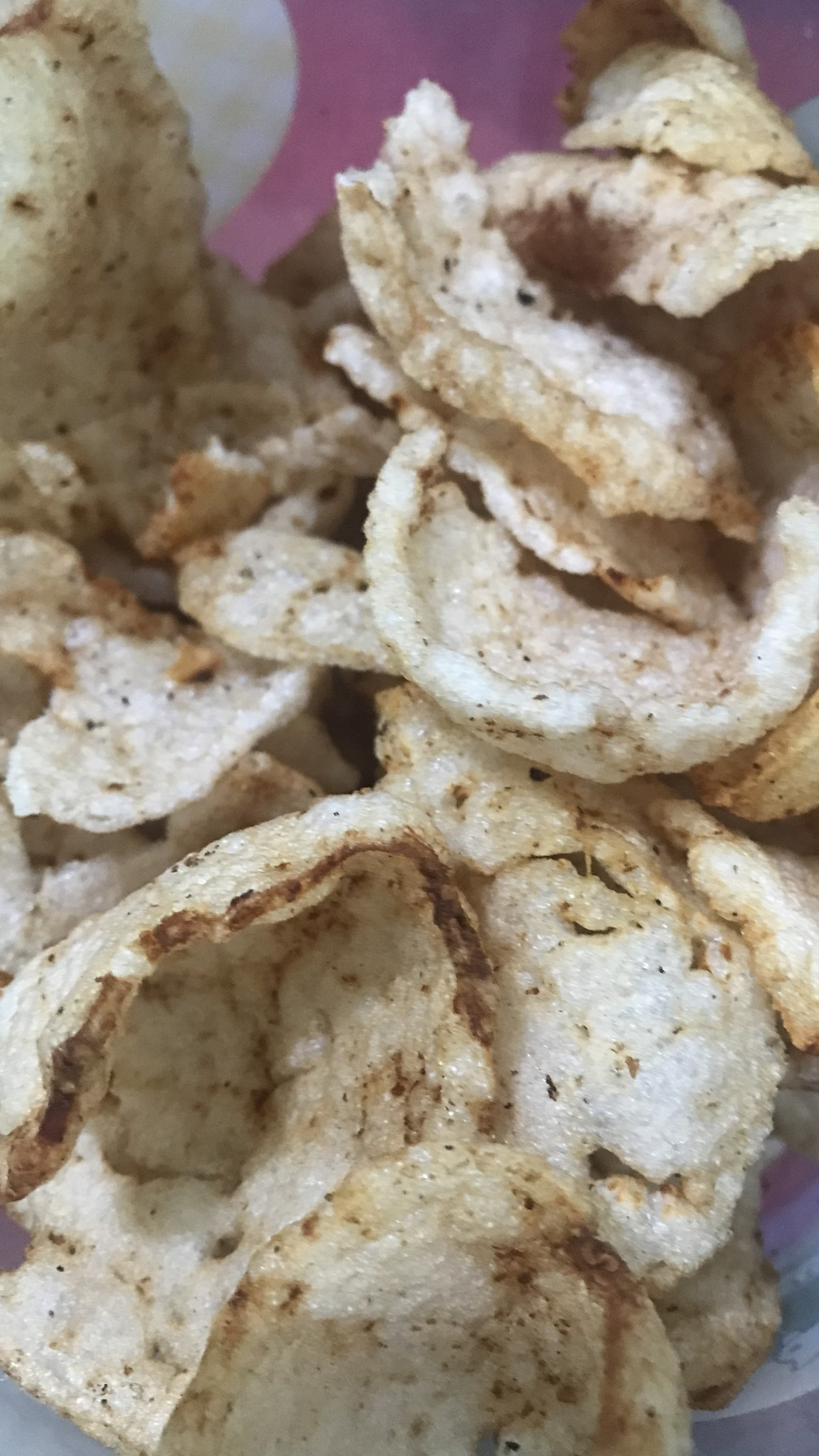
Krupuk petis

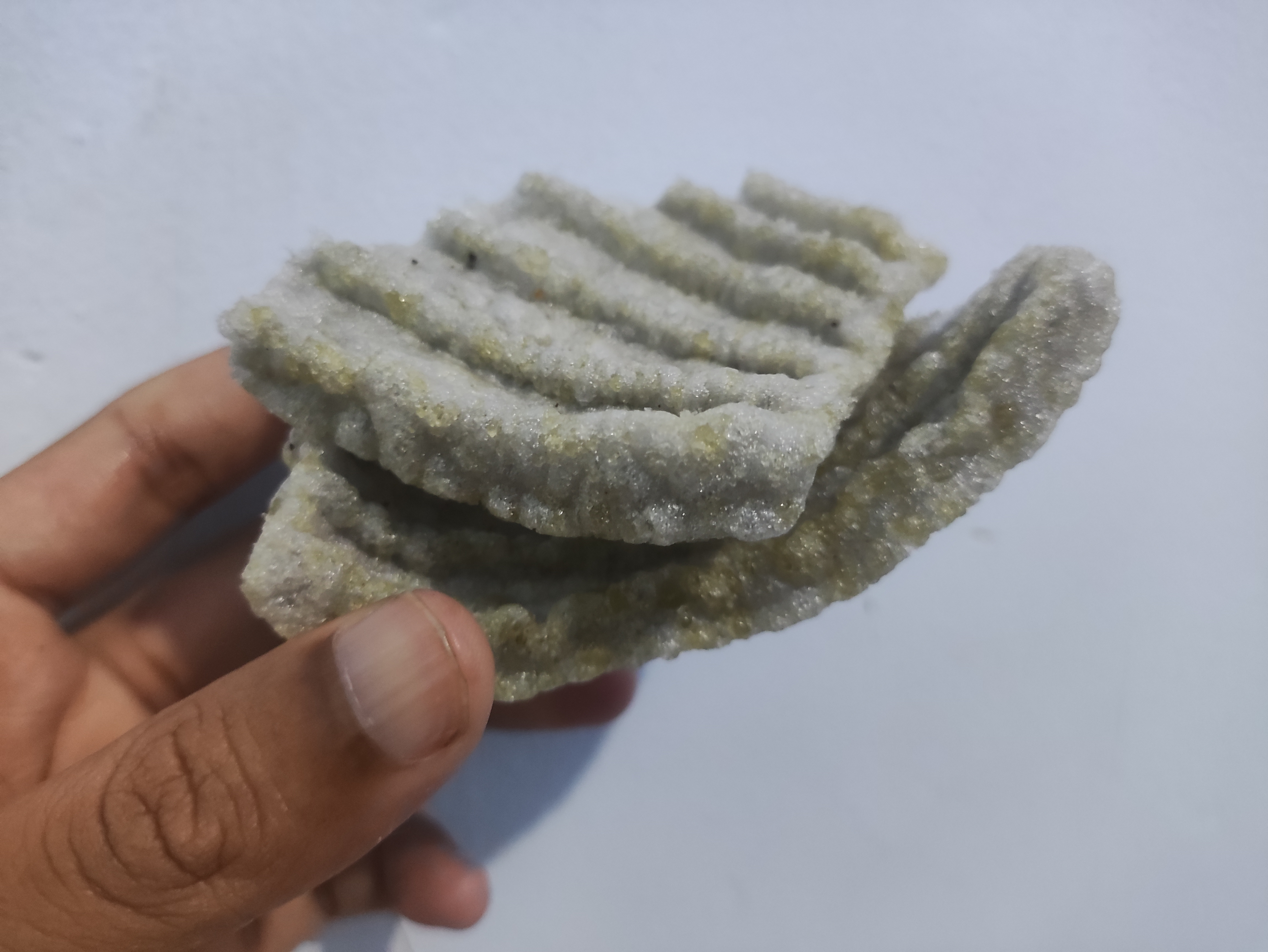
Kerupuk jengkol

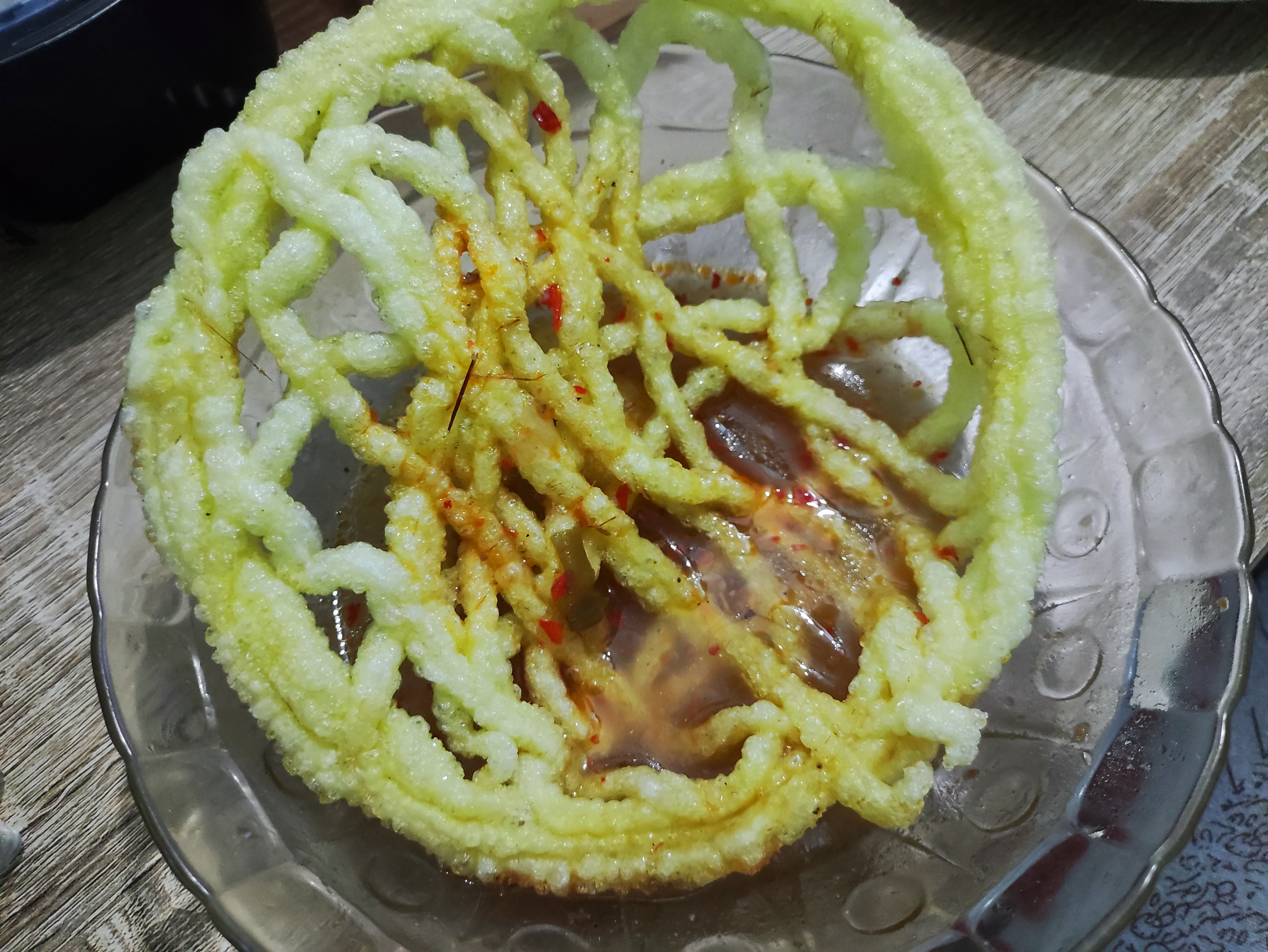
Kerupuk banjur

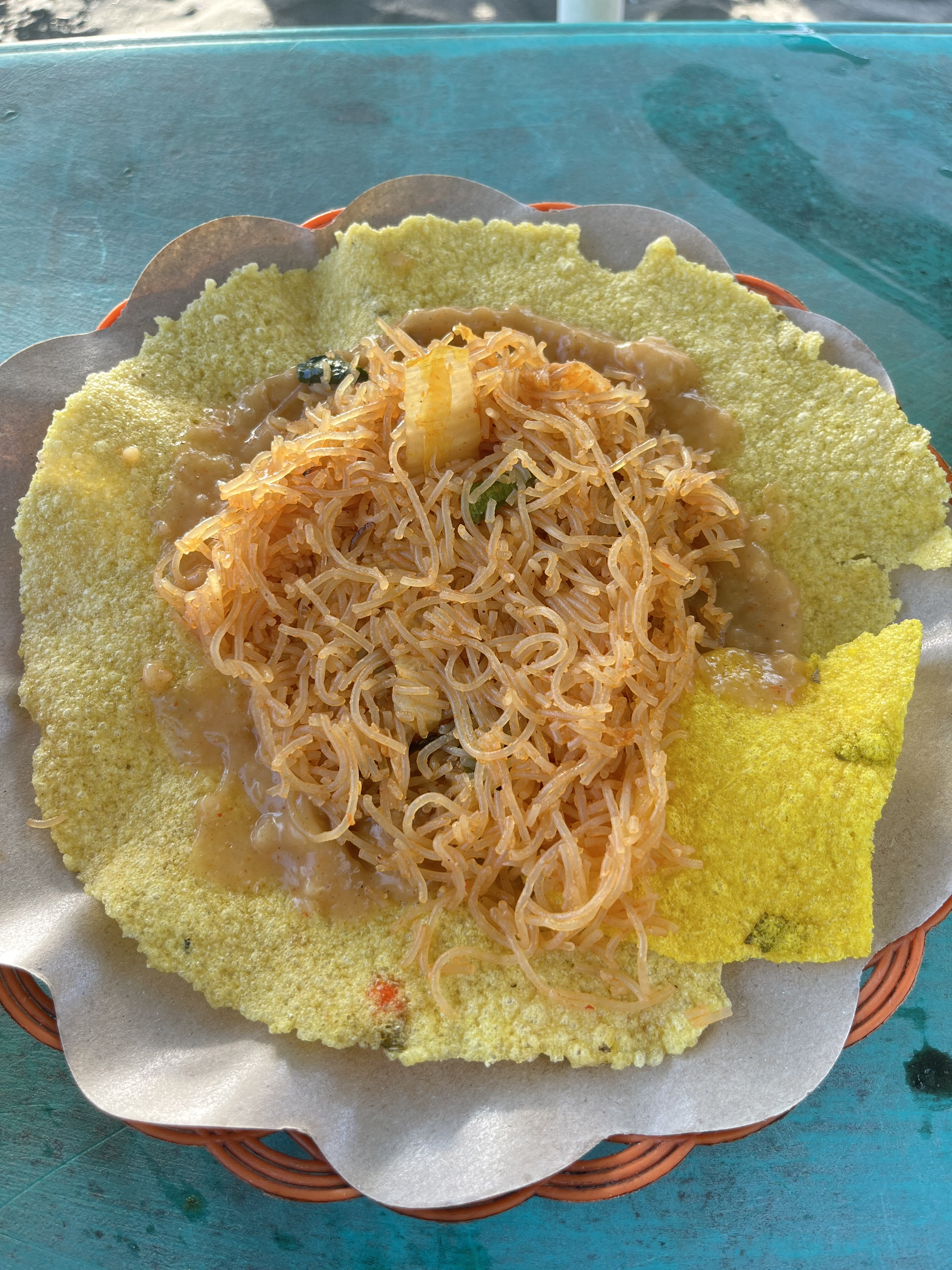
Karupuak mie

== See also ==
- Prawn cracker
- Fish cracker
- Kabkab
- Kiping
- Kripik
- Rempeyek
- Emping
- Seblak
- Duros
