= Lumpia semarang =

Indonesian spring roll

Lumpia Semarang
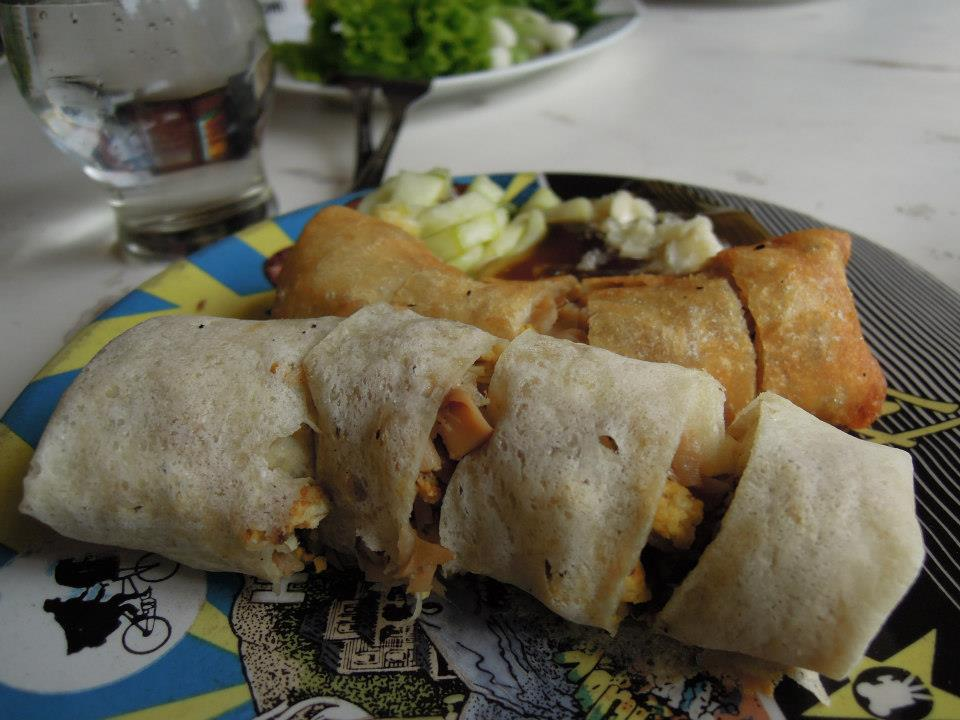
- A plate of lumpia semarang
- Type: Spring roll, kue
- Course: Appetizer or snack, sometimes main course
- Place of origin: Indonesia
- Region or state: Semarang
- Created by: Javanese and Chinese Indonesian in the country
- Serving temperature: hot, warm
- Main ingredients: lumpia wrapper, bamboo shoot, egg, dried shrimp, chicken meat and prawn

Lumpia Semarang or in old spelling known as loenpia semarang (Javanese: lunpiyah, Hanacaraka: ꦭꦸꦤ꧀ꦥꦶꦪꦃ, Pegon: لونبيياه) is an Indonesian appetizer or snack dish rollade-like consisting of rebung, egg, dried shrimp with chicken meat and/or prawn in a crepe-like pastry skin called "lumpia wrapper". Lumpia Semarang is a typical Lumpia the city of Semarang, the origin of this spring roll is from Semarang, Central Java.

Semarang lumpia is served either deep-fried or unfried, as the filling is already cooked.

== See also ==
- Cuisine of Indonesia
- List of Indonesian snacks
- Lumpia
- Sumpia
- Spring roll
- Seblak
