= Krupuk kulit =

Indonesian cracker dish

Kerupuk kulit
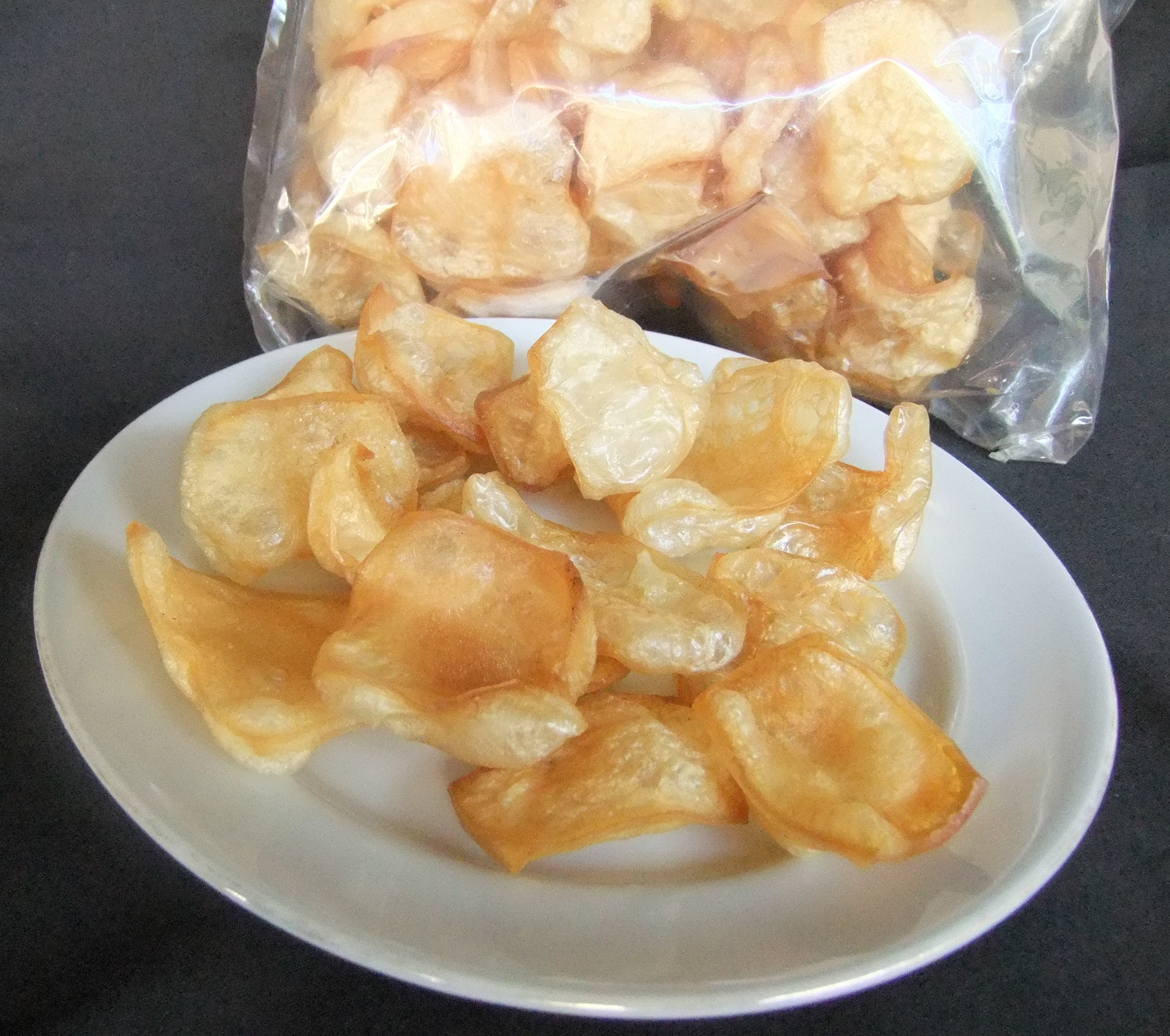
- Krupuk kulit
- Alternative names: karupuak jangek (Minangkabau) dorokdok (Sundanese) rambak (Javanese)
- Course: Snack and main course
- Place of origin: Indonesia
- Region or state: Nationwide
- Serving temperature: Room temperature
- Main ingredients: Cattle skin (cow or water buffalo), diced, sun dried, and fried in coconut oil

Krupuk kulit (Javanese: rambak; Sundanese: dorokdok; Minangkabau: karupuak jangek, lit. 'skin crackers') is a traditional Indonesian cattle skin krupuk (cracker). It is traditionally made from the soft inner skin of cattle (cow or water buffalo) which is diced and sun-dried until it hardens and loses most of its water content. The diced and dried skins are later fried in ample hot cooking oil until they expand similarly with bubbles and yield a crispy texture. This fried cattle skin is then sealed in vacuum plastic bags to ensure and prolong its crispiness.

== History ==
Krupuk rambak or krupuk made from cow or buffalo skin, is the oldest-mentioned krupuk variant in ancient Java. According to a culinary historian, krupuk has been around in Java since the 9th or 10th century, written on the Batu Pura inscription as krupuk rambak, which still exists today in Javanese cuisine, usually in krechek, a spicy stew.

== Serving ==
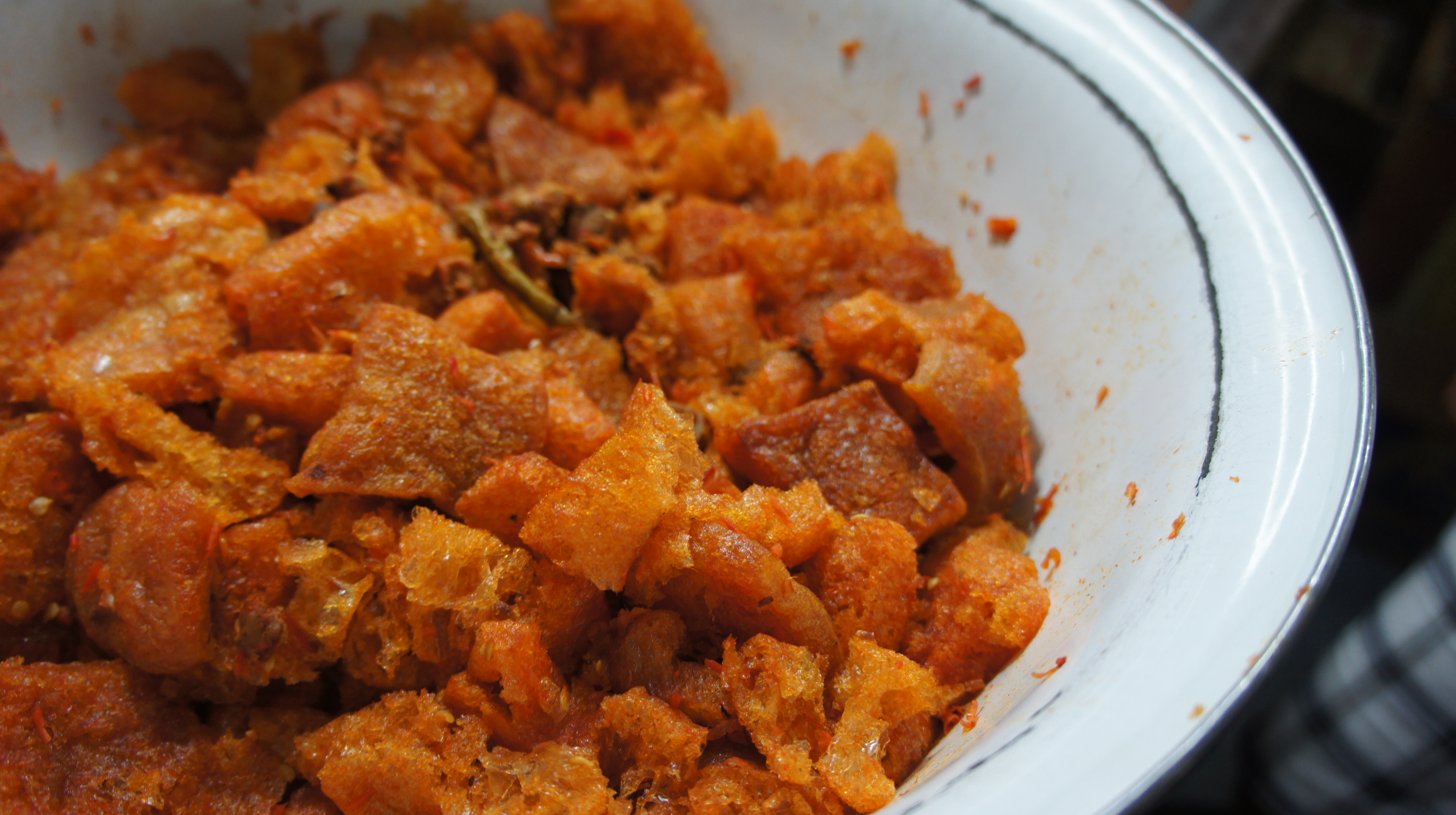
Javanese krechek made from krupuk kulit

Krupuk kulit is often served as a crispy snack to accompany main meals. In Padang restaurants, they are often offered as a side dish for nasi padang or sate padang, and often served with kuah gulai seasoning. In Java, krupuk kulit is the essential ingredient for krechek, a krupuk kulit dish in spicy coconut milk stew.

In addition to the crispy fried version, raw tapioca-based krupuk are also stir-fried to create a chewy snack called seblak. Seblak is served with vegetables, eggs, and chicken. The main spice ingredient in seblak is galangal.

== Variations ==
Most of krupuk kulit sold in Indonesia are made from cattle skin, either cow or water buffalo (kerbau). However, in some areas with large non-Muslim populations such as Bali, Batak lands, and some Chinatowns in Medan and other cities, pork skin krupuk kulit is also available. Compared to common cow skin crackers, kerupuk kulit babi (pork rinds) have a lighter colour and crumble more easily. There is also a variant that uses frog skin as krupuk kulit kodok.

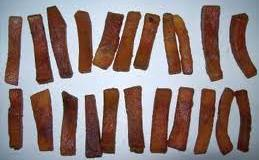
Raw unfried krupuk kulit

== See also ==
- Chicharrón
- Pork rinds
- Prawn cracker, a food of similar texture and appearance made of prawn and starch
- Krupuk
