= Kabkab =

Wafer made from ground cassava

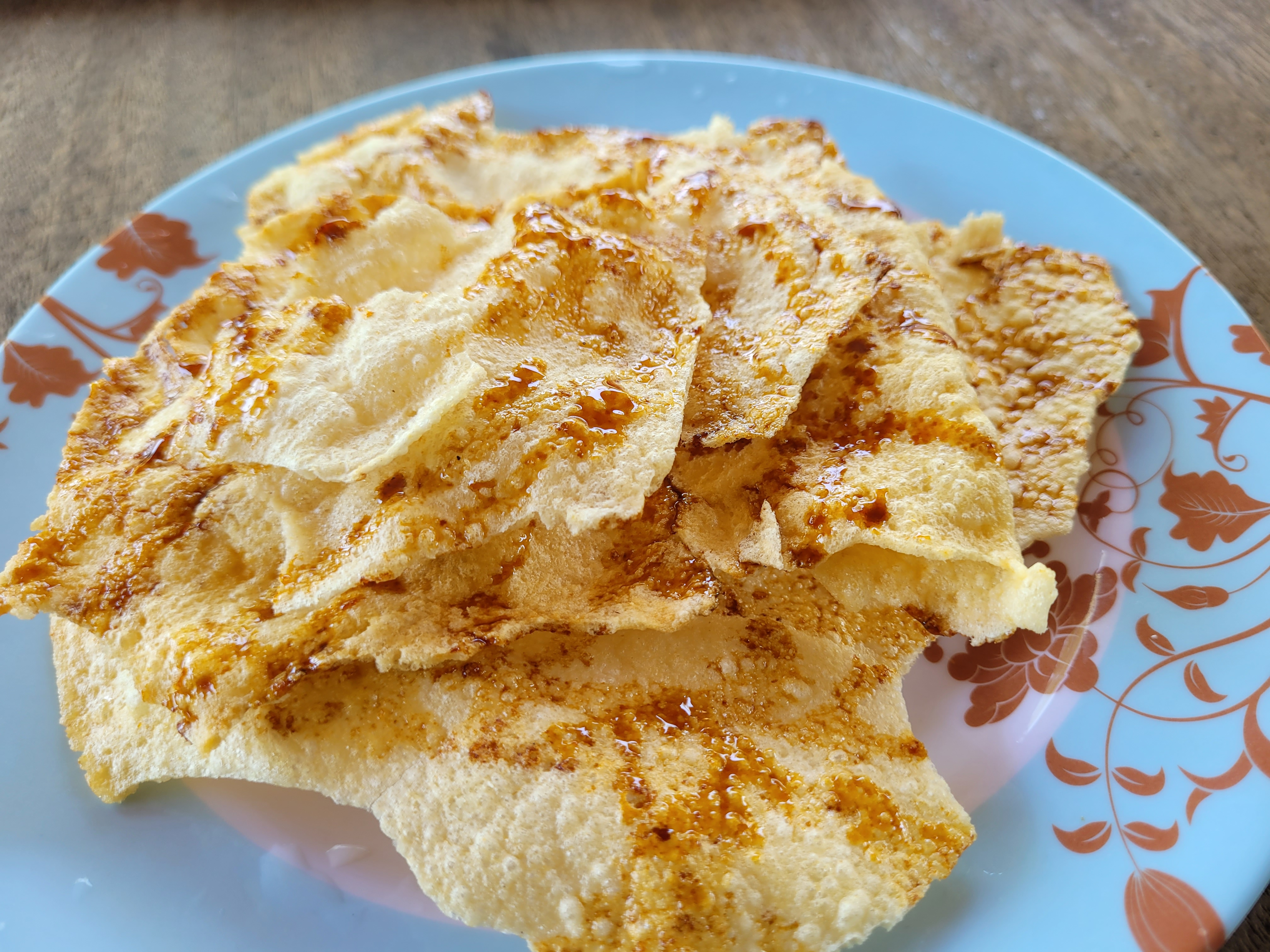
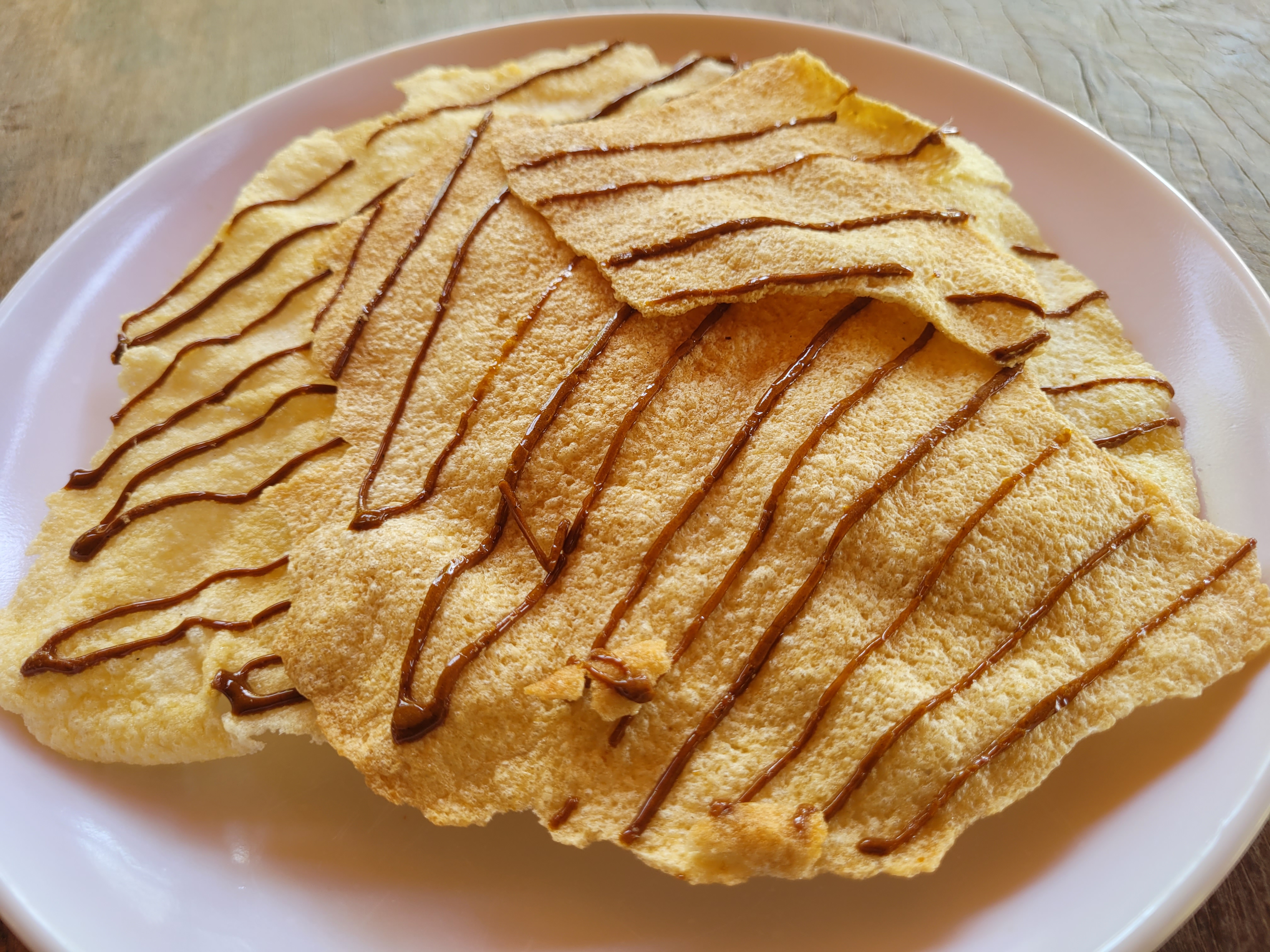
- Alternative names: Cassava crackers, Cassava crisps, Salvaro, Cabcab, Sitsarit, Saritsit, Kiping, Burikit, Piking
- Course: Dessert
- Place of origin: Filipino
- Main ingredients: cassava, latik

Kabkab, also known as cassava cracker or cassava crisp, is a traditional Filipino disc-shaped wafer made from ground cassava. It originates from the southern Philippines, but is most closely associated with the cuisine of Mindanao and the southern Visayas Islands.

== Other names ==
Kabkab is the name of the dish in most of the southern Visayas (derived from the common name of the oakleaf fern in Visayan languages). It is also known as salvaro in Cebu; kiping in Northern Mindanao, Camiguin, and Zamboanga del Norte; burikit in Dipolog and Zamboanga del Sur; piking in Palawan; and sitsarit or saritsit in Davao City and Davao del Sur.

== Description ==
Kabkab is made from finely mashed cassava tubers with a little salt and sugar. It is slathered thinly on banana leaves and steamed until the cassava pulp becomes translucent and paste-like. It is then air-dried or sun-dried until it becomes crisp and rigid. It can be stored for long periods in this form, up to several months. Before consumption, kabkab must be deep-fried until it becomes golden in color. It is usually eaten as a dessert, with a swirl of latik (coconut caramel) on top; but it can also be eaten with savory dips and salsas.

== Similar dishes ==
Kiping is also the name for a similar rice-based wafer from Lucban, Quezon.

== See also ==
- Barquillos
- Krupuk
- Kropek
