= Sumpia =

Indonesian traditional snack

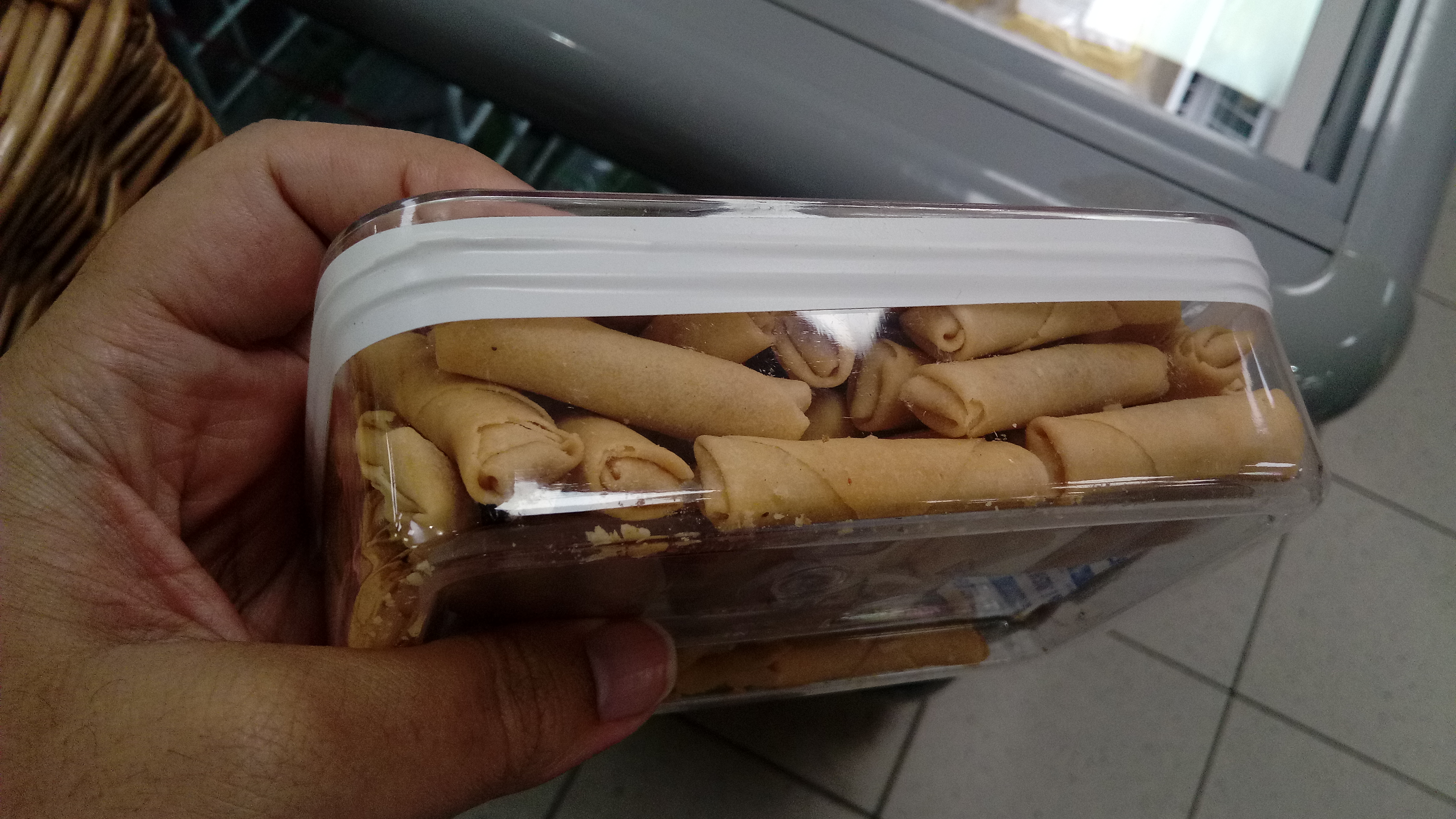
- A box of sumpia
- Type: Spring roll, kue
- Course: Appetizer or snack
- Place of origin: Indonesia
- Region or state: Indonesia and the Netherlands
- Main ingredients: lumpia wrapper, beef or prawn floss, coriander, lemon leaf, garlic and shallot

Sumpia (Javanese: ꦱꦸꦤ꧀ꦥꦶꦪꦃ, romanized: sunpiyah) is Indonesian traditional lumpia spring roll with much drier and smaller shape. Its diameter is about the same as human finger. Just like another Indonesian lumpia, sumpia consists of prawn floss as filling in a lumpia wrapper, spiced with coriander, lemon leaf, garlic and shallot.

In Indonesia, the most common filling for sumpia is ebi or dried shrimp floss.

== See also ==
- Cuisine of Indonesia
- List of Indonesian snacks
- Lumpia
- Lumpia semarang
- Spring roll
- Samosa
