= Kiping =

Filipino wafer made from glutinous rice

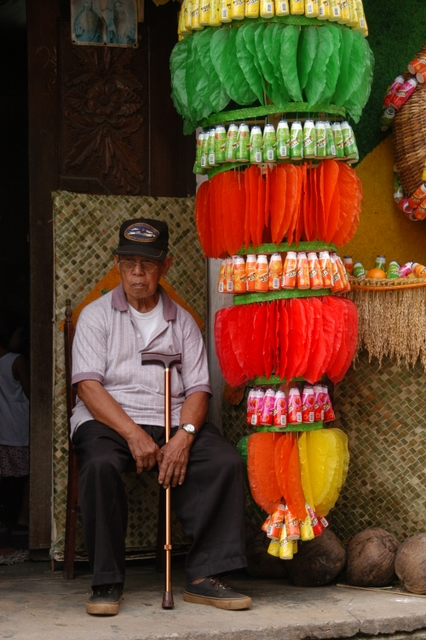
- An arangya, a lantern made from kiping wafers during the 2003 Pahiyas Festival of Lucban, Quezon
- Course: Dessert
- Place of origin: Philippines
- Main ingredients: glutinous rice
- Similar dishes: kabkab

Kiping is a traditional Filipino leaf-shaped wafer made from glutinous rice. It originates from the city of Lucban, Quezon. It is celebrated annually in the Pahiyas Festival. It can be eaten grilled or fried and can be dipped in sugar, vinegar, or other sauces.

== Etymology ==
The name kiping is an alternate form of kinipi, meaning "pressed", from the verb kipi, "to press dough to squeeze out the water".

== Description ==
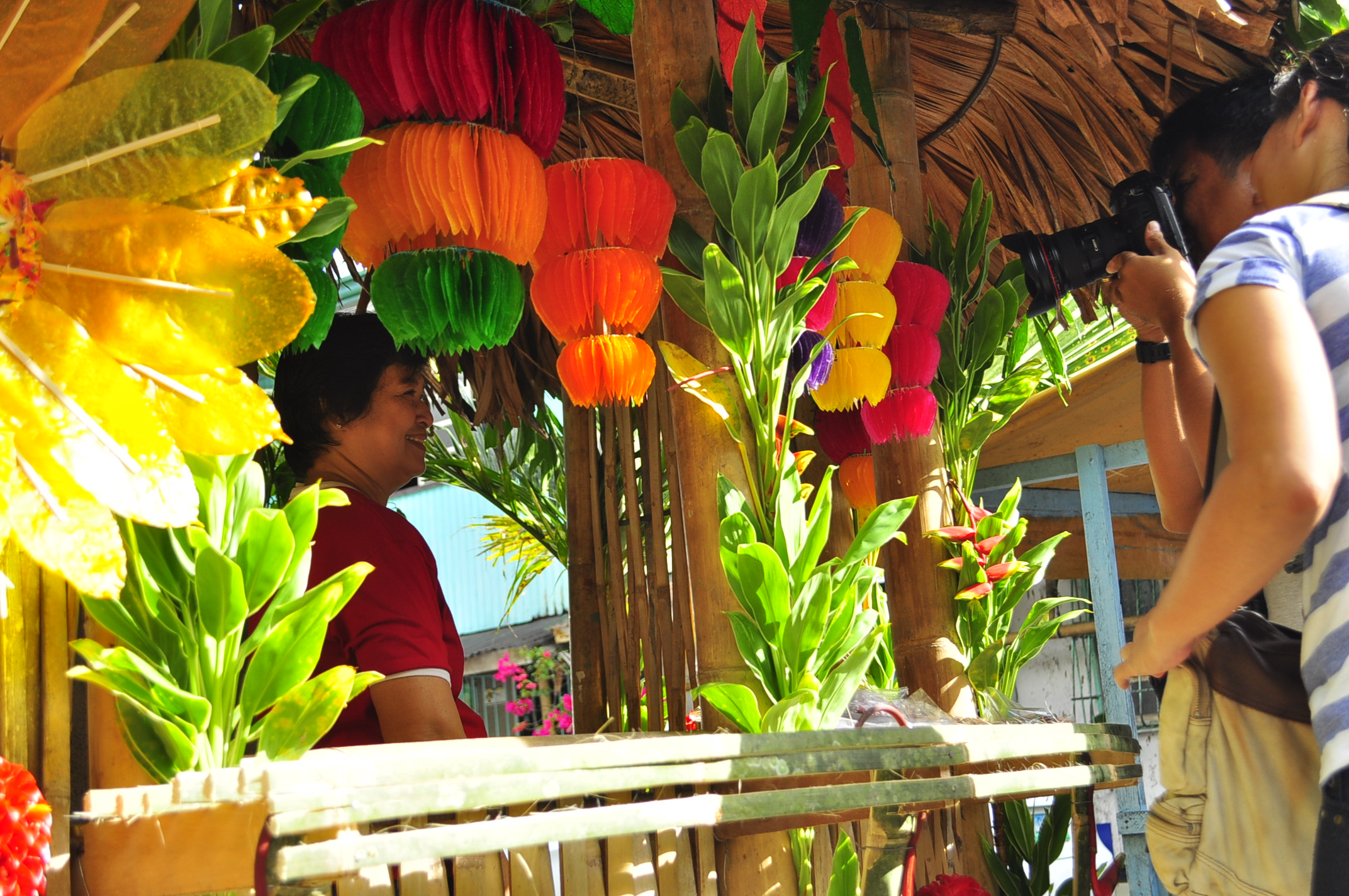
A vendor selling colorful fried kiping

Kiping is characteristically leaf-shaped. It is made with molds made from real leaves of various plants that are non-toxic and do not have unusual tastes. The most commonly used are leaves from the kabal tree, Fagraea racemosa. Other plants used include coffee, talisay (Terminalia catappa), cacao, antipolo (Artocarpus blancoi), and saba banana.

The rice paste is made from glutinous rice (usually older harvests) that have been soaked for a few hours before being ground into a paste. It is mixed with water, a little bit of coarse salt, and various food dyes. The paste is then spread on the chosen leaf molds and steamed for around half an hour. After steaming, the leaves are then air-dried in shade and peeled off. They are piled on top of each other and weighted down for half a day. They are then separated and dried again, then again compressed under a weight for another half day. They are traditionally hung on strings for storage. There is a traditional superstition that in order to prevent the kiping from cracking, silence must be observed during the entire preparation.

Kiping is usually eaten grilled or fried. It can be dipped in sugar or vinegar or other kinds of dips. Kiping can also be used as decorations, especially during the Pahiyas Festival, where bundles of kiping are shaped into colorful chandeliers (called arangya), giant flowers, and other ornaments. These are used to decorate individual houses which are then judged by festival organizers.

== Similar dishes ==
Kiping is also another name for kabkab, a similar cassava-based wafer from other parts of the country.

== See also ==
- Aparon
- Barquillos
- Krupuk
- Kropek
