= Fried pork =

Pork dish

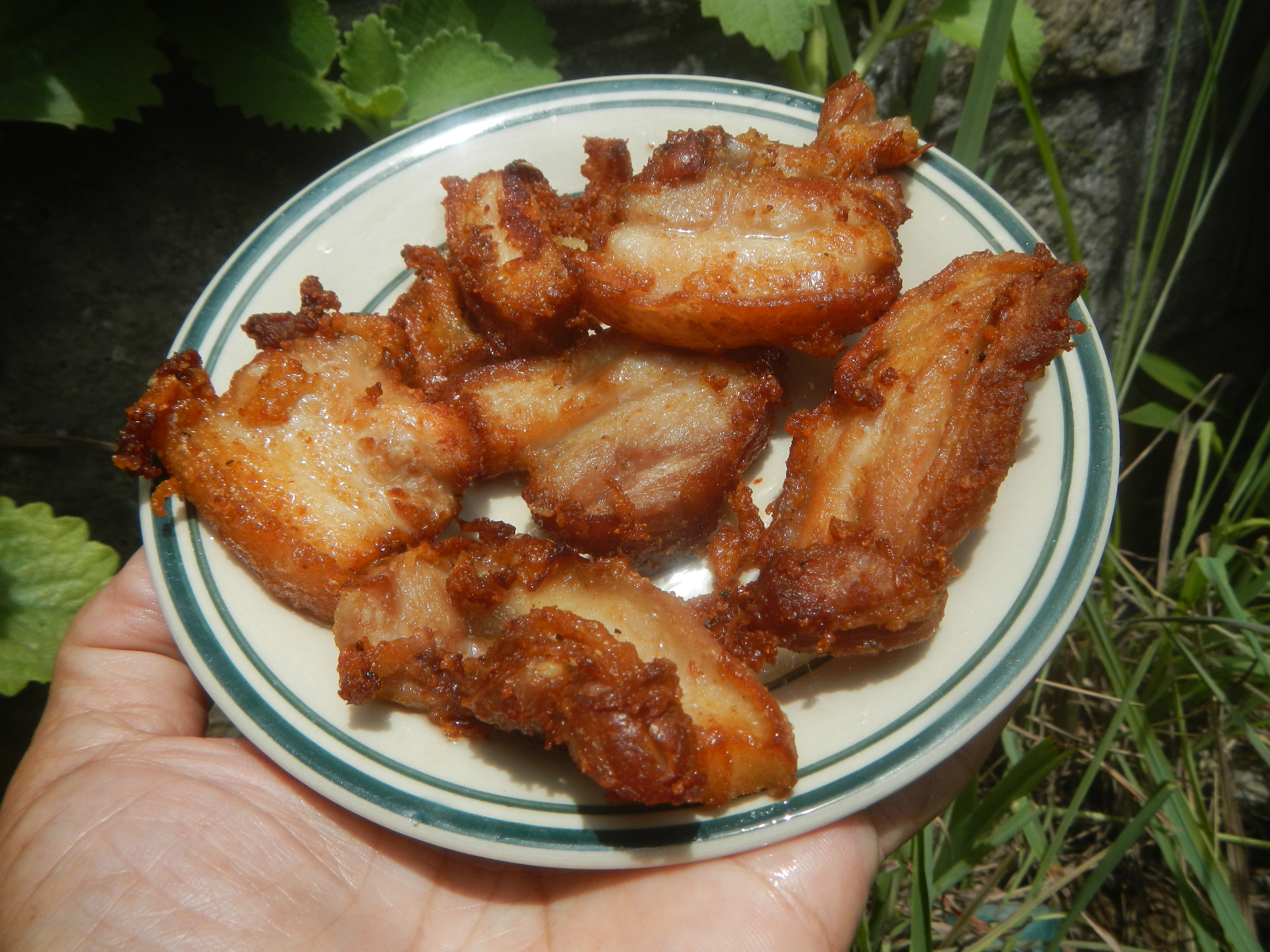
- A plate of fried pork
- Course: Main course
- Region or state: Worldwide
- Serving temperature: Hot or cold
- Main ingredients: Pork, batter or seasoned flour

Fried pork dishes are found in many cuisines around the world, with each region developing its own variations influenced by local cooking methods and culinary traditions. Known for its tenderness and versatility, pork is often prepared by frying for the resultant crispy and savory succulence.

Fried pork is commonly associated with American and Asian cuisines. In America, fried pork chops seasoned with salt and pepper are a classic example. In China and Singapore, crispy pork belly is a beloved dish. It features a slab of seasoned pork belly roasted until the meat is tender and juicy, with a layer of fat beneath a golden-brown, crackling skin.

== List of other fried pork dishes ==
- Stegt flæsk, fried pork belly from Denmark which is generally served with potatoes and a parsley sauce (persillesovs)
- Griot, a Haitian staple dish consisting of pork shoulder which is marinated in citrus, braised, and deep-fried
- Crispy pata
- Lechon
- Tonkatsu, a Japanese food which consists of a breaded, deep-fried pork cutlet
- Kotlet schabowy, a Polish pork cutlet
- Mátrai Borzaska is a traditional Hungarian dish, from the Mátra mountain regions. It is pork loin in a grated potato and grated potatoes with sour cream and cheese gravy.
- Schnitzel, which can be made from pork or other meat.
