= Pork cutlet =

Pork cutlet may refer to:

- Tonkatsu, a Japanese breaded pork cutlet
- Dongaseu, a Korean breaded pork cutlet
- Kotlet schabowy, a Polish breaded pork cutlet

== See also ==
- pork
- cutlet
