= Prawn cracker =

Southeast Asian crackers made of prawn and tapioca flour

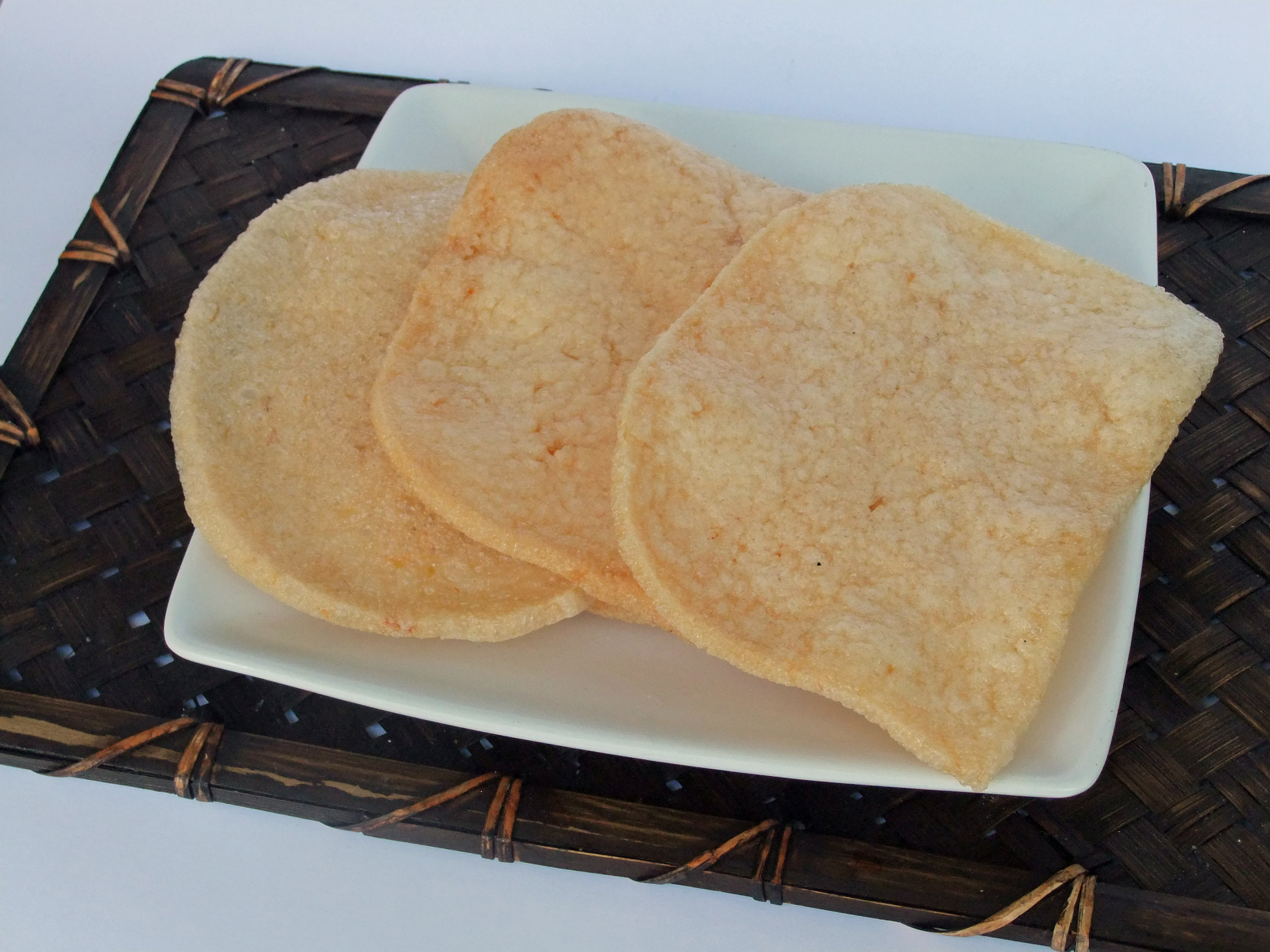
- Krupuk udang
- Course: Snack
- Place of origin: Southeast Asia
- Serving temperature: Room temperature
- Main ingredients: Deep-fried dried starch and other ingredients, most popularly prawn
- Variations: Different variations according to ingredients

Prawn crackers are deep-fried crackers made from starch and prawn that are popular as snacks and side dishes across Southeast Asia. They are prepared from a dough of starch (commonly tapioca), ground seafood and seasonings that is rolled, sliced, dried and later fried, during which the slices rapidly expand to a light and crisp texture.

The snack is widespread under different local names. In Indonesia it is known as krupuk udang, while in Malaysia, Singapore, Brunei and southern Thailand it is called keropok udang. In the Philippines the counterpart is kropek and in Vietnam the variant bánh phồng tôm. Despite regional differences in terminology, flavouring and customary uses, prawn crackers share a broadly similar method of preparation and form part of a shared culinary tradition across maritime and mainland Southeast Asia.

== History ==
Prawn crackers are associated with food practices common in Asia, where seafood, grains and root crops were dietary staples. Early forms were prepared by mixing starch with shrimp, fish or tubers and drying the mixture to extend shelf life. Similar methods are thought to have developed independently in several coastal and island regions of Southeast Asia.

In the Malay Peninsula, oral tradition attributes the creation of keropok udang (prawn crackers) to the 16th century, when prawn heads left from feasts were repurposed into crackers. A related preparation, kropeck, is found in the Philippines, where it is thought to have been introduced through early contact with Malay communities prior to Spanish colonisation. Typically made from shrimp or fish paste combined with flour and dried before frying, it became a common snack and remains widely consumed.

In Vietnam, bánh phồng tôm developed in the Mekong Delta, where rice cultivation and shrimp farming were central to local subsistence and trade. Production in Sa Đéc expanded during the Nguyễn dynasty in the 19th century and the crackers circulated through South China Sea trade routes, showing similarities to varieties elsewhere in Southeast Asia. In southern China, particularly in Fujian and Guangdong, shrimp paste mixed with rice flour was used to produce xiāpiàn. Commercial links maintained by Hokkien and Teochew merchants facilitated the movement of these products into Southeast Asia, where they were adapted to local ingredients and preferences.

Across the wider region, the production of prawn crackers formed part of the broader tradition of prawn crackers. The use of locally available resources such as cassava, sago, shrimp and fish gave rise to numerous regional variations. Distinct forms developed in areas including Sumatra, the Malay Peninsula, Java, Borneo, Sulawesi, Luzon and the Visayas. Long-standing trade and cultural networks enabled the circulation of ingredients and methods, linking these local traditions into a wider Southeast Asian pattern of cracker-making.

== Variations ==
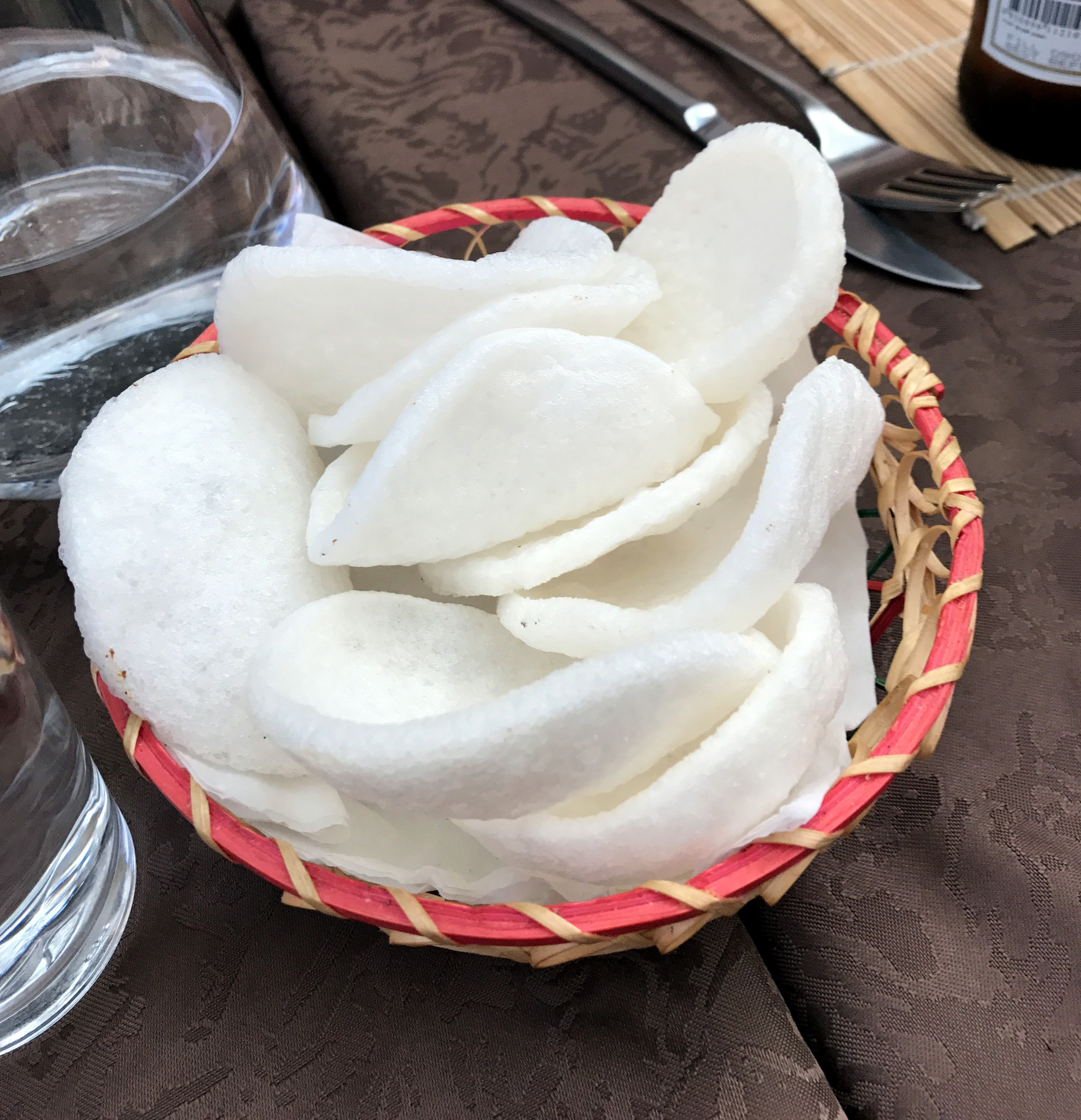
A basket of Vietnamese prawn crackers in Lyon, France

=== Southeast Asia ===
Prawn crackers are prepared and consumed across much of maritime and mainland Southeast Asia under closely related names. In Indonesia they are most commonly known as krupuk udang, with major production centred in Sidoarjo (East Java) and Cirebon (West Java), where commercial brands such as Finna and Komodo are widely distributed. In neighbouring Malaysia, Singapore, Brunei and southern Thailand, the same product is called keropok udang and is strongly associated with festive occasions including Hari Raya and Chinese New Year.

Elsewhere in the region, the Philippine kropek (or kropeck) is generally eaten as a snack, often accompanied by vinegar-based dipping sauces and incorporated into Filipino Chinese cuisine. In Vietnam, the variant known as bánh phồng tôm is particularly linked with the Mekong Delta, where Sa Giang of Sa Đéc is a leading brand. Despite differences in naming and customary contexts of consumption, these products share similar methods of preparation and reflect a broader regional culinary tradition.

=== Chinese cuisine ===
In Chinese cuisine, prawn crackers are often prepared with added food colouring, producing shades such as white, pale pink, green, or blue. They are typically light in texture and non-spicy. While they are widely available in supermarkets across China, they are not commonly featured in restaurants or in meals served to guests.

=== Japan ===
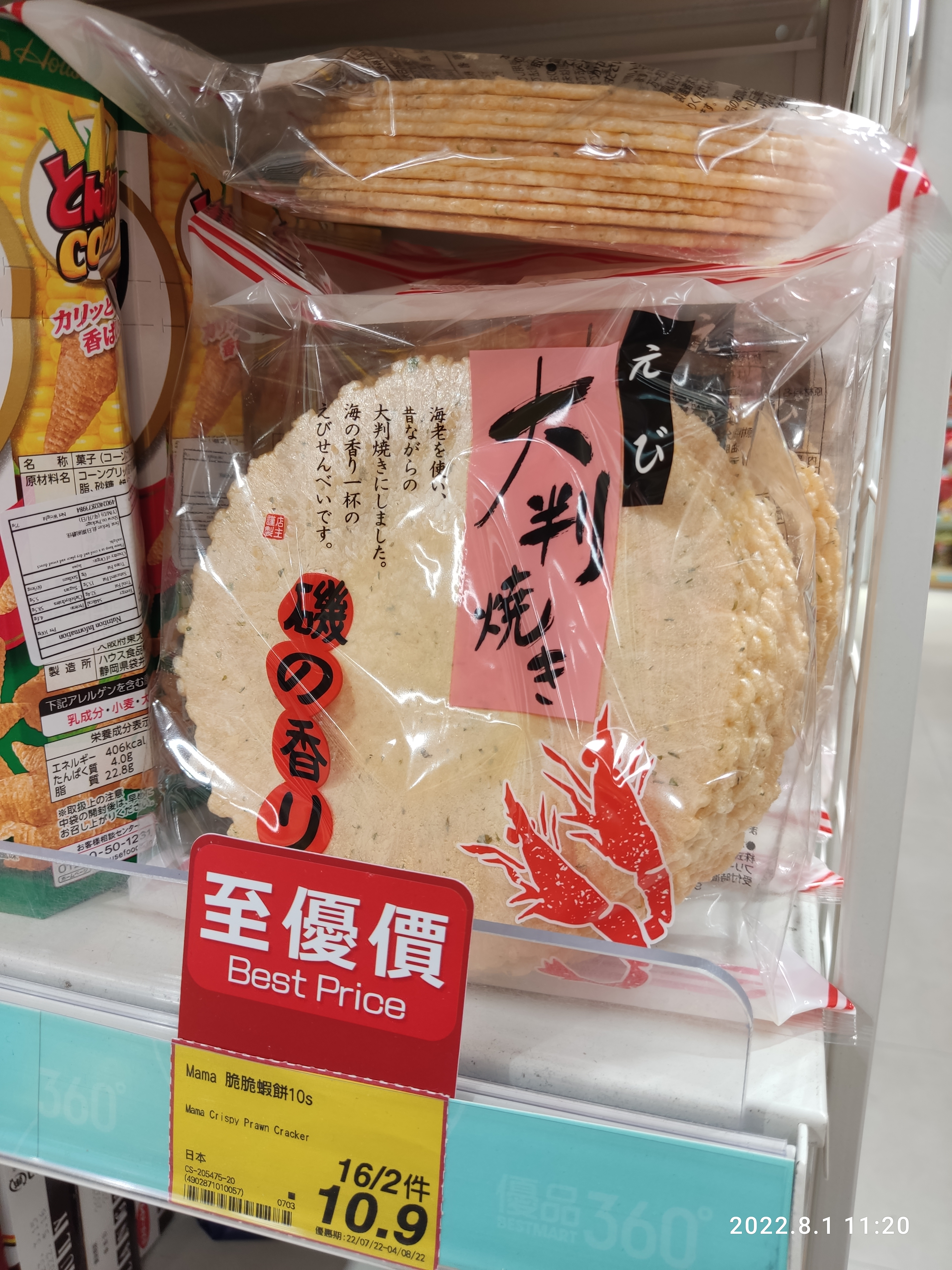
Imported Japanese ebi senbei (shrimp crackers) displayed for sale in Hong Kong

In Japan, a related snack known as ebi senbei (海老煎餅) is popular. Unlike Southeast Asian prawn crackers which are typically made with tapioca starch and massively expand when deep-fried, Japanese ebi senbei are traditionally made from shrimp mixed with potato starch or rice, and are either baked or lightly fried. They originated in Aichi Prefecture and have a denser, flatter texture compared to Chinese or Southeast Asian prawn crackers.

=== Europe and Australia ===
In Europe and Australia, prawn crackers are mainly regarded as snack foods but are frequently served as accompaniments to takeaway Chinese meals. In countries such as Australia, Germany, Belgium, the Netherlands, Spain, the United Kingdom and Ireland, they are often included with dishes such as white-cut chicken or crispy fried chicken in Chinese restaurants.

In the Netherlands, the product is known as kroepoek, a term encompassing various types of deep-fried crackers made from starch and flavourings such as prawn or crab. The Dutch familiarity with kroepoek stems from historical links with Indonesia, and it remains widely available in supermarkets, toko (Indo-Dutch shops) and Indische restaurants. It is also commonly served in Chinese restaurants in both the Netherlands and Belgium.

== See also ==
- Papadam
- Fish cracker
- Kabkab
- Kiping
- Krupuk kulit, a food of similar texture and appearance made of beef skin
- List of deep fried foods
- Skips (snack): A British tapioca snack similar to prawn crackers but smaller in size
- Ebi senbei (Japanese Wikipedia article on the Japanese shrimp cracker)
