= Seblak =

Savoury and spicy dish special to Bandung, Indonesia

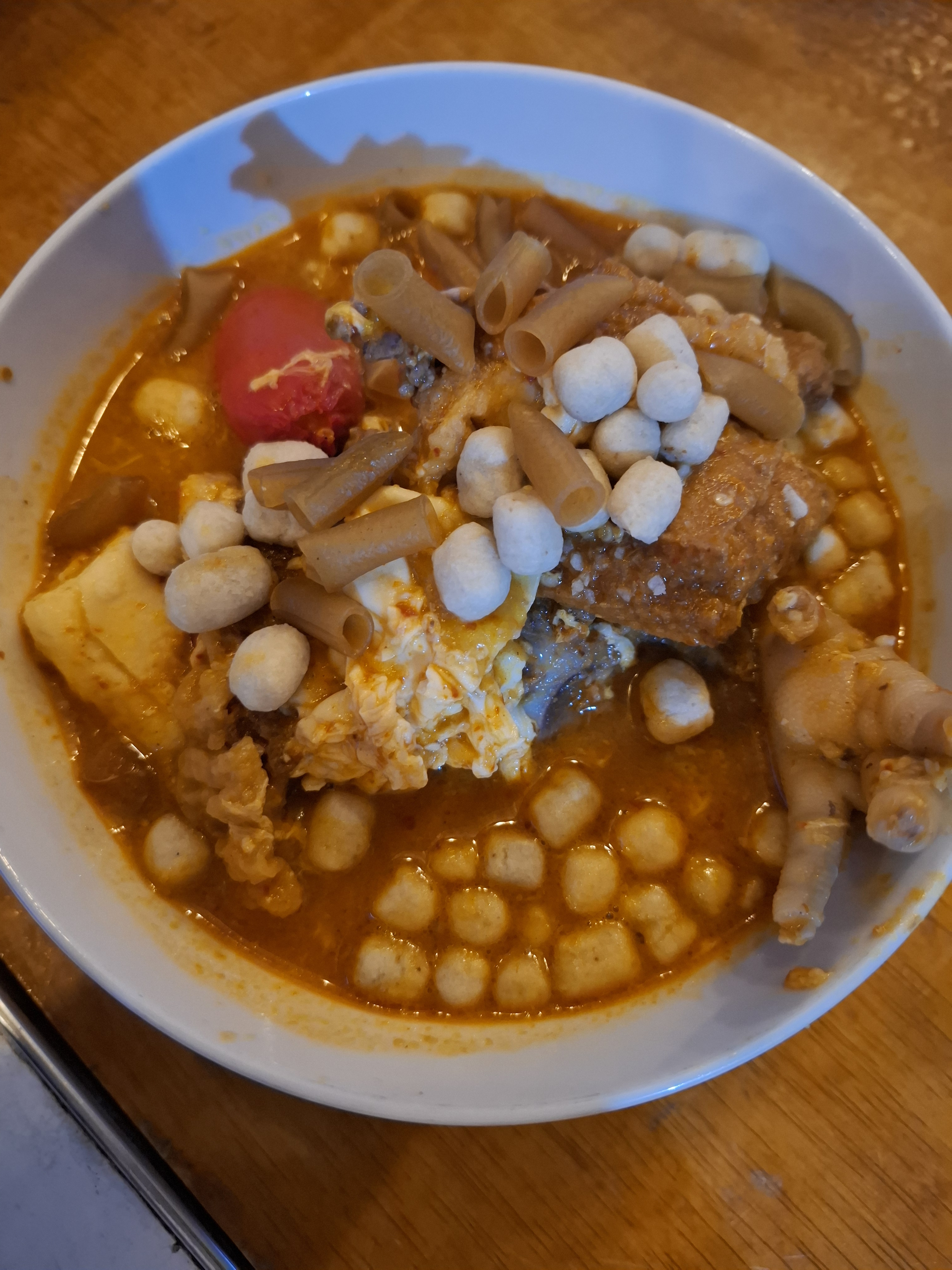
- A bowl of seafood seblak
- Course: Main or snack
- Region or state: Bandung, West Java, Indonesia
- Associated cuisine: Indonesian (Sundanese cuisine)
- Created by: Sundanese people
- Serving temperature: Hot
- Main ingredients: Wet kurupuk cooked with scrambled egg, vegetables, and other protein sources (chicken meat and feet, seafood, or beef sausages), with spicy sauces including garlic, shallot, kencur, sweet soy sauce, and chili sauce.
- Variations: Seblak kering (dry seblak) or kurupuk seblak which is actually a spicy kurupuk (traditional cracker)

Seblak (Sundanese: ᮞᮨᮘᮣᮊ᮪, Sundanese pronunciation: [səblak]) is a Sundanese savoury and spicy dish that is a specialty of Bandung city, West Java, Indonesia made of kurupuk (traditional crackers) drenched wet or soggy in a spicy broth cooked with protein sources (egg, chicken, seafood or beef). Seblak can be found in restaurants, warungs or sold on the streets from carts. It is one of the most popular street foods not only in Bandung, but also Jakarta.

== Origins ==
The word seblak may have come from Sundanese nyeblak "surprising" after its striking heat and richness in spices made from galangal (cikur or kencur) and chili pepper. Seblak may have originated in a type of spicy kurupuk flavoured with those spices from rural southern Cianjur area before the Independence era which retroactively has been called seblak kering (dry seblak) or kurupuk seblak; whereas the seblak drenched in broth is accurately called seblak basah (wet seblak).

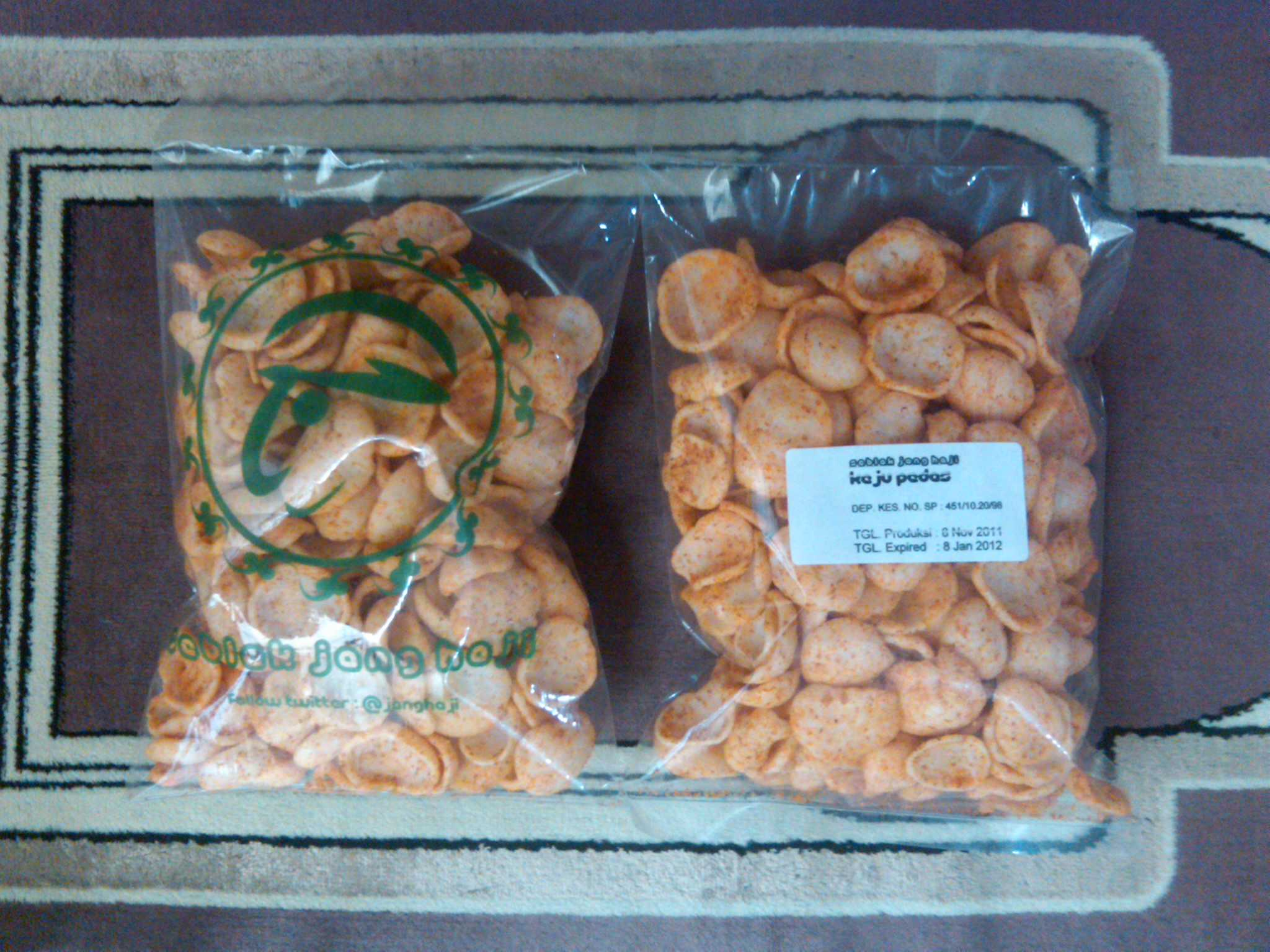
"Dry seblak" or kurupuk seblak

Seblak first appeared in Bandung circa 2000s: It is suggested that the dish was originally started as a frugal way to avoid wasting uneaten old kurupuk; a way to safely (and pleasantly) consume stale old kurupuk by cooking it with other ingredients, to make it more satisfying. Nevertheless, the pleasantly soft and chewy texture along with its broth's savoury rich and spicy taste has made seblak an Indonesian, especially Sundanese street food favourite.

== Ingredients ==
Seblak has two main components: the kurupuk, and the spicy sambal broth that softens the kurupuk to a chewy gelatin-like texture. Almost all kinds of kurupuk can be made into seblak such as fish crackers, but the most savoury (and usually more costly) version uses kurupuk udang (prawn crackers).

The sambal broth is made by sauteeing ground aromatics like garlic, shallot, galangal and chili paste (amount to fit preferred degree of spiciness) in the pot before an egg is added aside to stir fry or scramble until cooked; only then water is added to be stirred evenly before kurupuk is added. Wet kurupuk would shrivel into smaller sizes compared to fried ones, thus a lot of kurupuk pieces are required to fill a bowl of seblak. Vendors often add other carbohydrate sources like kwetiau sticks and/or pasta like fusilli and macaroni as filler for a more satisfying mouthfeel as well as keeping prices affordable.

Vegetables and other protein sources (including chicken; seafood; slices of beef sausages or bakso) can be added by this time; one popular variant has chicken feet. Other condiments like kecap manis (sweet soy sauce) maybe added to enhance the broth's flavour.

Seblak preparation

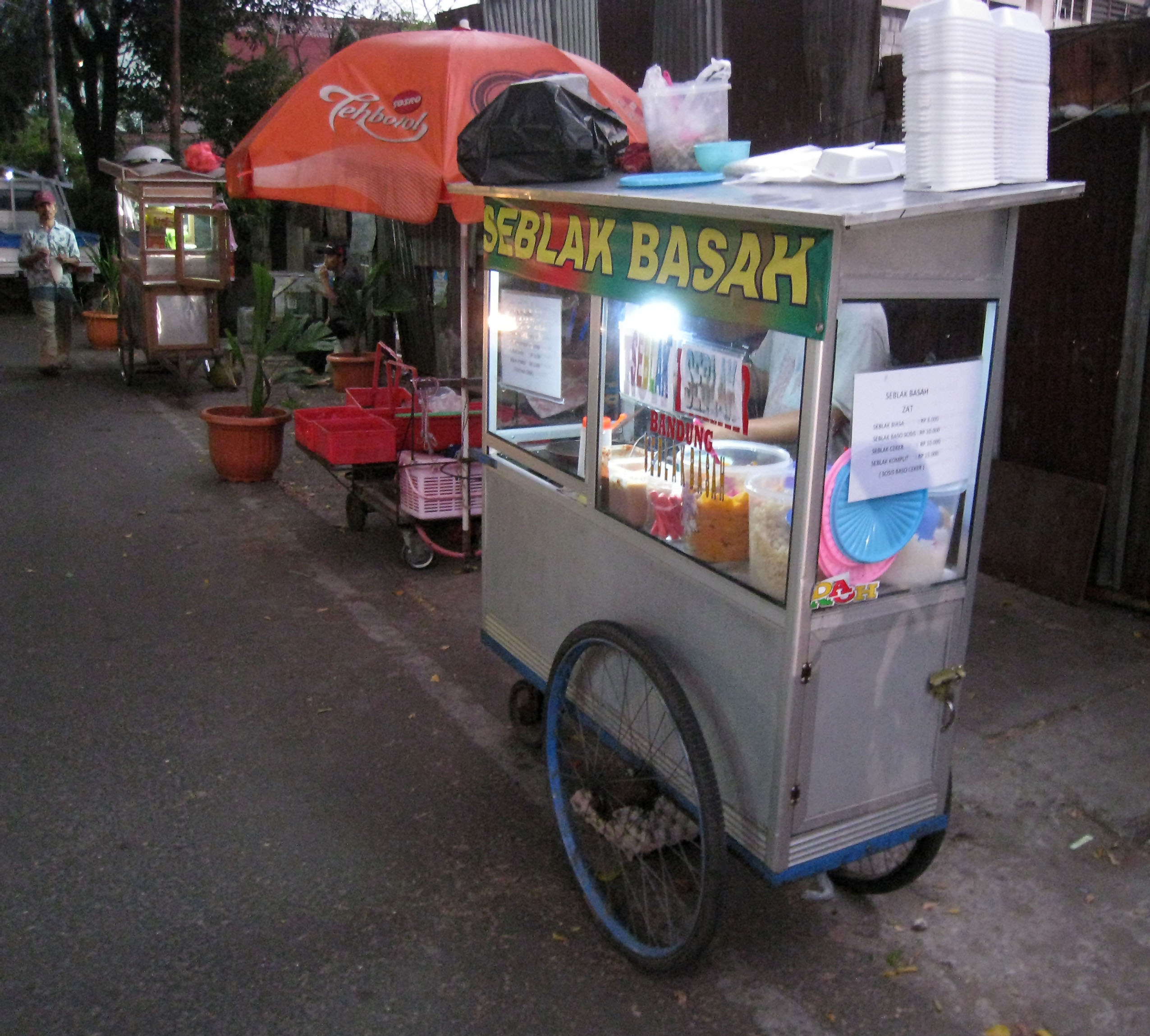
Seblak cart street vendor

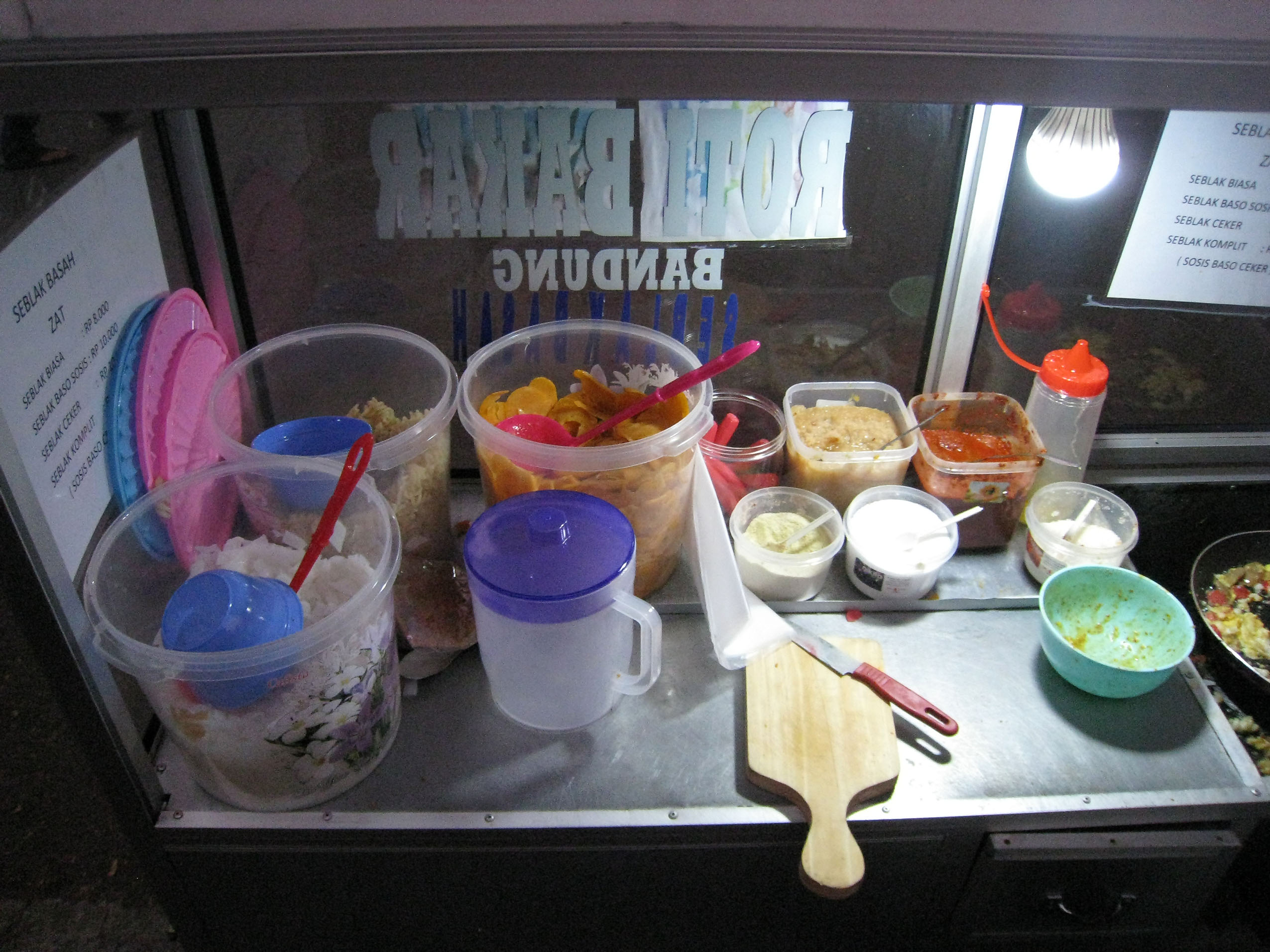
Seblak ingredients

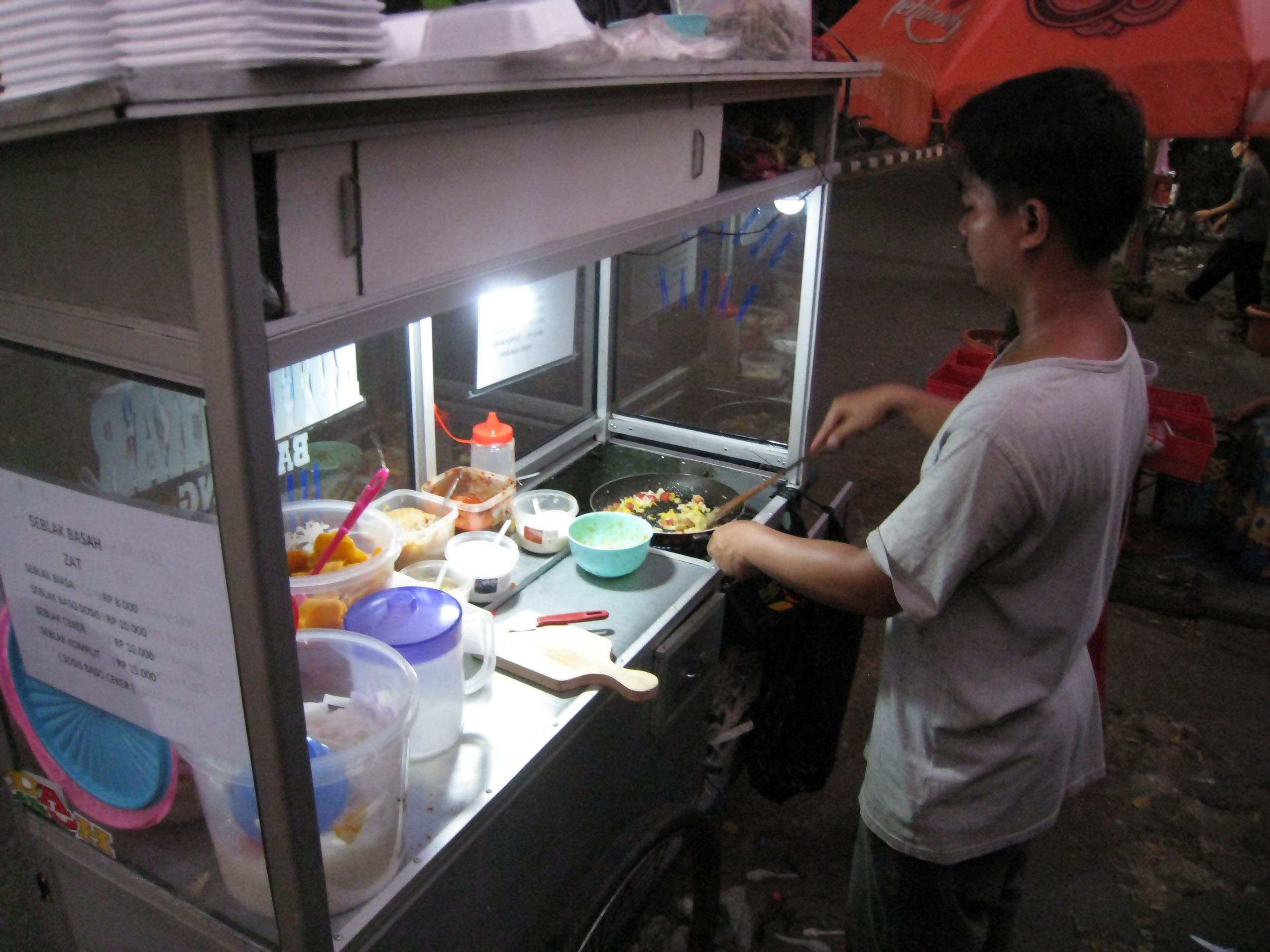
Street vendor cooking seblak

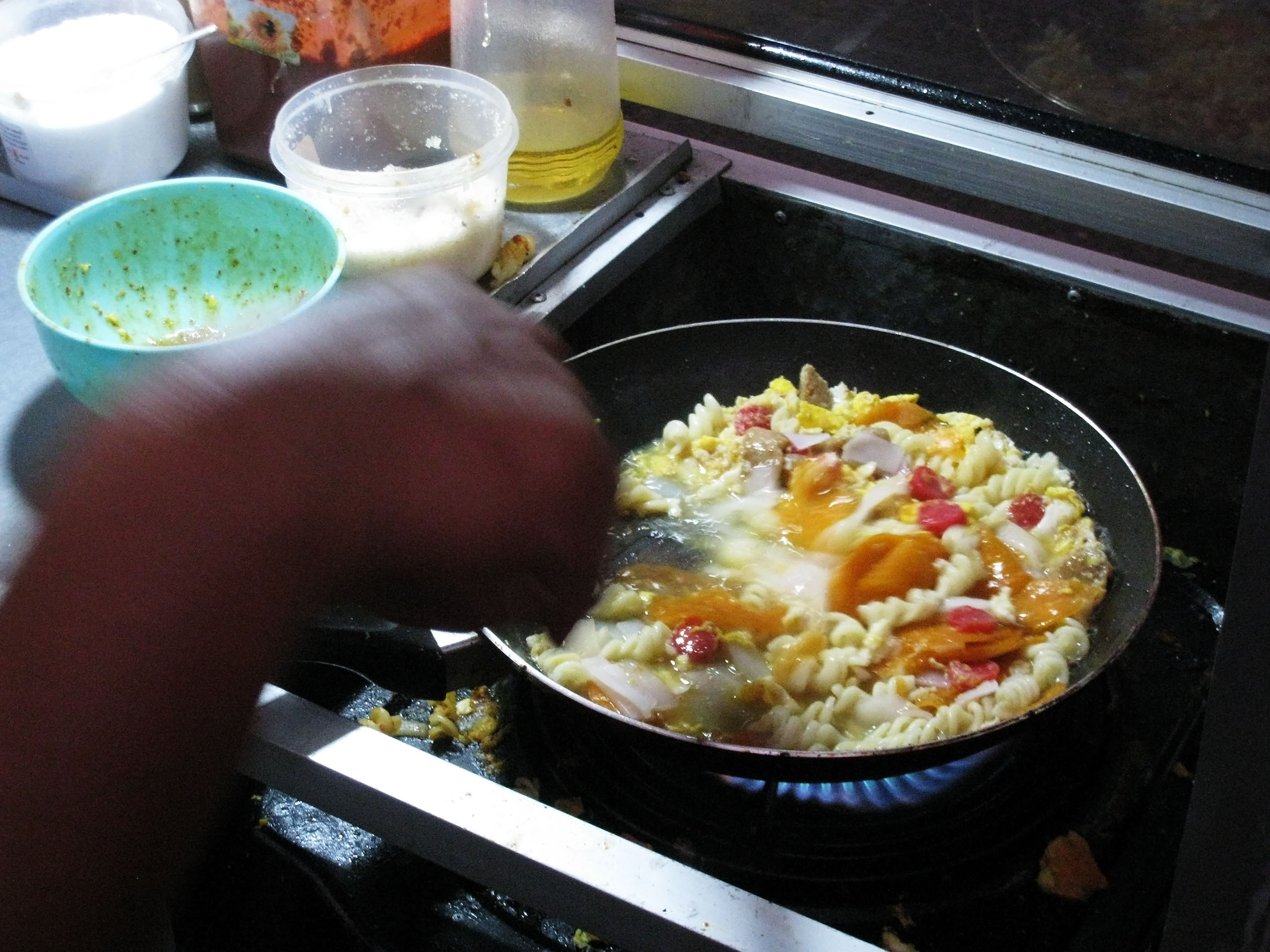
Cooking seblak

== International popularity ==
In 2025, Seblak saw sudden viral popularity across Thailand after it was featured by TikTok user @TheChanisara who said she had came across seblak travelling in Bandung which though she found its appearance unusual but showed great enthusiasm while eating it several times; Thai actors like Mew Suppasit and Davika Hoorne also have on the record tried the dish while visiting Jakarta in 2023 and 2024 respectively.

== See also ==
- Kurupuk
- Siomay
- Batagor
- Mie goreng
