= Rengginang =

Indonesian rice cracker

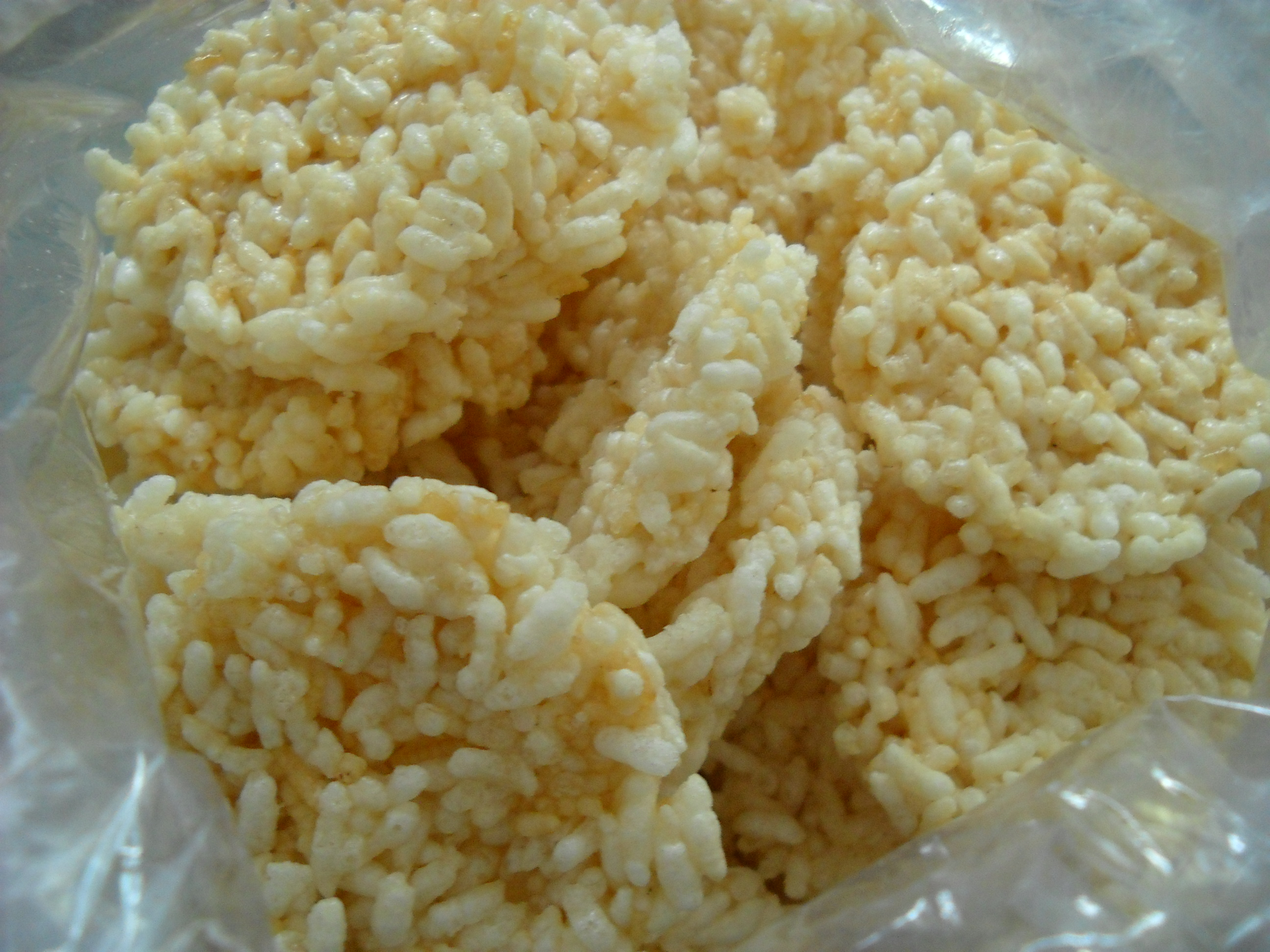
- Rengginang
- Alternative names: Ranginang, intip (Javanese)
- Type: Rice cracker
- Course: Snack
- Place of origin: Indonesia
- Region or state: West Java, Banten
- Created by: Sundanese cuisine
- Serving temperature: Room temperature
- Main ingredients: Rice

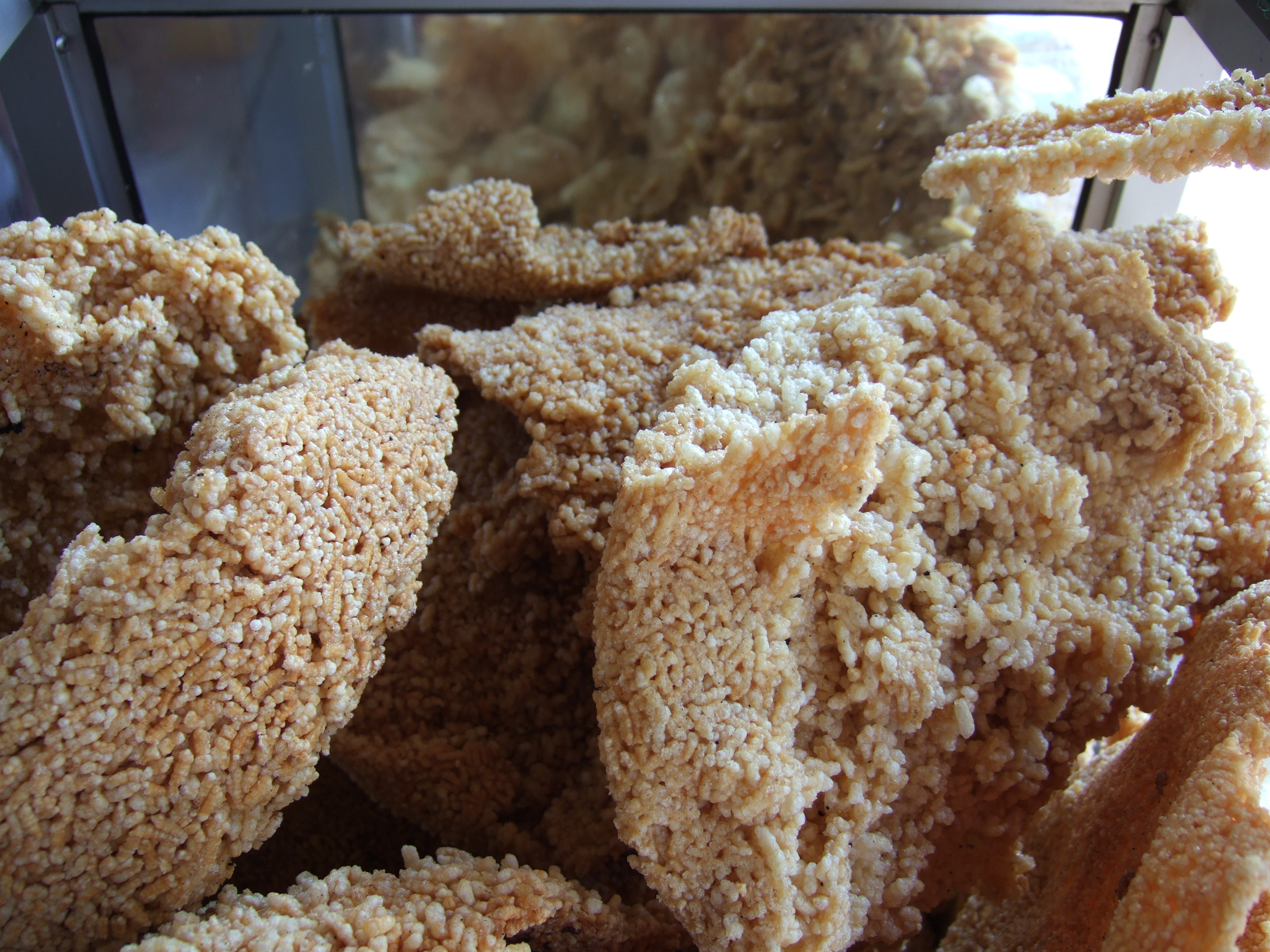
Larger sized intip sold in Cirebon

Rengginang, ranginang or intip is a variety of Indonesian thick rice crackers, made from cooked glutinous sticky rice and seasoned with spices, made into a flat and rounded shape, and then sun-dried. The sun-dried rengginang is deep-fried with ample cooking oil to produce a crispy rice cracker.

This cracker is quite different from other types of traditional Asian crackers such as the Indonesian krupuk and the Japanese senbei or beika; while most traditional crackers' ingredients are ground into a fine paste, rengginang retains the shapes of its rice grains. It is similar to the Japanese arare, and yet it differs because arare are individually separated larger rice pellets. In contrast, rengginang rice granules are stuck together in a flat-rounded shape. Rengginang is traditionally made from dried leftover rice. In Suriname, it is known as brong-brong.

Rengginang can be plain or flavoured sweet, salty or savoury. The most common rengginang are deep-fried with added pinches of salt for a traditional salty taste. Sweet rengginang uses thick liquified coconut sugar-coated or poured upon it. Other variants have other ingredients added to enrich the taste, such as dried prawn, terasi (shrimp paste), or lorjuk (razor clam).

== Similar crackers ==
In Central Java, especially in the Wonogiri Regency, there is an almost identical rice cracker called intip made from scorched rice, the hardened semi-burnt rice sticks to the inner bottom of rice-cooking vessels. These cooking vessels are filled with water to loosen up the stuck rice. After it is separated from the cooking vessel, the stuck rice is sun-dried until it loses all of its liquid contents. The dried sticky rice is later deep-fried in a lot of cooking oil to create a crispy rice cracker. There is no significant difference between rengginang and intip other than its size; because intip is created from the inner bottom of the cooking vessel, it is larger than a rengginang.

== See also ==
- Arare
- Krupuk
- Sachima
- Senbei
- Rempeyek
- Rice crackers
- Rice Krispies Treats
