= Beika =

Dry confectionery made out of rice

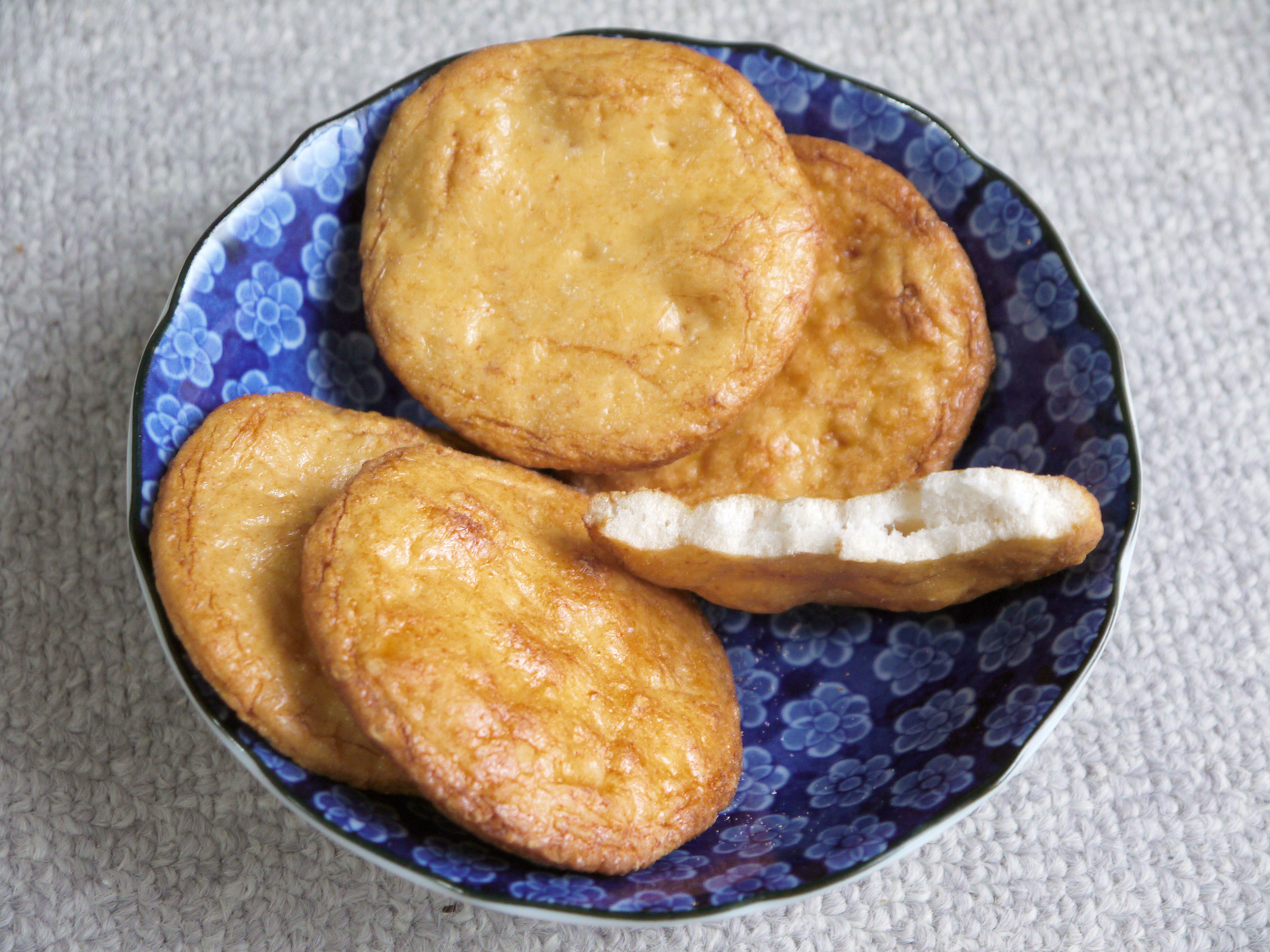
- Senbei rice crackers
- Type: Higashi
- Place of origin: Japan
- Main ingredients: Rice (or wheat flour or barley flour)
- Variations: Senbei, arare, kaki no tane, okaki

In Japanese, beika (米菓) describes a higashi (dry Japanese confectionery) that is made out of rice. Beika is a word used for any dry snack made of rice. Unlike senbei, which is more specifically rice crackers and may also include other flours, beika can be more than just crackers. Major types include:

- senbei
- okaki
- arare
- kaki no tane

Some types of senbei may use wheat flour or barley flour instead of rice flour, for example tansan senbei, nanbu senbei and kawara senbei.

== See also ==
- Japanese cuisine
- List of crackers
- List of Japanese desserts and sweets
