= Bakauke =

Japanese rice cracker

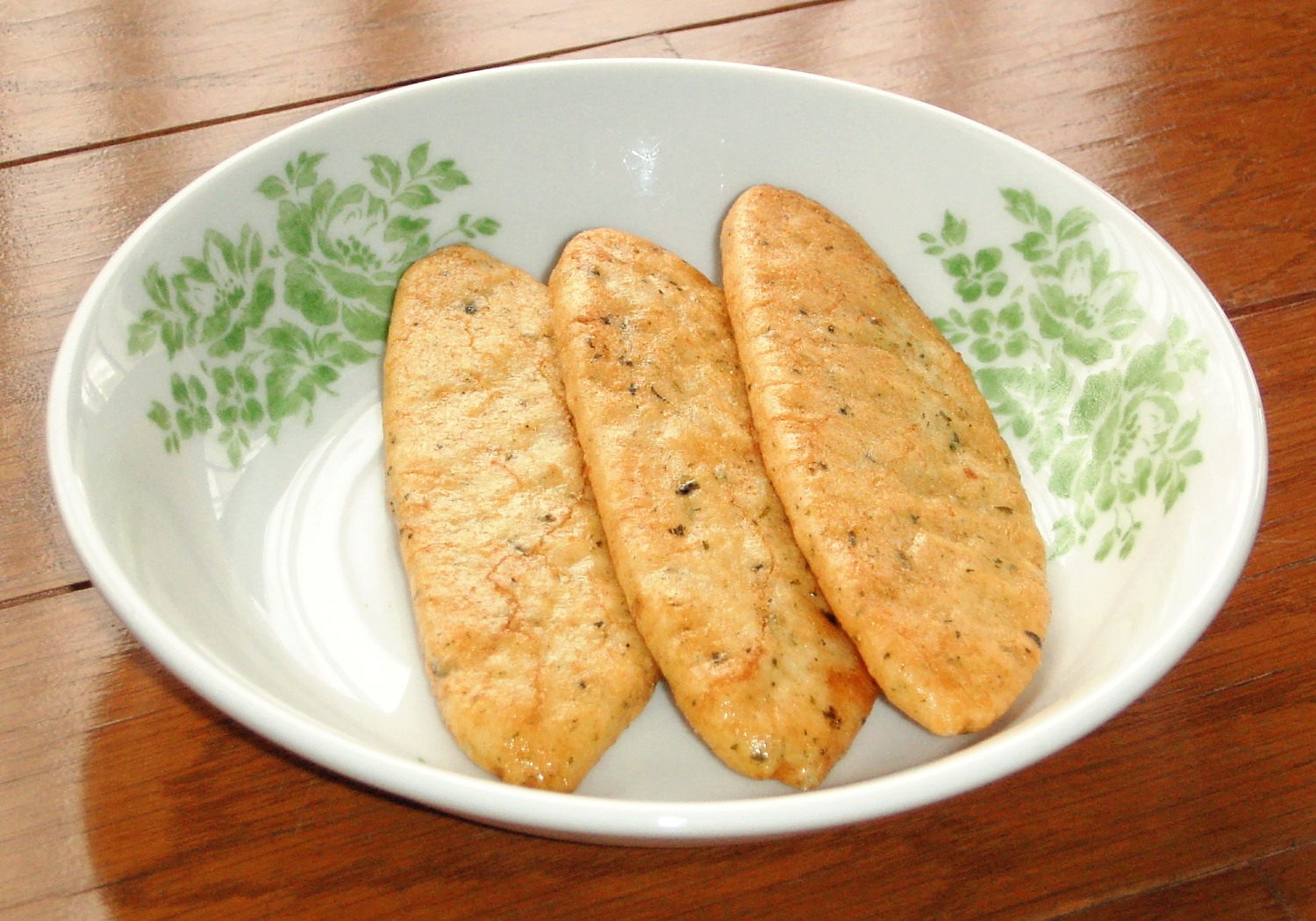
- Type: Rice cracker
- Place of origin: Japan
- Region or state: Niigata Prefecture
- Created by: Kuriyama Beika
- Main ingredients: Rice flour

Bakauke (ばかうけ) is a Japanese snack food. It is a thin banana-shaped senbei with various flavours added. It is manufactured by Kuriyama Beika (栗山米菓) of Niigata Prefecture.

The word bakauke in the Niigata dialect of Japanese colloquially means "extremely well received". The characters who appear on the packets are Borin and Barin, who are boyfriend and girlfriend.
