= Arare (food) =

Japanese cracker

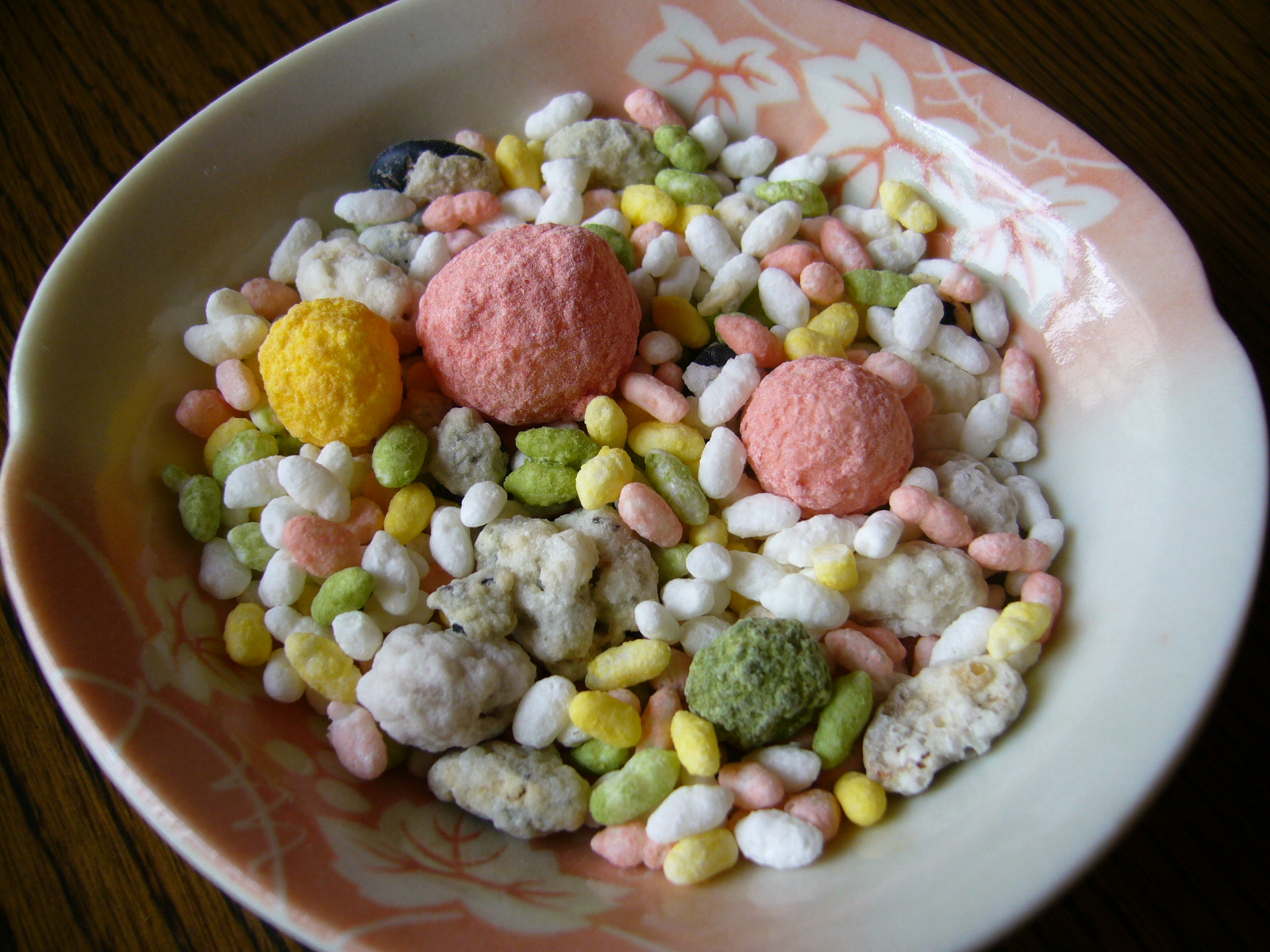
- Hina-arare, a variety of arare
- Type: Rice cracker
- Place of origin: Japan
- Main ingredients: Glutinous rice, soy sauce
- Variations: Olive no Hana

Arare (あられ; which is named after graupel "snow pellets") is a type of bite-sized Japanese cracker made from glutinous rice and flavored with soy sauce. The size and shapes are what distinguish arare from senbei. The name is chosen to evoke hailstones – smaller arare are similar in size and shape to hailstones, though others can vary significantly in size, flavor and shape.

== Types ==
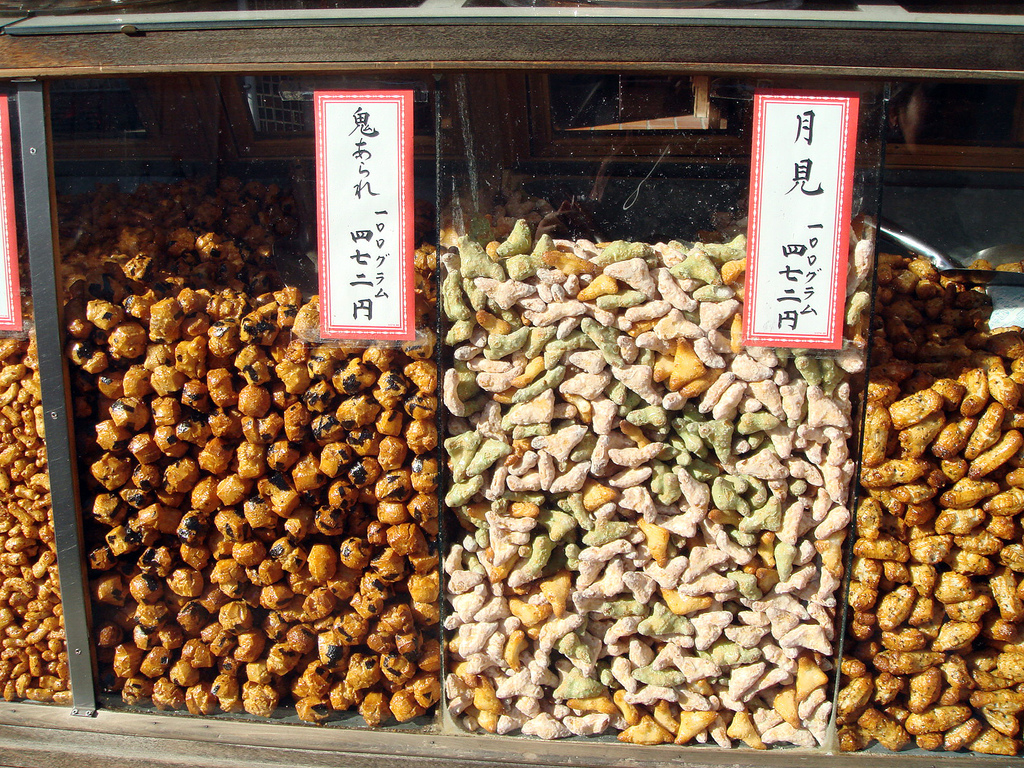
Various types of arare

There are many different sizes, colors, and shapes of arare. Some are sweet, and others savory. One, called norimaki arare (nori meaning an edible seaweed in the form of a dried sheet; maki meaning roll shape) is wrapped with dried nori seaweed. Another, kaki no tane (柿の種), takes its name from its resemblance to a persimmon seed. (Kaki is Japanese for "persimmon".) Kaki no tane are often sold with peanuts, a combination called kakipī (かきピー). These are a popular snack to accompany Japanese beer.

== Culture ==
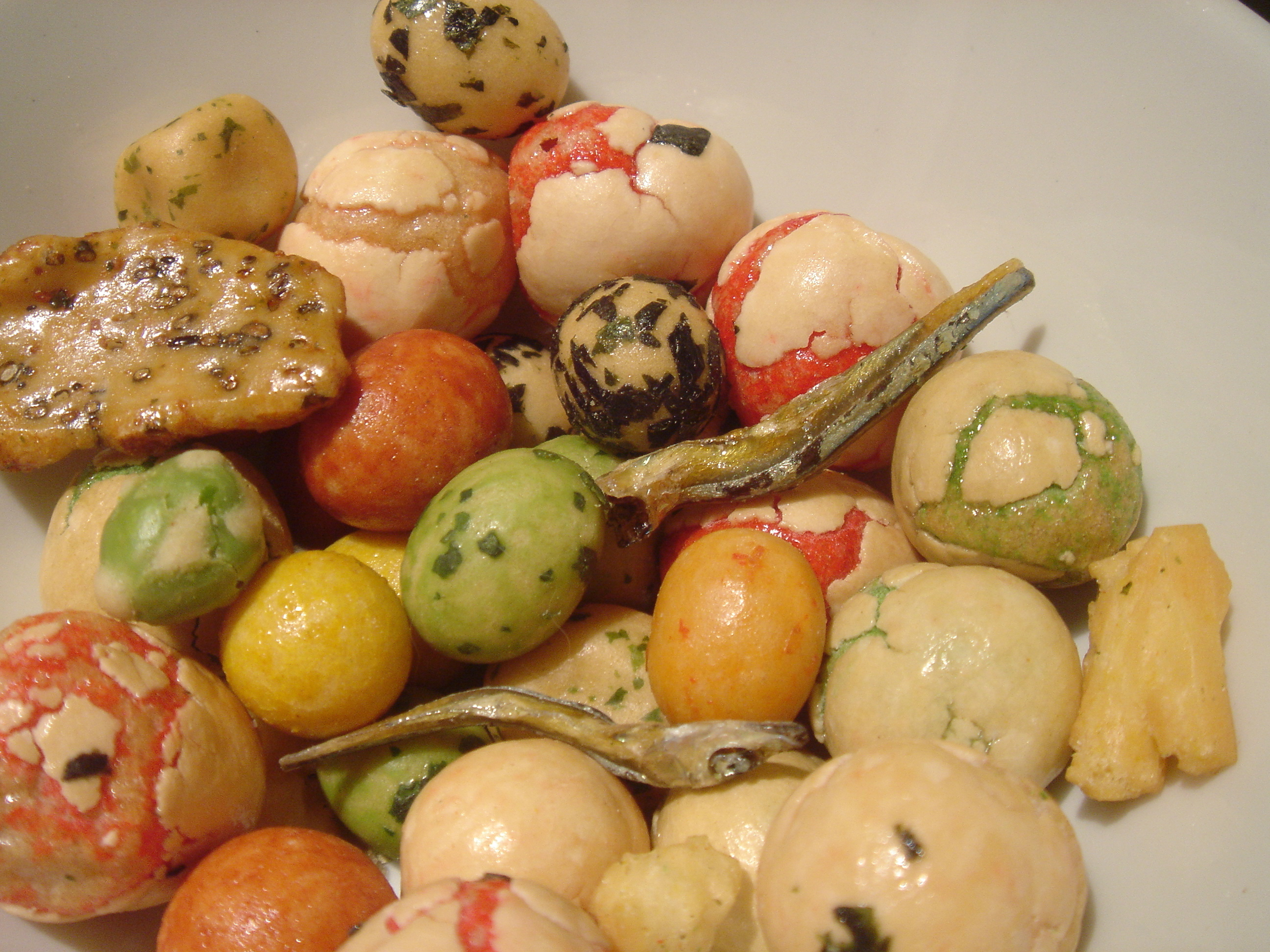
Arare covered peanuts

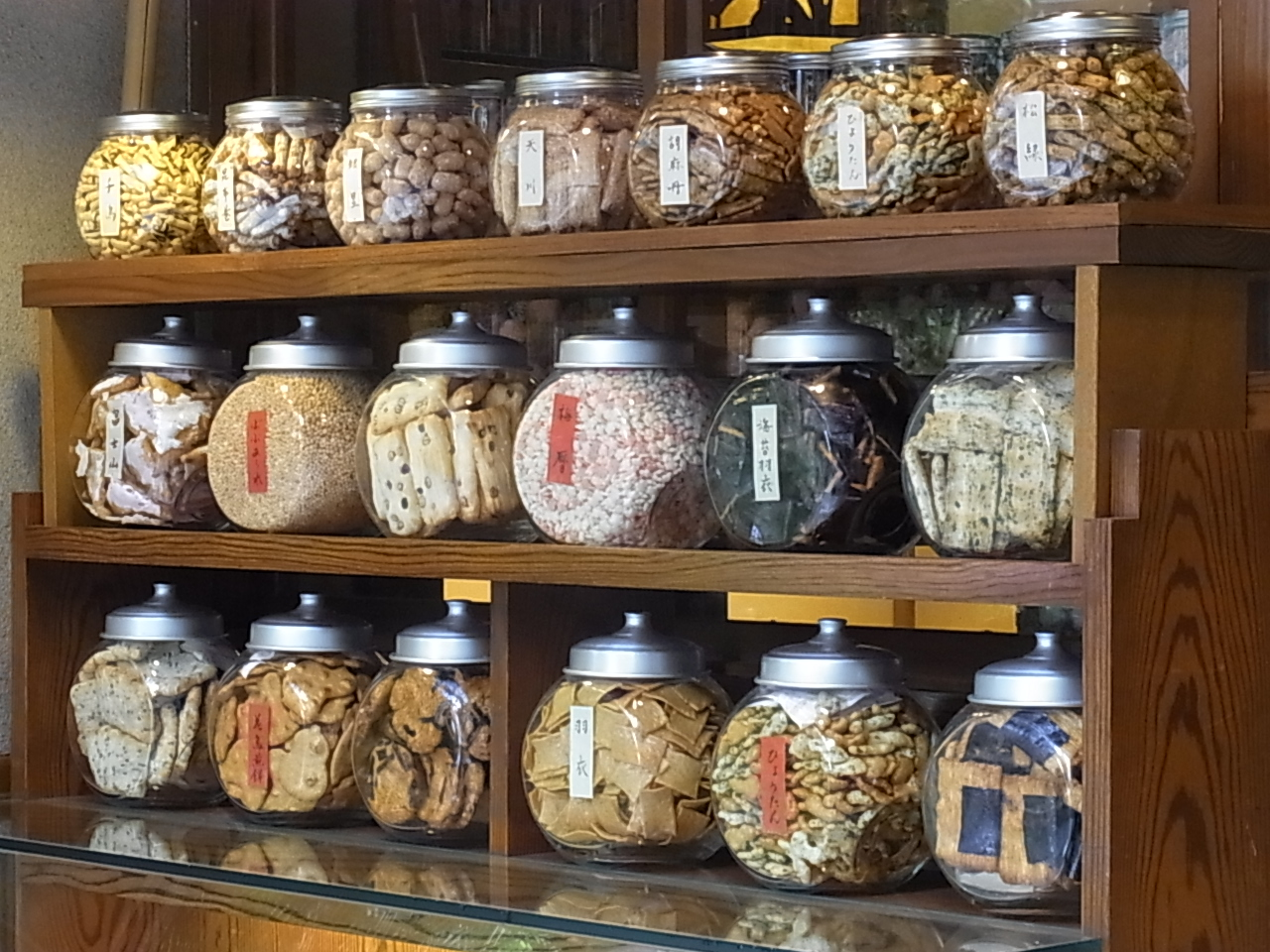
Store selling arare, okaki, senbei and other rice crackers

Japanese typically consume arare to celebrate Hinamatsuri, the "doll festival" held on 3 March. The arare made during the festival are multicolored, in shades including pink, yellow, white, brown and light green. Regular arare can be bought throughout the year, but the colorful ones are only available around January to March in anticipation of Hinamatsuri.

Arare was brought to the US by Japanese immigrants to Hawaii who came as plantation workers in the early 1900s. In Hawaii, the snack is often called mochi crunch or kakimochi (fried rice paste). In Hawaii, it is popular to mix arare with popcorn. Some people mix in furikake, too. The popular "Hurricane popcorn" includes both arare and furikake with the popcorn.

== See also ==
- Agemochi
- Mochi
- Olive no Hana, a blend of arare
- Senbei
- Rengginang, Indonesian rice cracker
