= Rempeyek =

Indonesian savoury cracker

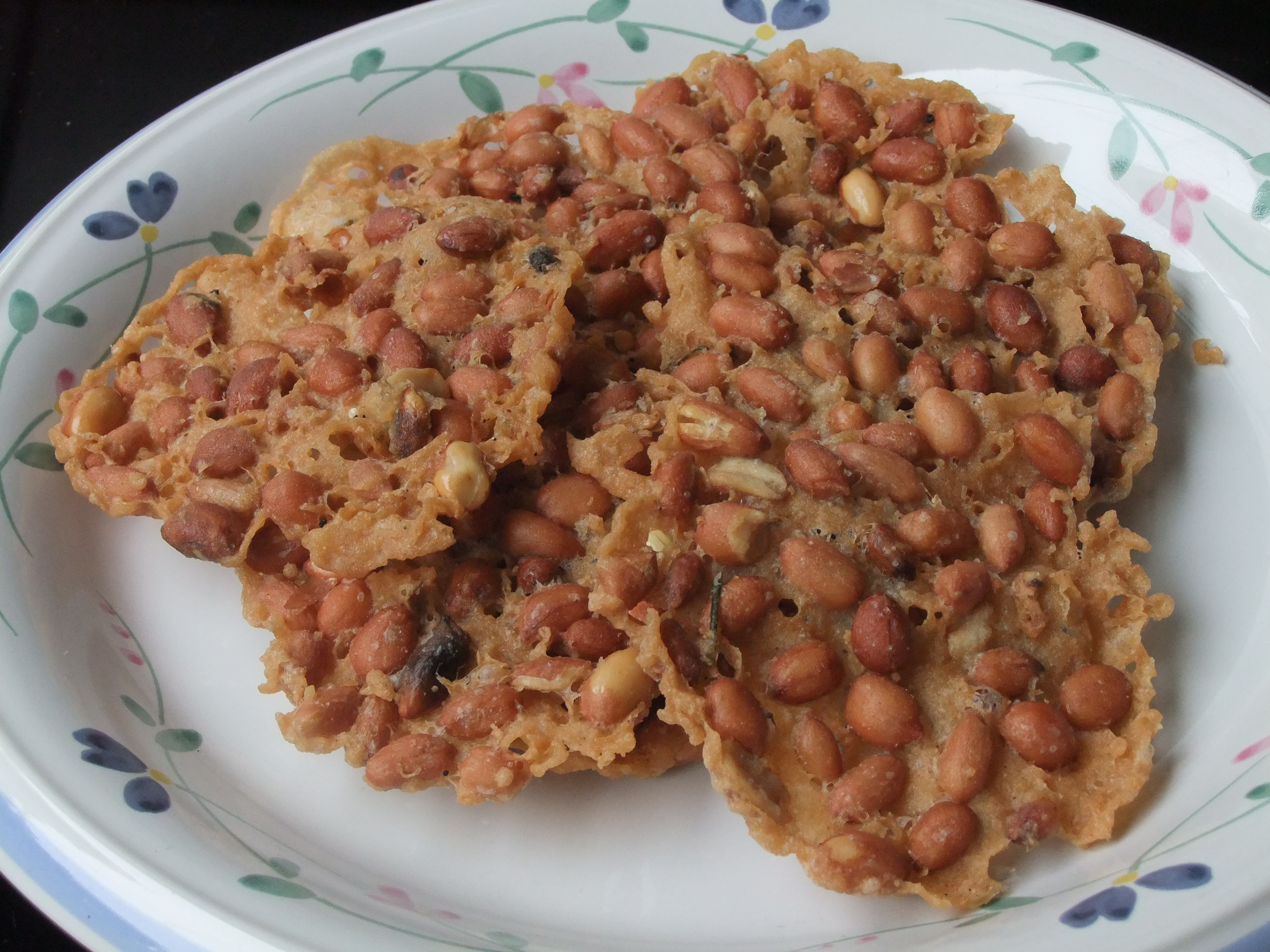
- Peanut rempeyek
- Alternative names: Peyek
- Type: Cracker
- Place of origin: Indonesia
- Region or state: Java and Nationwide in Indonesia
- Main ingredients: Rice flour, peanuts, dried anchovies or shrimp, coconut milk
- Variations: Peyek bayam

Rempeyek or peyek is a deep-fried savoury Indonesian-Javanese cracker made from flour (usually rice flour) with other ingredients, bound or coated by crispy flour batter. The most common type of rempeyek is peyek kacang ("peanut peyek"); However, other ingredients can be used instead, such as teri (dried anchovies), rebon (small shrimp), or ebi (dried shrimp). Today, rempeyek is commonly found in Indonesia and Malaysia, as well as in countries with considerable Indonesian migrant populations, such as The Netherlands and Suriname.

Coconut milk, salt, and spices such as ground candlenuts and coriander are often mixed within the flour batter. Some recipes also add a chopped citrus leaf. The spiced batter, mixed or sprinkled with the granule ingredients, is deep-fried in hot coconut oil. The flour batter acts as a binding agent for the granules (peanuts, anchovy, shrimp, etc.). It hardens upon frying and turns into a golden brown and crispy cracker.

In Indonesia, rempeyek making is traditionally a small-scale home industry, yet today, some rempeyek producers have reached a larger production scale and distribute widely, with a rempeyek-brand trading value reaching 25 million Rupiah (around US$2,100) monthly. In Malaysia, rempeyek is now widely made using machines.

== Etymology and origin ==
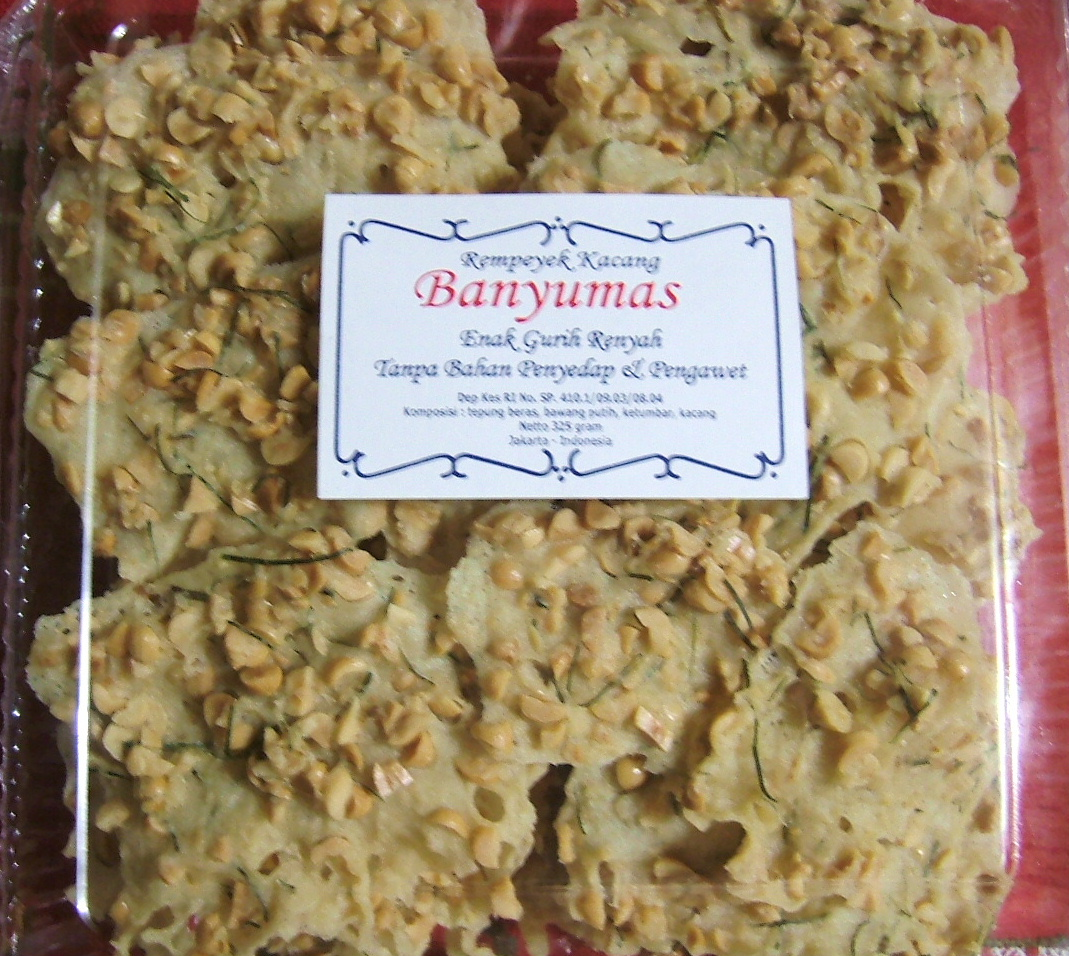
A box of Indonesian peanut rempeyek

Rempeyek is derived from the Javanese onomatopoeia peyek, depicting the sound of a crisp cracker breaking.

Rempeyek is often associated with Javanese cuisine, served to accompany pecel (vegetables in peanut sauce) or other meals or as a stand-alone snack. Today, it is common throughout Indonesia and is also popular in Malaysia following the migration of Javanese immigrants in the early 19th century.

== Variants ==
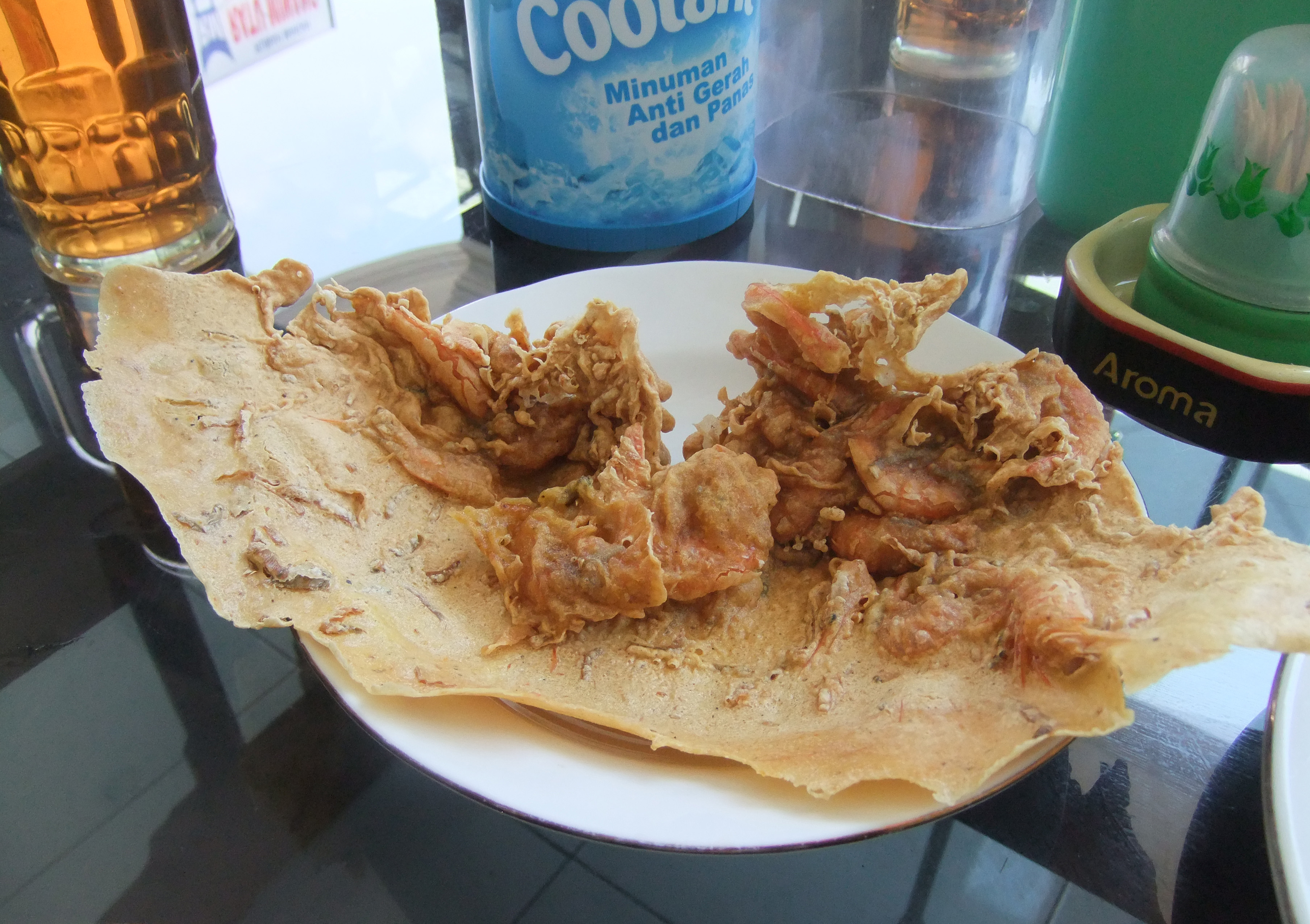
Rempeyek udang, shrimp rempeyek in a Padang restaurant

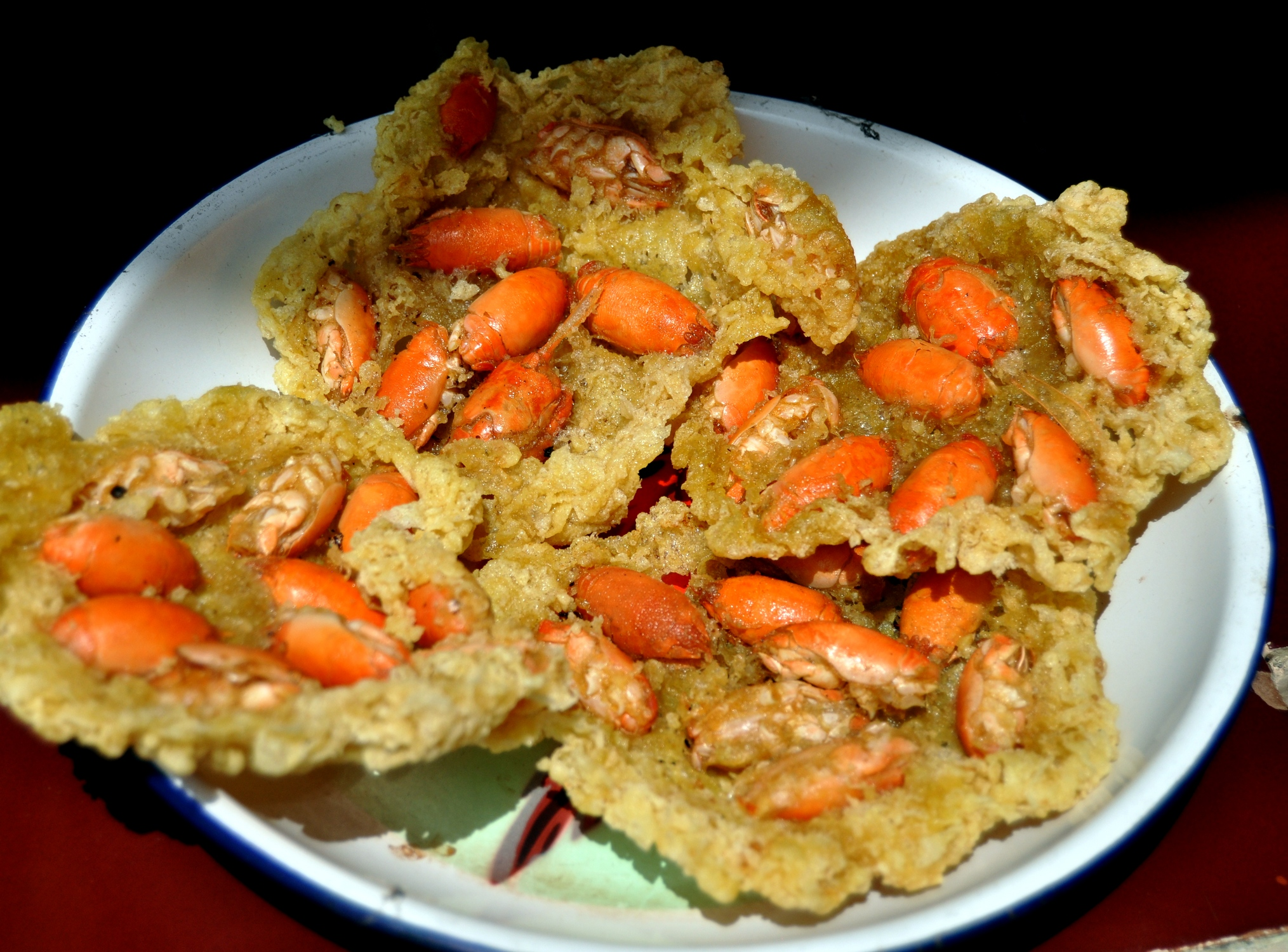
Rempeyek yutuk, mole crab rempeyek from Cilacap, Central Java

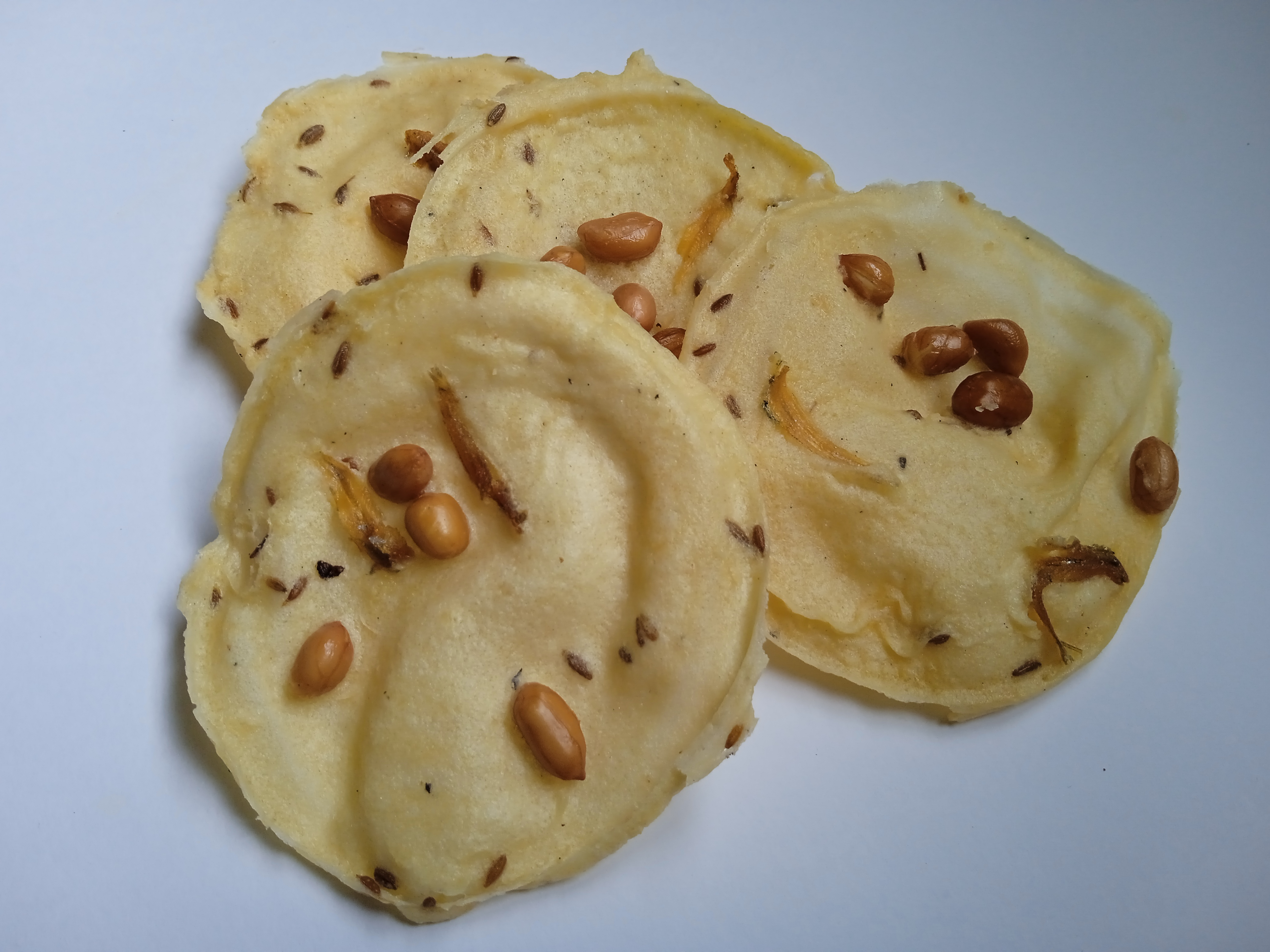
A small pack of Malaysian Rempeyek with peanuts and anchovies

The most common and widely distributed type of rempeyek is rempeyek kacang (peanut rempeyek); however, anchovy, small shrimp, dried shrimp, spinach (rempeyek bayam), and beans such as mung beans and soybeans are also common types. Rempeyek kacang is especially common in the Banyumas region of Central Java, while rempeyek rebon (small shrimp) is common in the Javanese port town of Cirebon. Rempeyek made with larger shrimp is commonly found in Padang restaurants.

The recent popularity of spicy food saw the use of sliced cabai rawit (bird's eye chili pepper) as rempeyek. There is also a regional specialty of rempeyek yutuk (mole crab), which can be found mostly in Central Java's southern coast towns, such as Cilacap. More niche variants with insect ingredients, such as crickets and termites, also exist.

== In popular culture ==
A popular Javanese song, Iwak Peyek, by female dangdut group Trio Macan, describes rempeyek as a commoners' dish. It served as the rallying song for supporters of Persebaya Football Club from Surabaya, East Java.

== See also ==
- Peanut brittle
- Krupuk
- Rengginang
