= Rice cracker =

Type of cracker

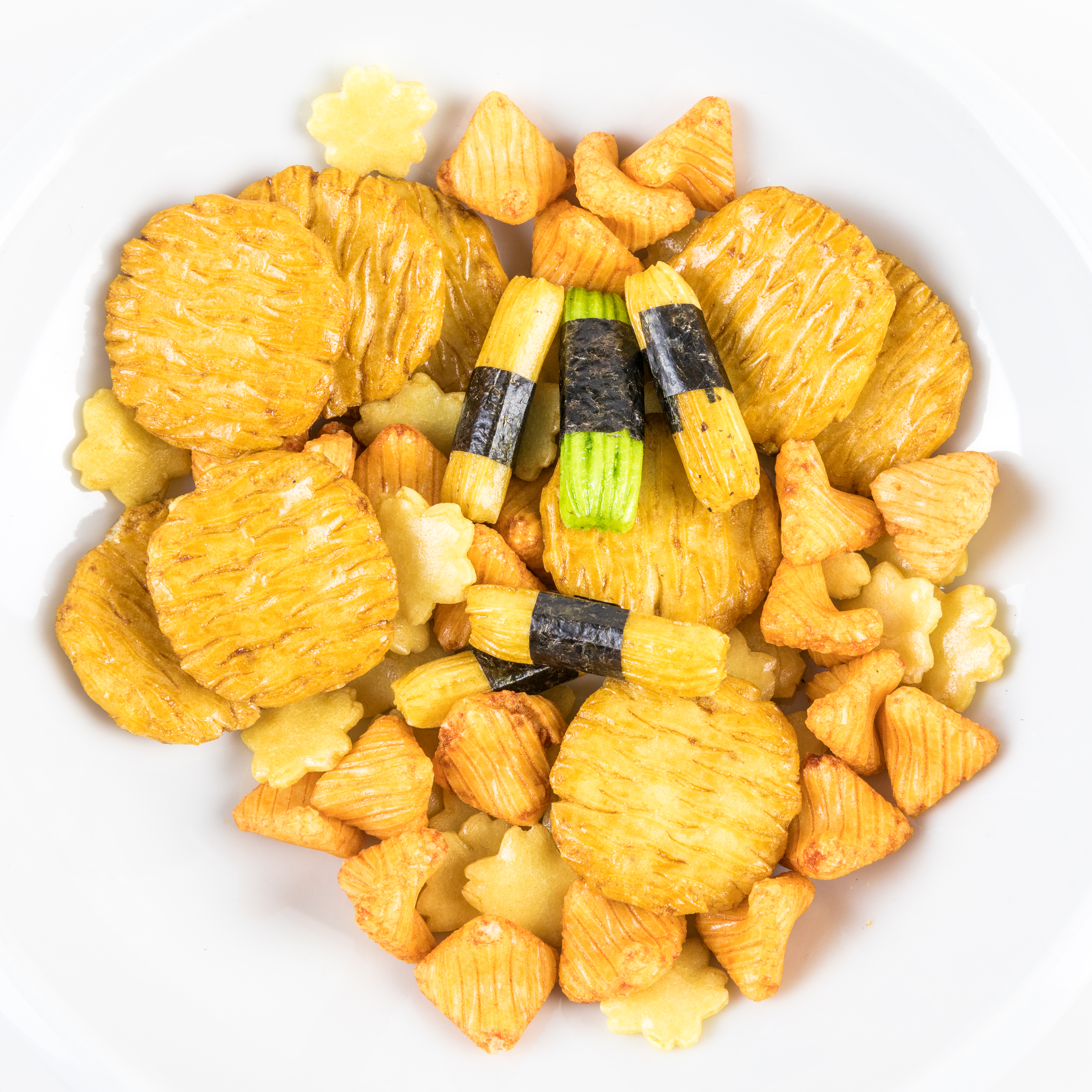
Rice crackers, assorted varieties

A rice cracker is an East Asian cracker made from cooked rice or rice flour. Many regional varieties exist, though most are fried or baked and puffed and/or brushed with soy sauce or vinegar to create a smooth texture. Some may also be wrapped in seaweed.

== Preparation ==
The rice flour is first steamed then pounded. After that, the paste is spread out and cut into uniform shapes. Eventually, the shaped paste is dried before being toasted or fried.

== History ==
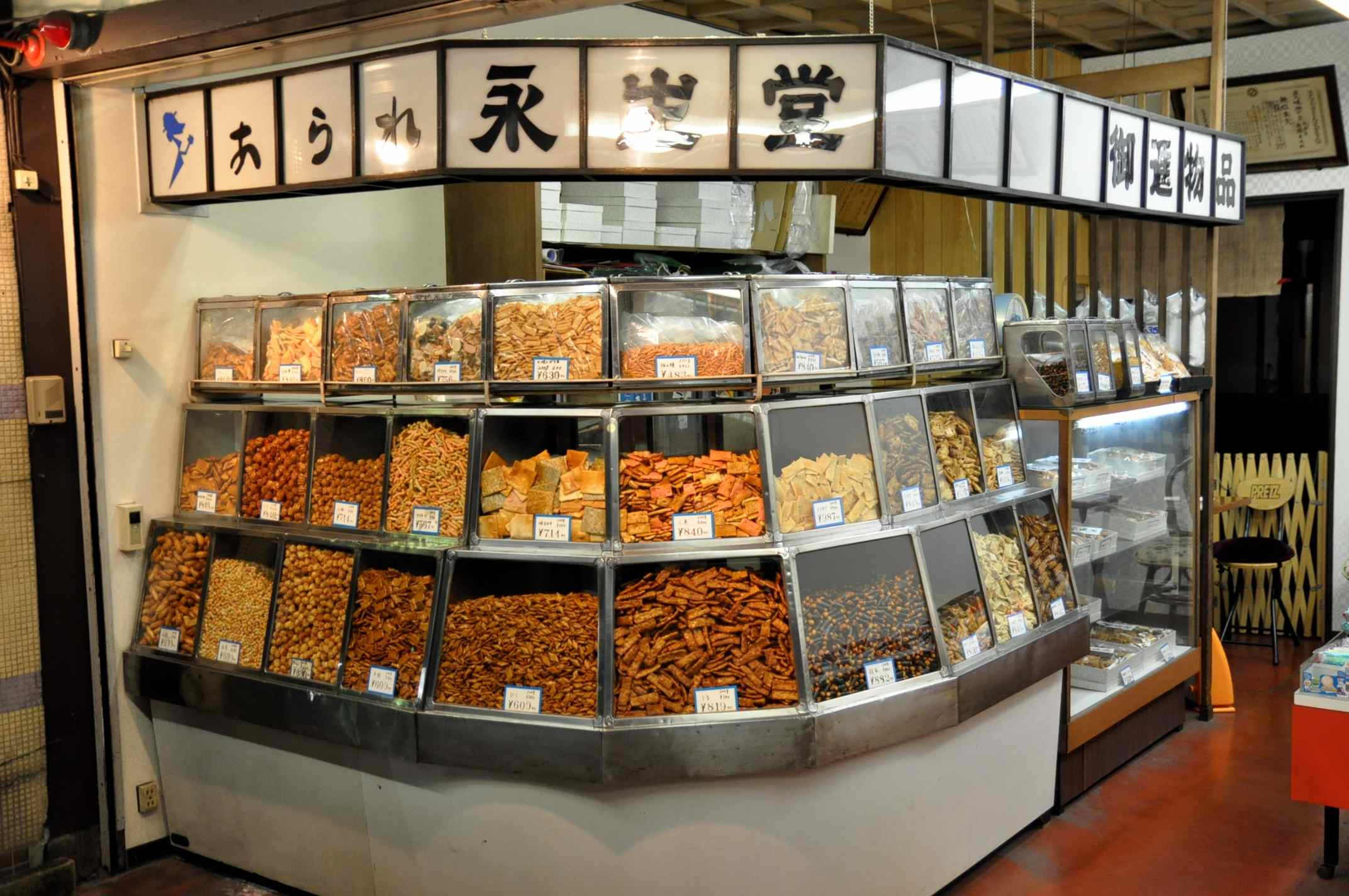
Shop selling various rice crackers in Japan

Rice crackers are thought to have originated during China's Han dynasty (c. 202 BC). Later, during the Tang dynasty, there are records of senbei being served to houseguests as a token of courtesy. In Japan, they were popularized during the Edo period. The Japanese Soka senbei (made in Soka City, Saitama Prefecture) is widely considered to be the first modern rice cracker.

== Serving ==
Rice crackers are traditionally served with soup or salad, along with green tea and/ or alcoholic beverages. In the western world, they are often eaten as a snack food in trail mixes along with ingredients such as wasabi peas, nuts, dried and salted edamame, and sesame sticks.

== Types ==
Rice crackers are produced in several varieties and shapes. Some of the most popular are listed below.

=== Cambodia ===
- Num kreab, a round, flat Cambodian rice cracker

=== Japan ===
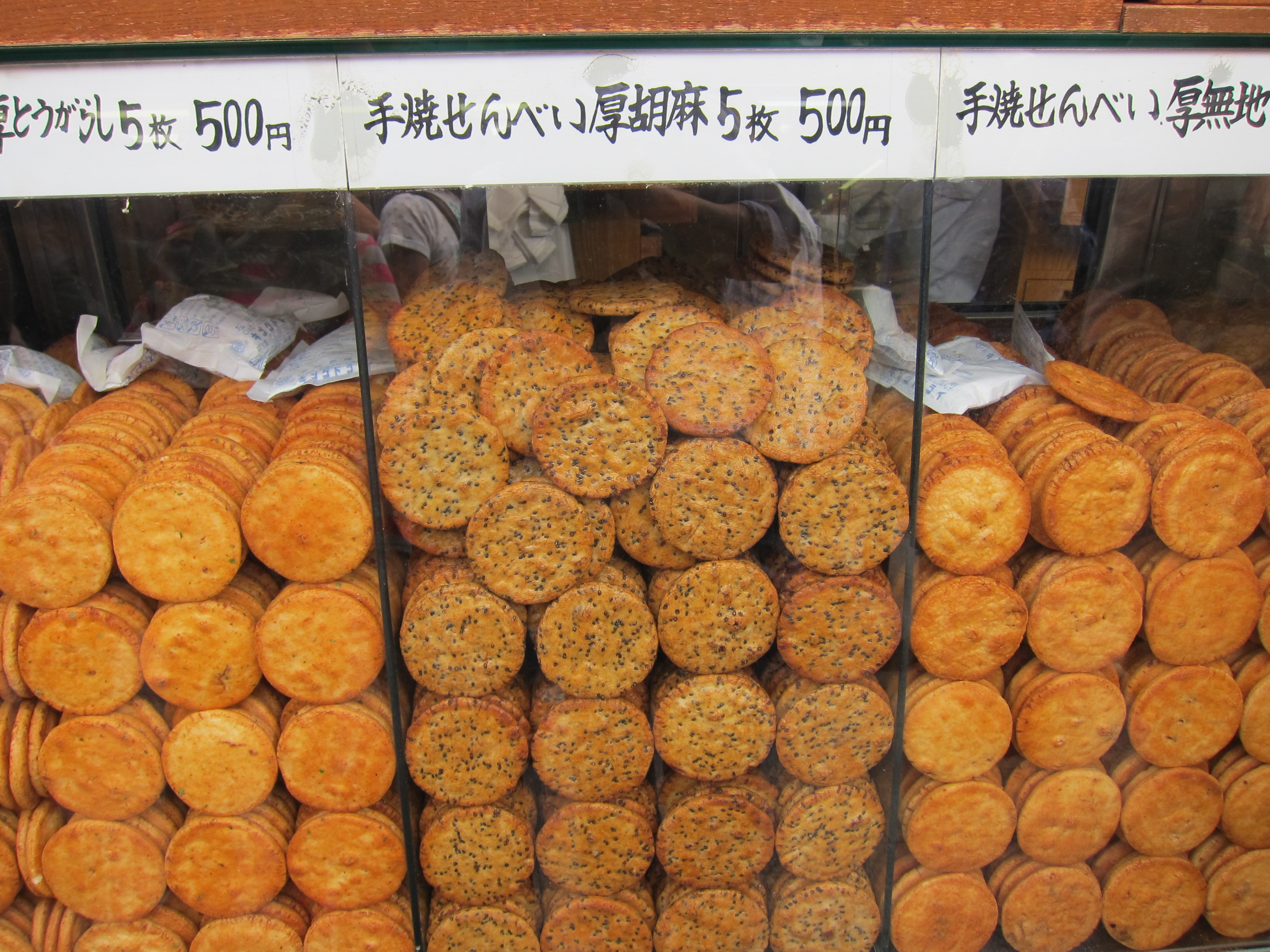
Senbei crackers on sale in Tokyo

- Beika (米菓), a dry Japanese confectionery made from rice
  - Arare (food) (あられ), a stone-shaped, bite-sized Japanese rice cracker
    - Oriibu no hana ('olive flower')
  - Senbei (せんべい), a flat disk-shaped, palm-sized cracker traditionally eaten with green tea
    - Shoyu senbei, a cracker brushed with soy sauce
    - Nori senbei, a cracker toasted and wrapped in dried sushi nori
    - Kuro goma senbei, a nutty cracker speckled with black sesame seeds
    - Togarashi senbei, a spicy cracker coated in red chili powder and flakes
    - Ika senbei, or Ika sen, a cracker baked with grilled squid
    - Ebi senbei, or Ebi sen, a cracker baked with minced shrimp
    - Kuromame senbei, a cracker made with dough mixed with black soybeans
    - Zarame senbei, a cracker sprinkled with crystals of sugar
  - Kaki no tane, a small, seasoned crescent-shape snack that bears a resemblance to peanuts
- Korenya shingetsuan, made with sasanishiki rice from Miyagi prefecture into a thin rice cakes grilled over charcoal. It has a faint sweetness of rice, and melts immediately when you put it in your mouth. The manufacturing method has been passed down through the generations, and is currently being made by Minoru Hoshi, the 23rd generation. The only ingredients are Uruchi rice (Sasanishiki), caster sugar, and table salt (Hakata salt).

=== Indonesia ===
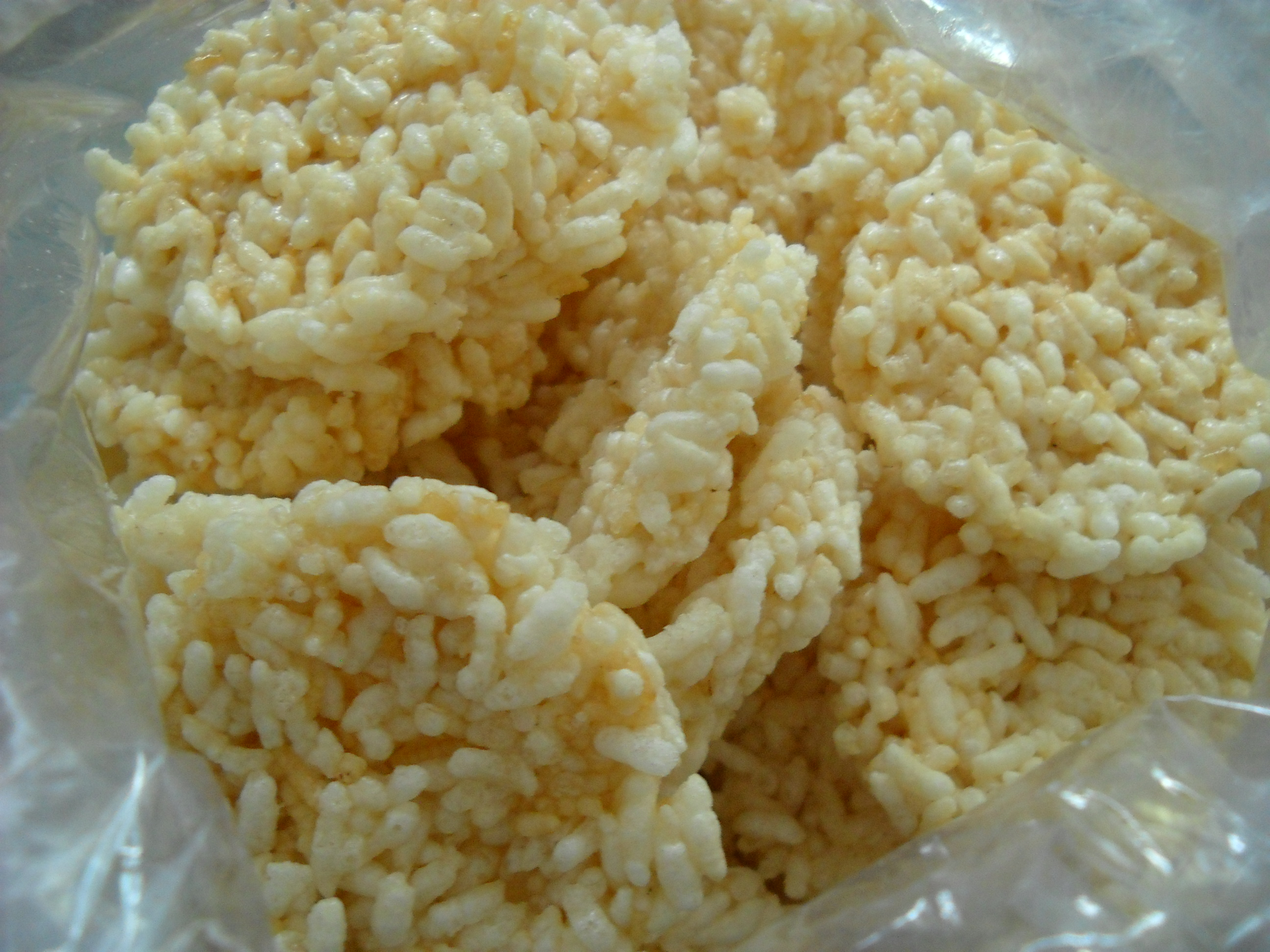
Rengginang, Indonesian glutinous rice cracker

- Krupuk gendar, also known as krupuk puli, krupuk karak, krupuk beras, or krupuk nasi, is an Indonesian style ground rice cracker commonly found in Java island.
- Rengginang, a thick cracker made with sticky rice granules.

== See also ==
- Puffed grain
  - Puffed rice
- Rice flour
