= Senbei =

Japanese rice cracker

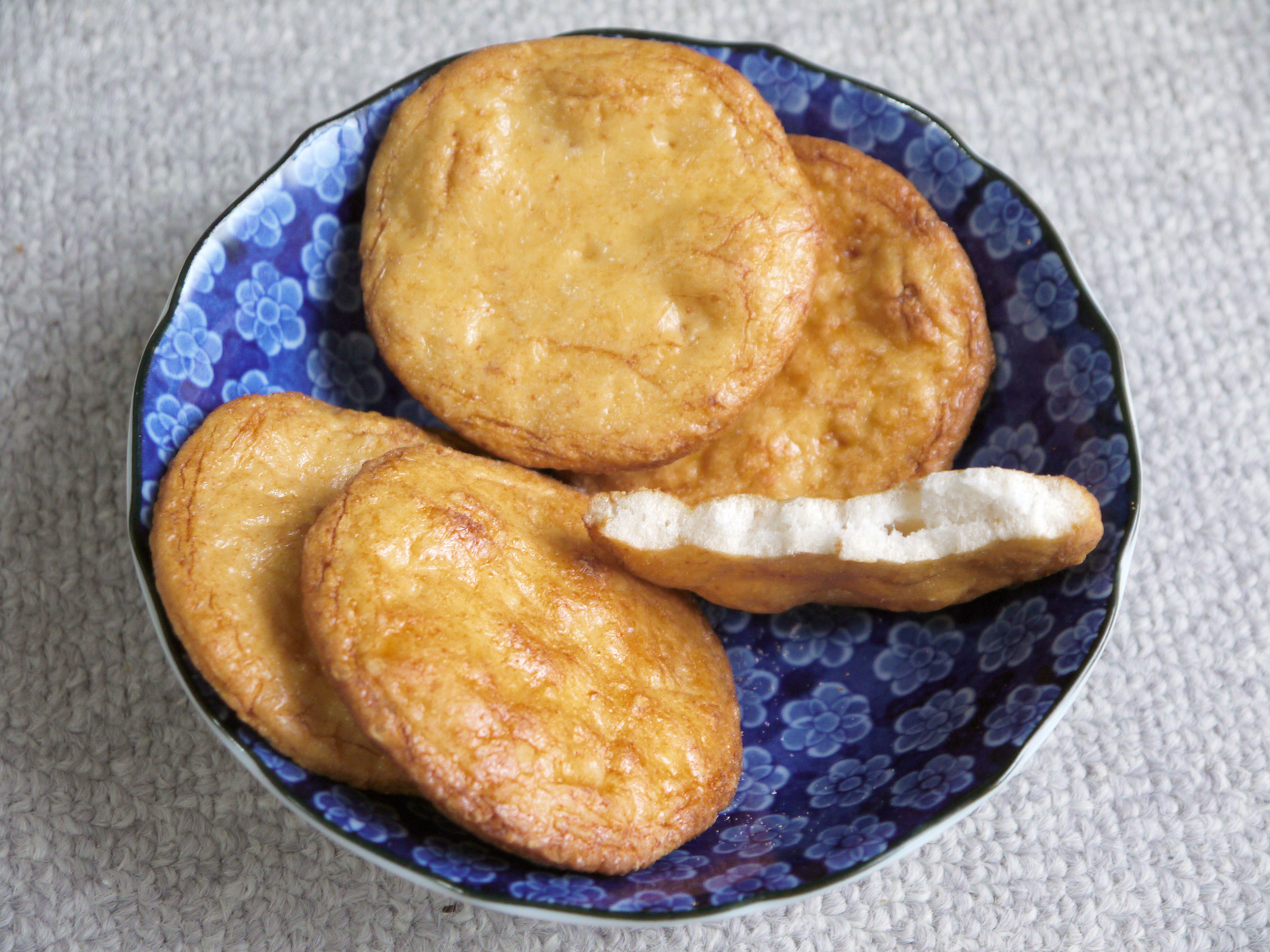
- Standard senbei and a cross-section view
- Alternative names: Sembei
- Type: Rice cracker
- Place of origin: Japan
- Region or state: East Asia
- Main ingredients: Japanese rice (uruchimai)

Senbei

Japanese name
- Kanji: 煎餅
- Hiragana: せんべい
Transcriptions
- Romanization: senbei

Senbei (煎餅), also spelled sembei, is a type of Japanese rice cracker. They come in various shapes, sizes, and flavors, usually savory but sometimes sweet. Senbei are often eaten with green tea as a casual snack and offered to visiting house guests as a courtesy refreshment.

There are several types of traditional Japanese senbei. They can be baked or deep-fried and sometimes sweetened. Aside from rice, wheat flour or starch can be used. Some varieties even use foods other than grains, such as sakana senbei (fish-senbei), renkon senbei (lotus root senbei) and hone senbei (bone-senbei).

Senbei have several variations, including nori-wrapped, arare, Olive no Hana, soy nut, and wet. Thin rice crackers (薄焼きせんべい usuyaki senbei) are popular in Australia and other countries.

In China, the same characters used to write senbei are read jiānbǐng (煎饼; 煎餅; jiānbǐng); the term instead refers to a crepe and is more similar in preparation to okonomiyaki among Japanese foods. In Japan, senbei are hard and crispy, and are bite-sized snacks rather than street-food meals. However, crackers similar to Japanese senbei can be found in China today and their modern Chinese name is 仙贝; 仙貝; xiānbèi, which reflects the Japanese-language pronunciation of "senbei" (煎餅).

== Preparation ==
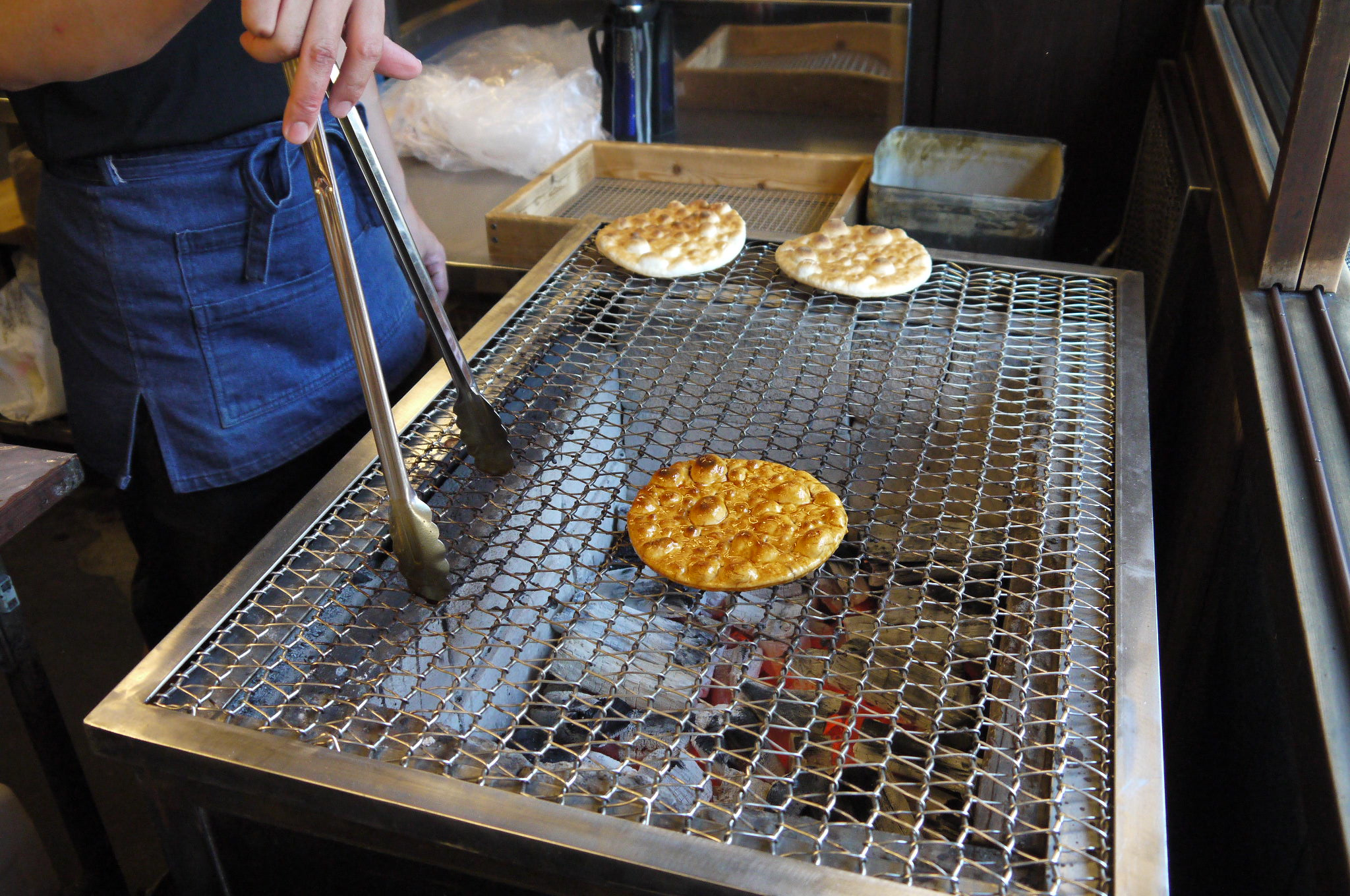
Senbei being grilled

Senbei are made from glutinous rice which has been steamed for 15 to 20 minutes before being pounded into dough. After several days of refrigeration, the dough is cut into shapes.

Senbei are usually cooked by being baked or grilled, traditionally over charcoal. While being prepared they may be brushed with a flavoring sauce, often one made of soy sauce and mirin. They may then be wrapped with a layer of nori. Alternatively they may be flavored with salt or "salad" flavoring, among others.

== History ==
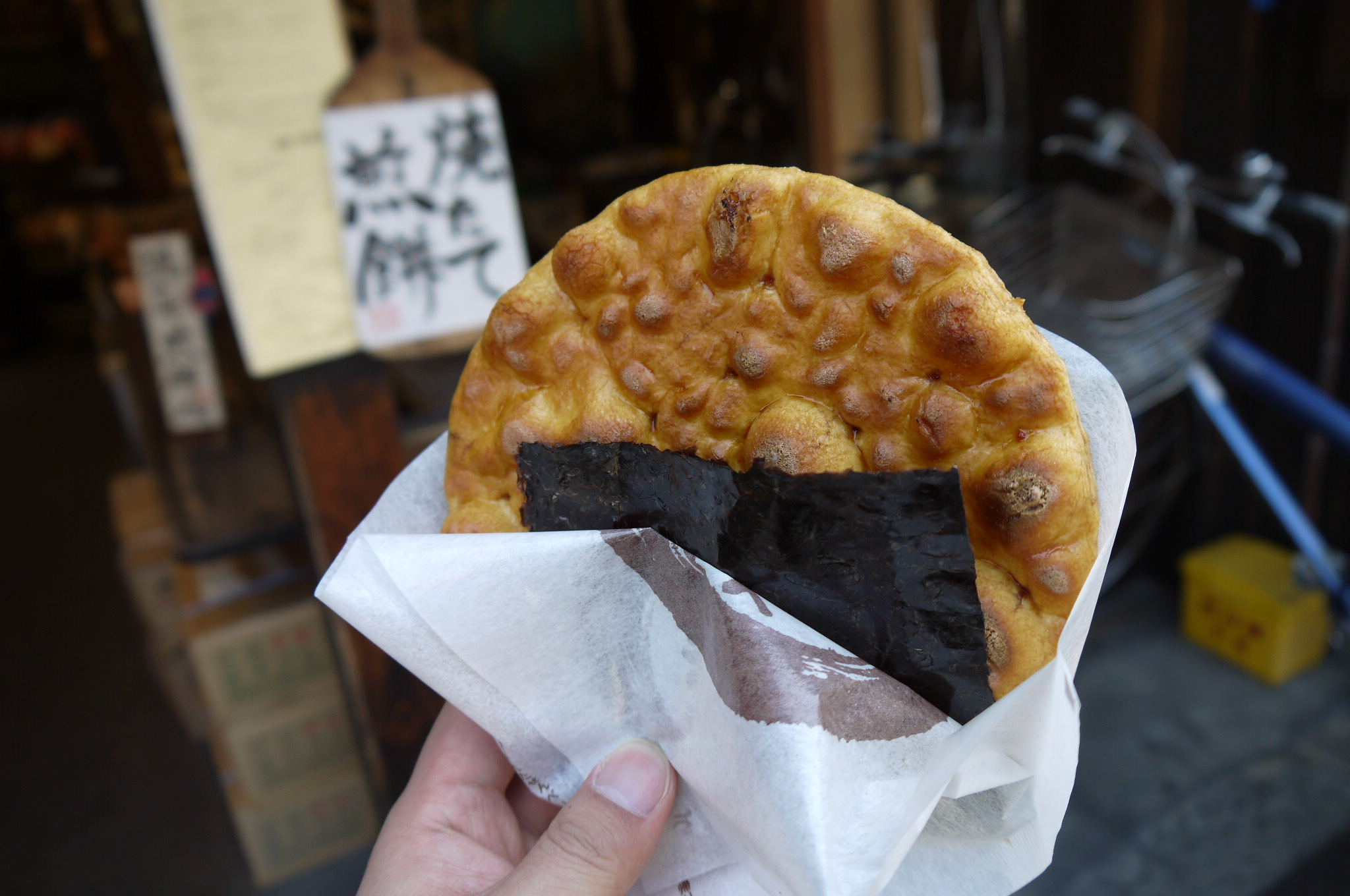
Senbei with nori wrapper

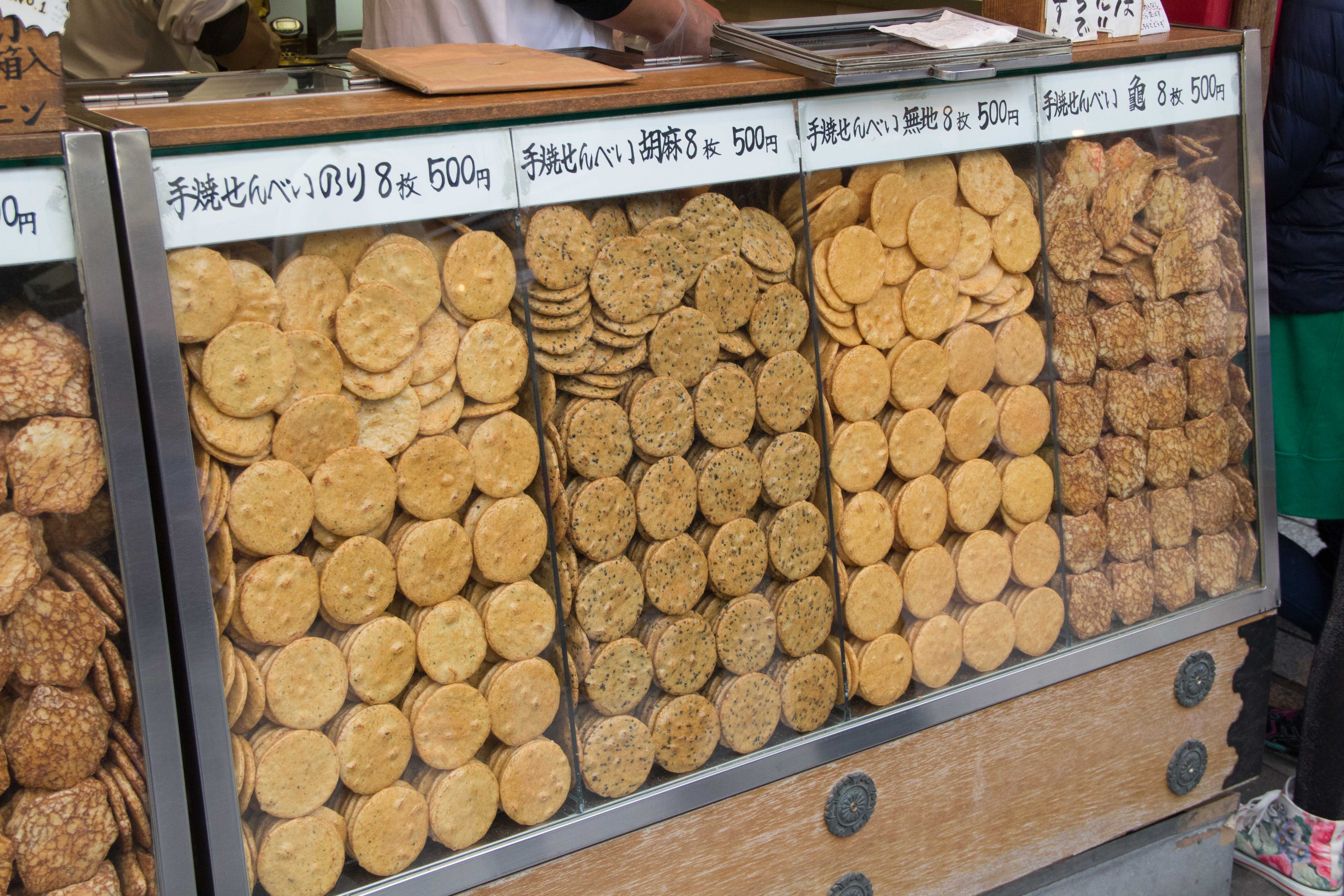
Senbei sold at a store in Tokyo

Sweet senbei (甘味煎餅) came to Japan during the Tang dynasty, with the first recorded usage in 737 AD, and still are very similar to Tang traditional styles, originally often baked in the Kansai area, of which include the traditional "roof tile" senbei. These include ingredients like potato and wheat flour or glutinous rice, and are similar to castella cakes, distinctly different from what most people would consider as senbei today, though traditional senbei such as this can still be found, e.g. Iga meibutsu katayaki, in Iga City.

What Japanese commonly refer to as senbei nowadays were popularized by a teahouse in Sōka city in the Edo period, which spread salty soy sauce flavored senbei throughout Japan.

Modern senbei versions are very inventive and may include flavorings which can range from kimchi to wasabi to curry to chocolate.

Kansai senbei tend to use glutinous rice and are lightly seasoned and delicate in texture (saku saku). Kantō senbei were originally based on uruchimai, a non-glutinous rice, and they tend to be more crunchy (kari kari) and richly flavored.

== Types ==
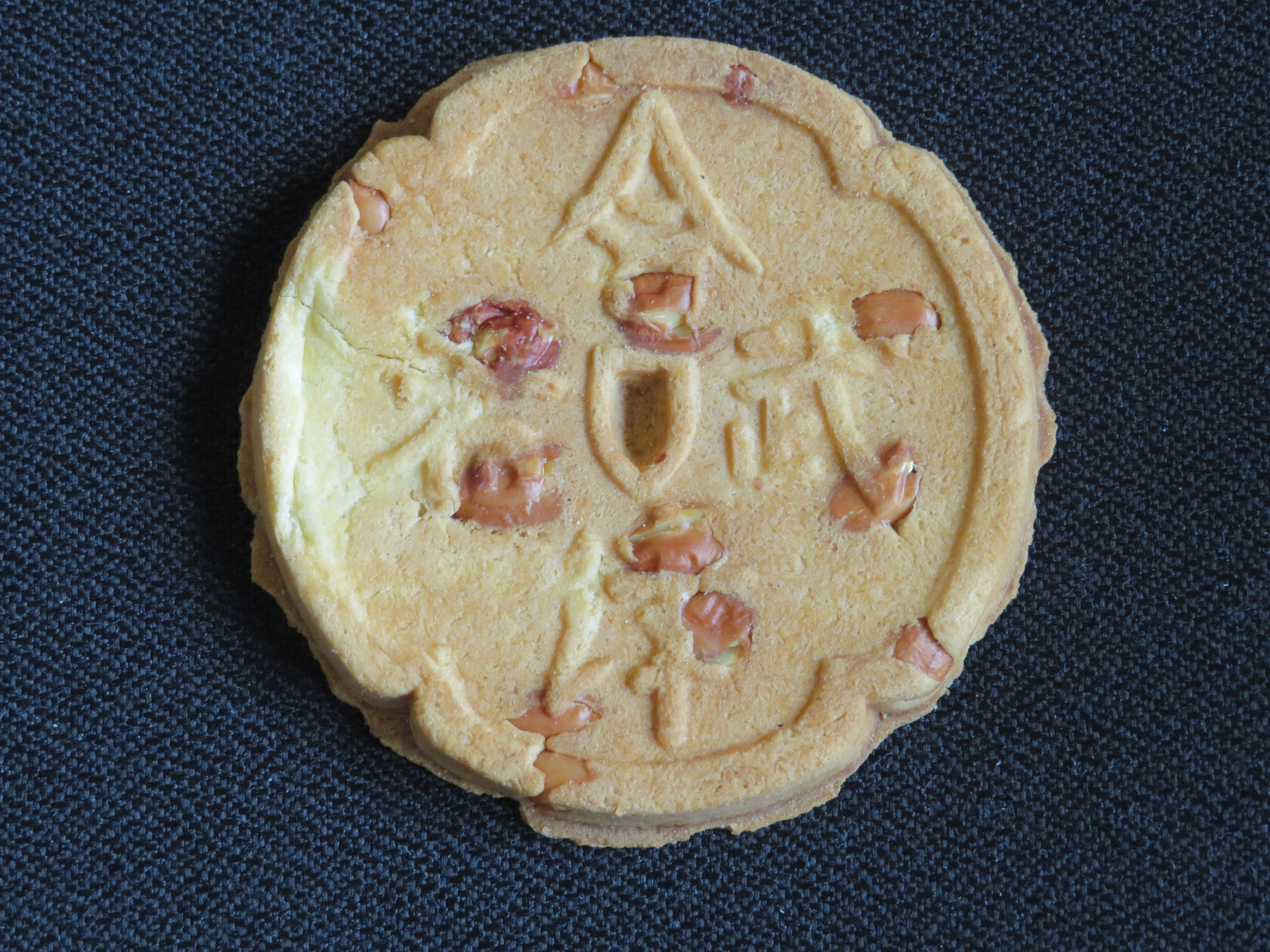
Musha-senbei, with peanuts

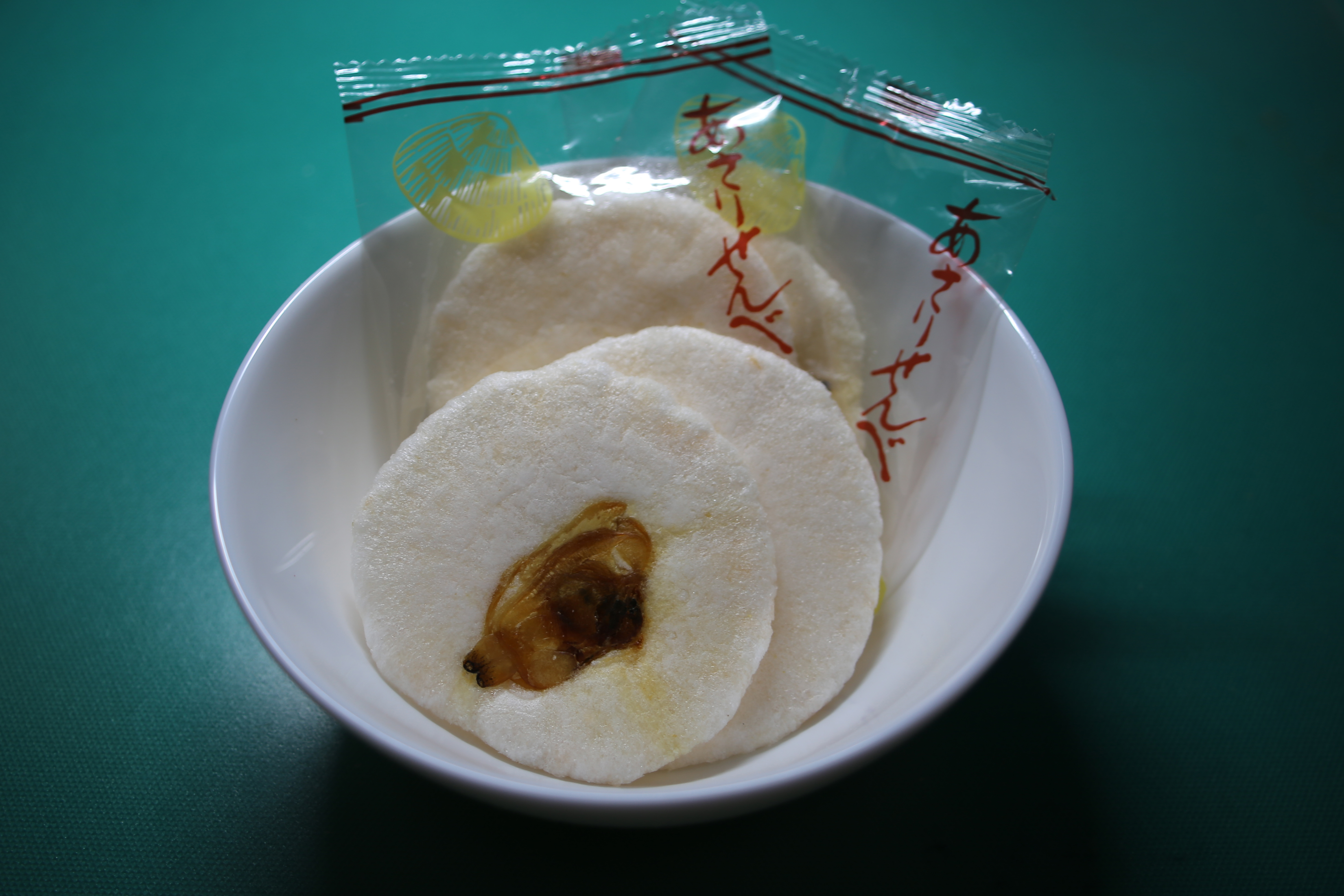
Asari-senbei, with dried asari clam

Senbei sometimes has ingredients baked in, including dried seafood such as shrimp or clams.

- Age senbei (fried senbei)
- Asari senbei (asari clam senbei)
- Atsuyaki senbei (thick senbei)
- Ebi senbei (shrimp senbei)
- Katayaki senbei (hard baked senbei), allegedly eaten by ninjas
- Kometsubu senbei (grains of rice senbei)
- Musha senbei (warrior's senbei), with peanuts baked in
- Nori senbei (seaweed senbei)
- Nanbu senbei (southern senbei), made with wheat flour
- Nure senbei (wet senbei)
- Satou senbei (sugar senbei)
- Salad senbei (salad flavored senbei)
- Shika senbei (deer senbei), meant for feeding deer in Nara Park
- Tako senbei (octopus senbei)
- Usuyaki senbei (thin senbei)
- Zarame senbei (granulated sugar senbei)
- Kaki no tane (senbei bits)
- Jibachi senbei (senbei with dried wasps)
- Onigiri senbei, shaped like onigiri (rice balls)

== Gallery ==
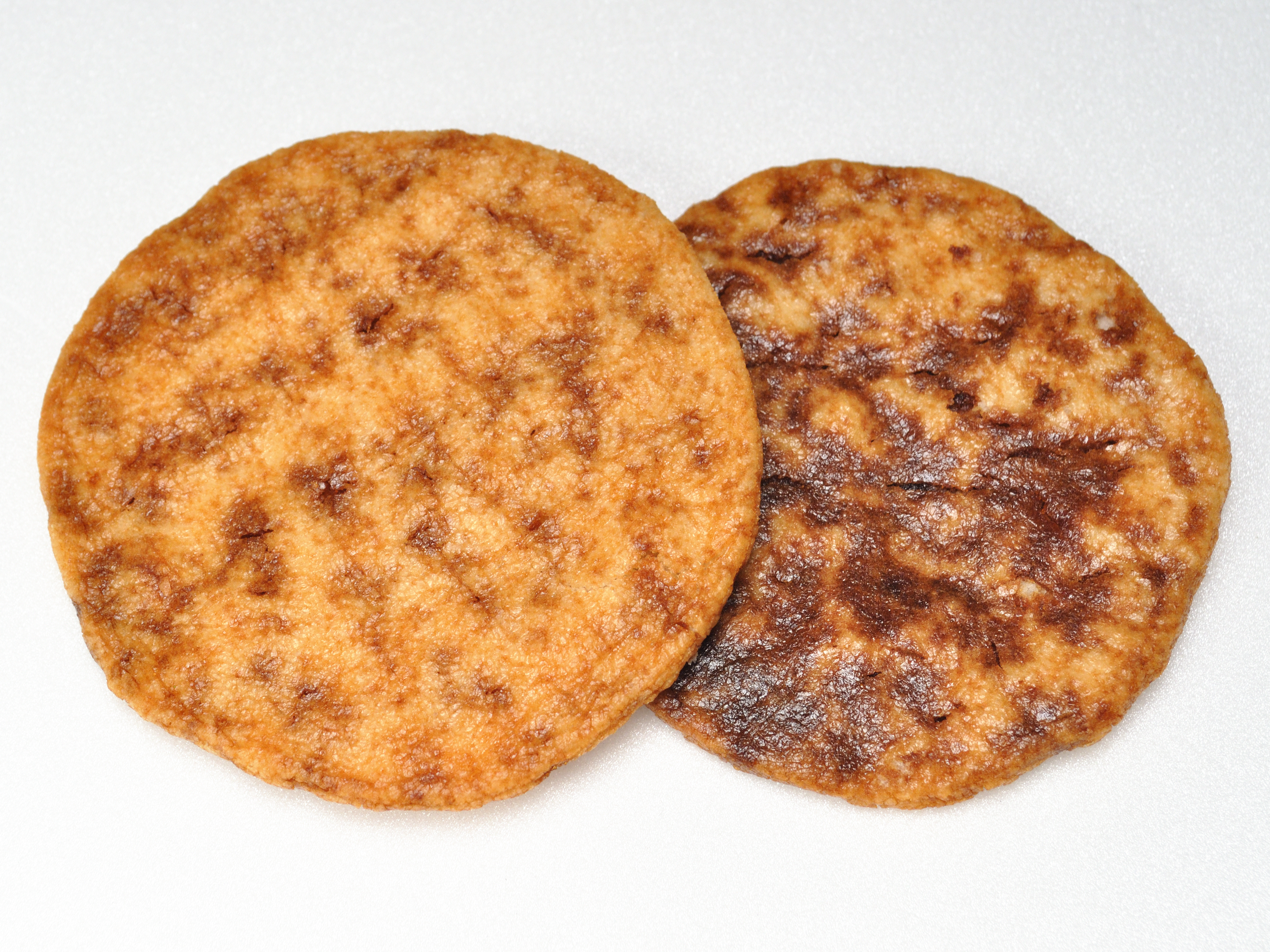
Nure-senbei, or wet senbei with soy sauce

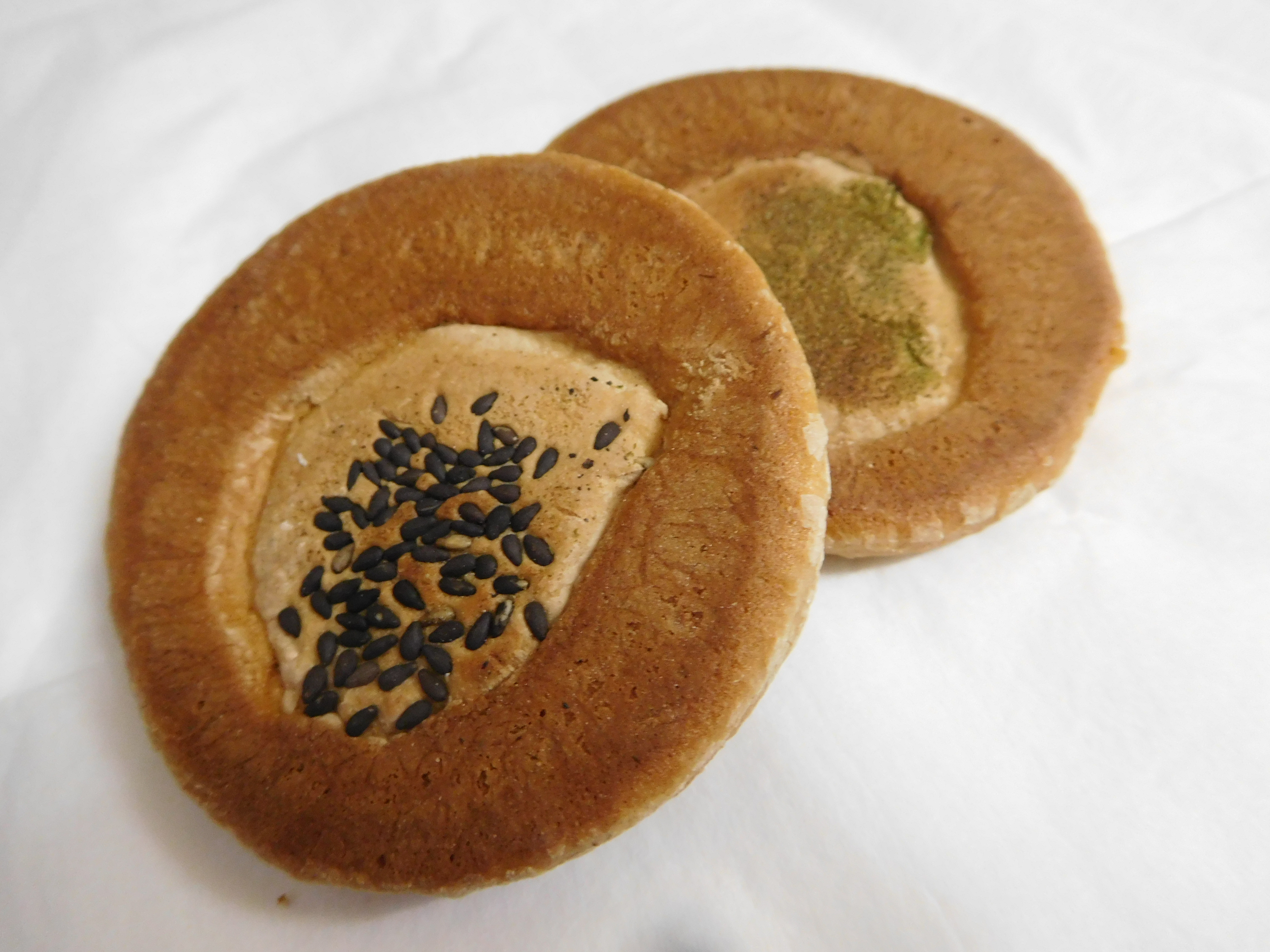
Katayaki-senbei, or extra hard senbei allegedly eaten by ninjas

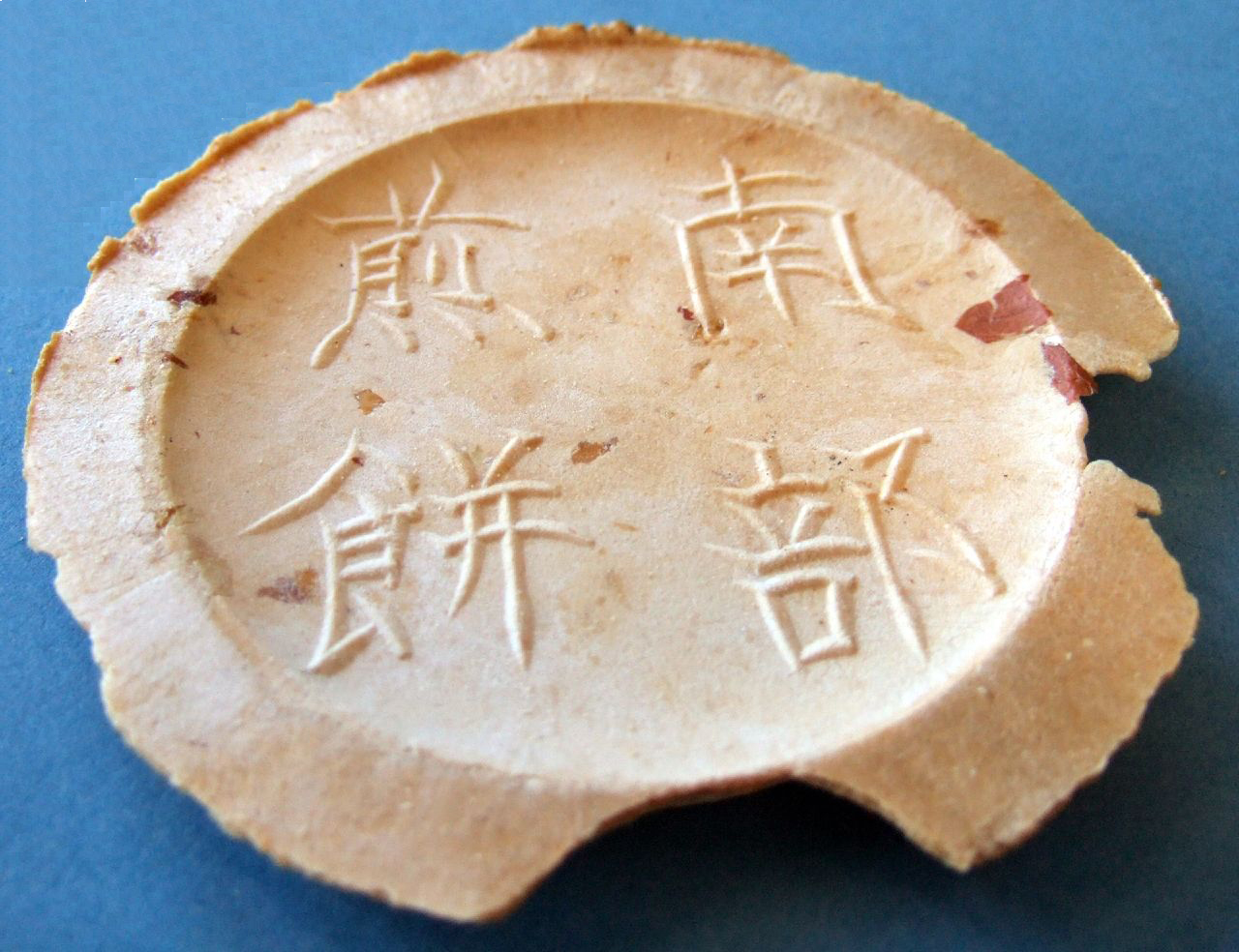
Nanbu-senbei, made with wheat flour

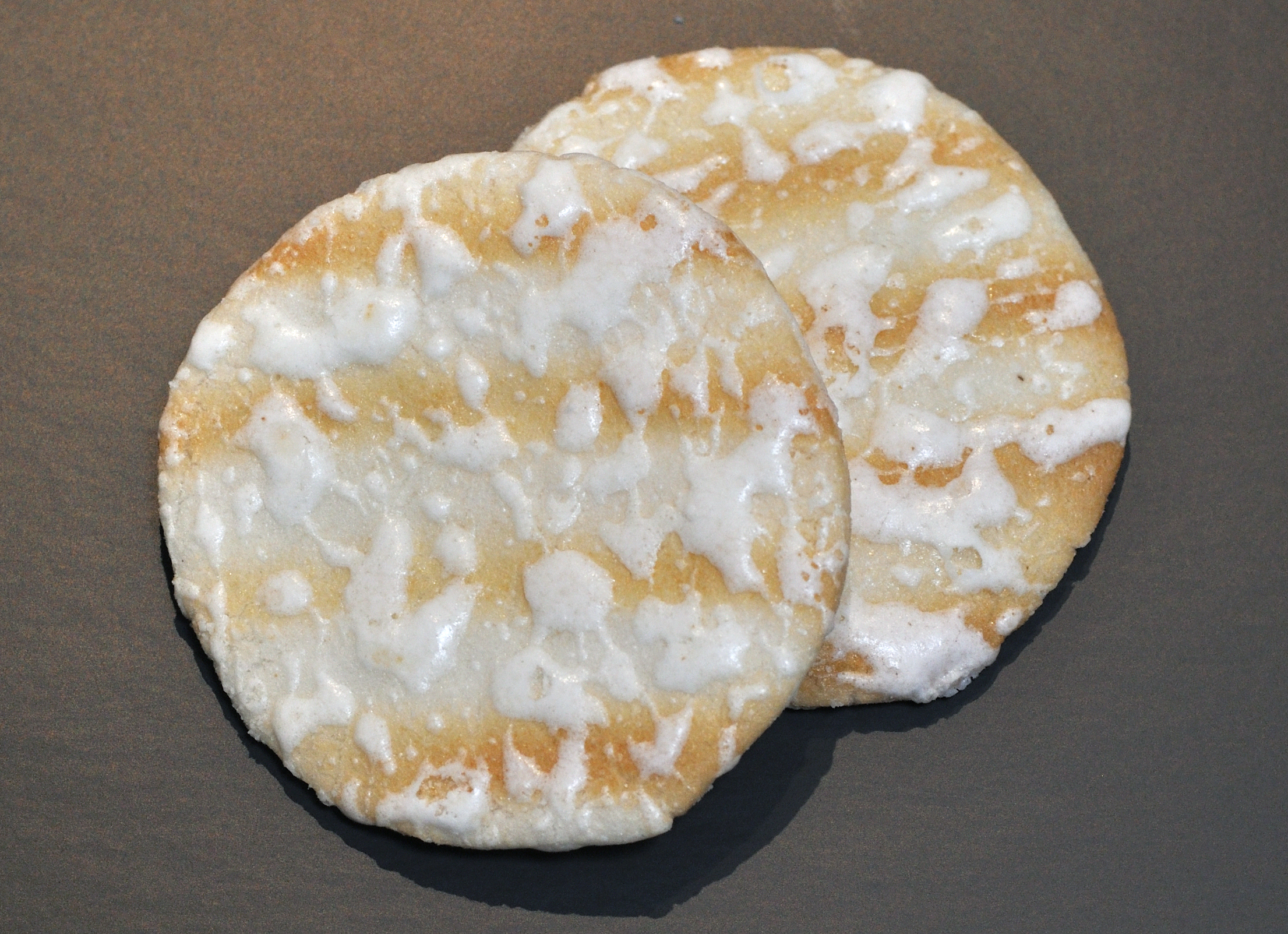
Yuki no yado, with sugar frosting

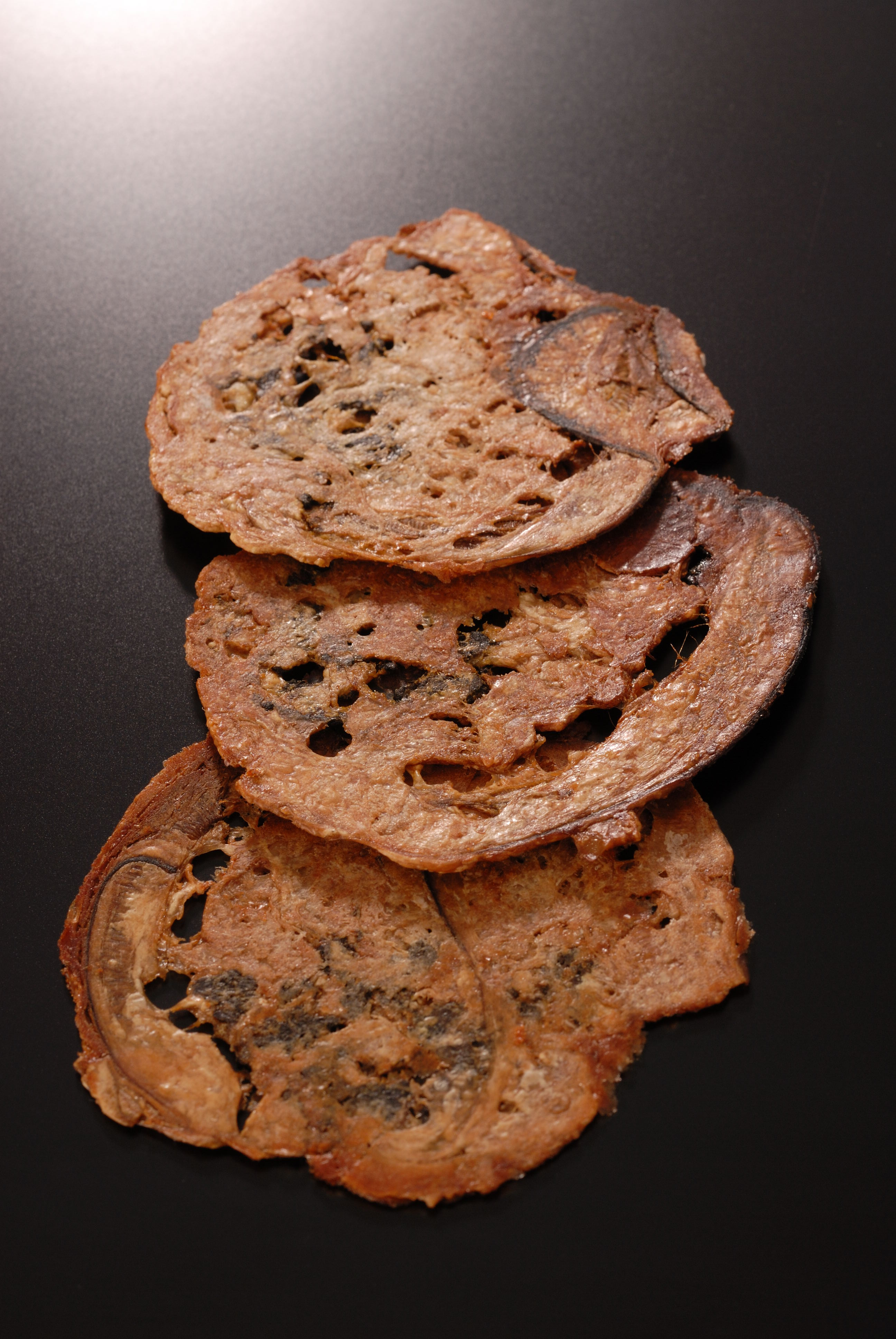
Shiboriyaki-senbei, with dried oyster

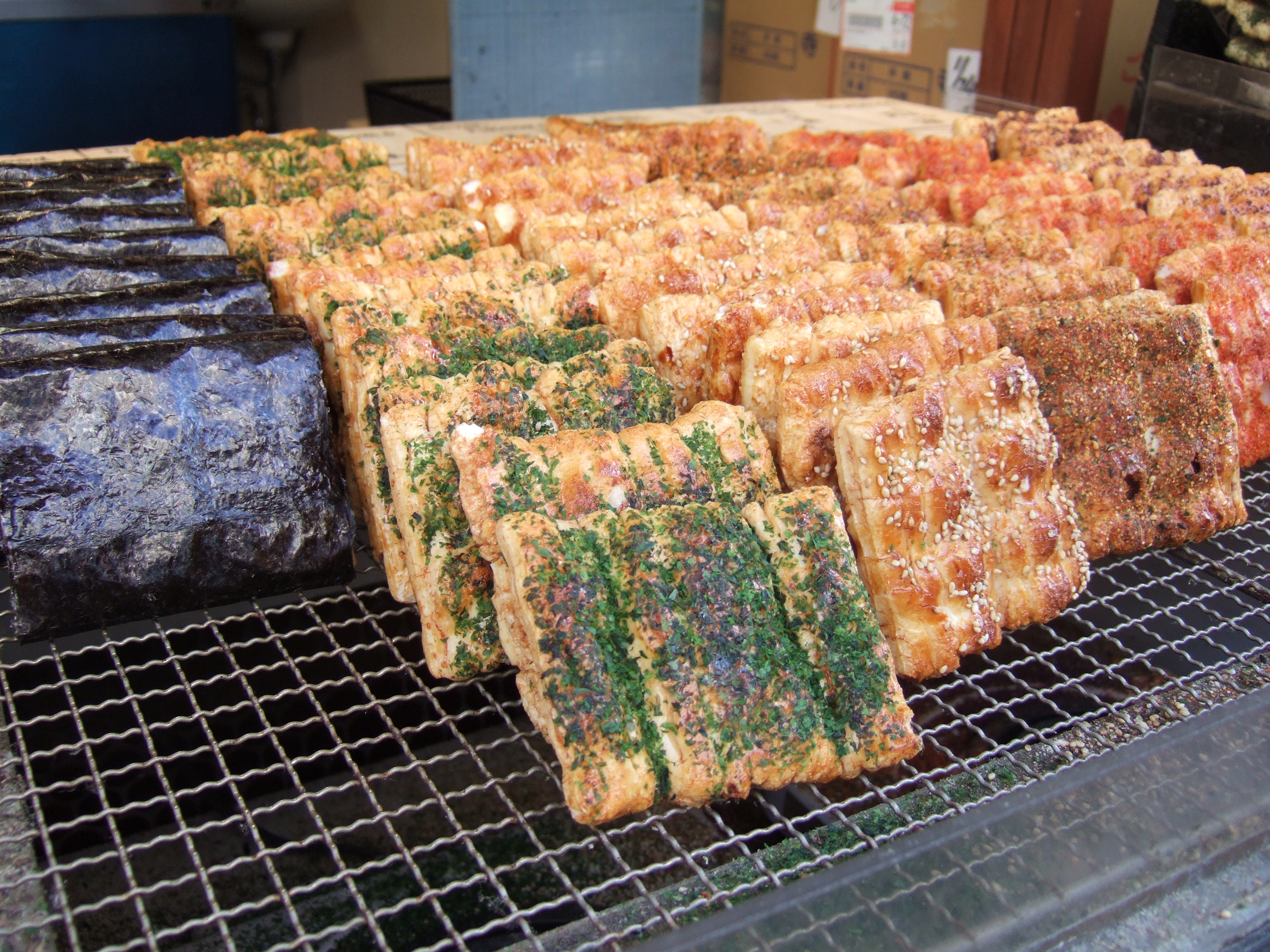
Senbei with aonori powder (middle)

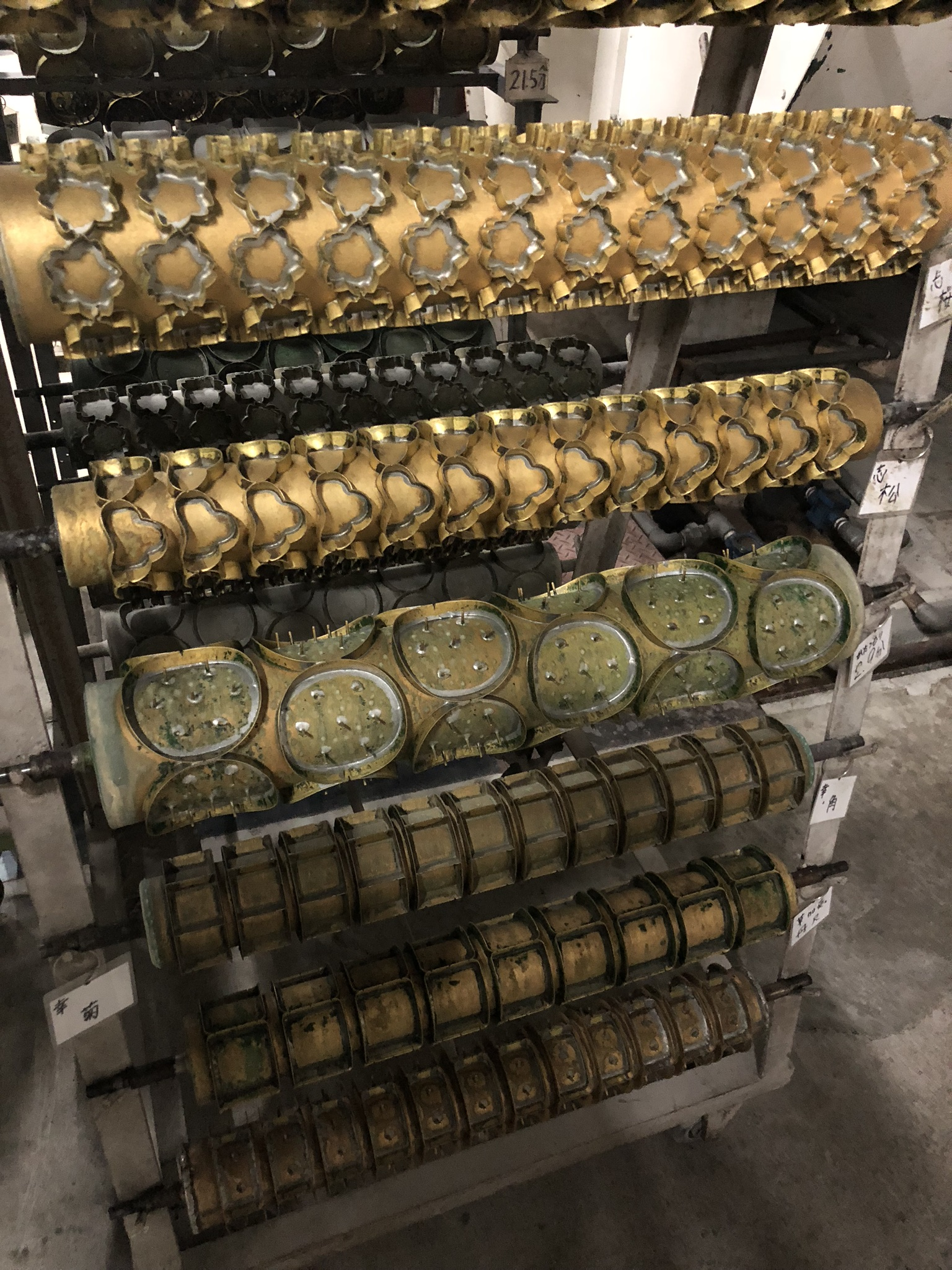
Metal rollers for making senbei in various shapes

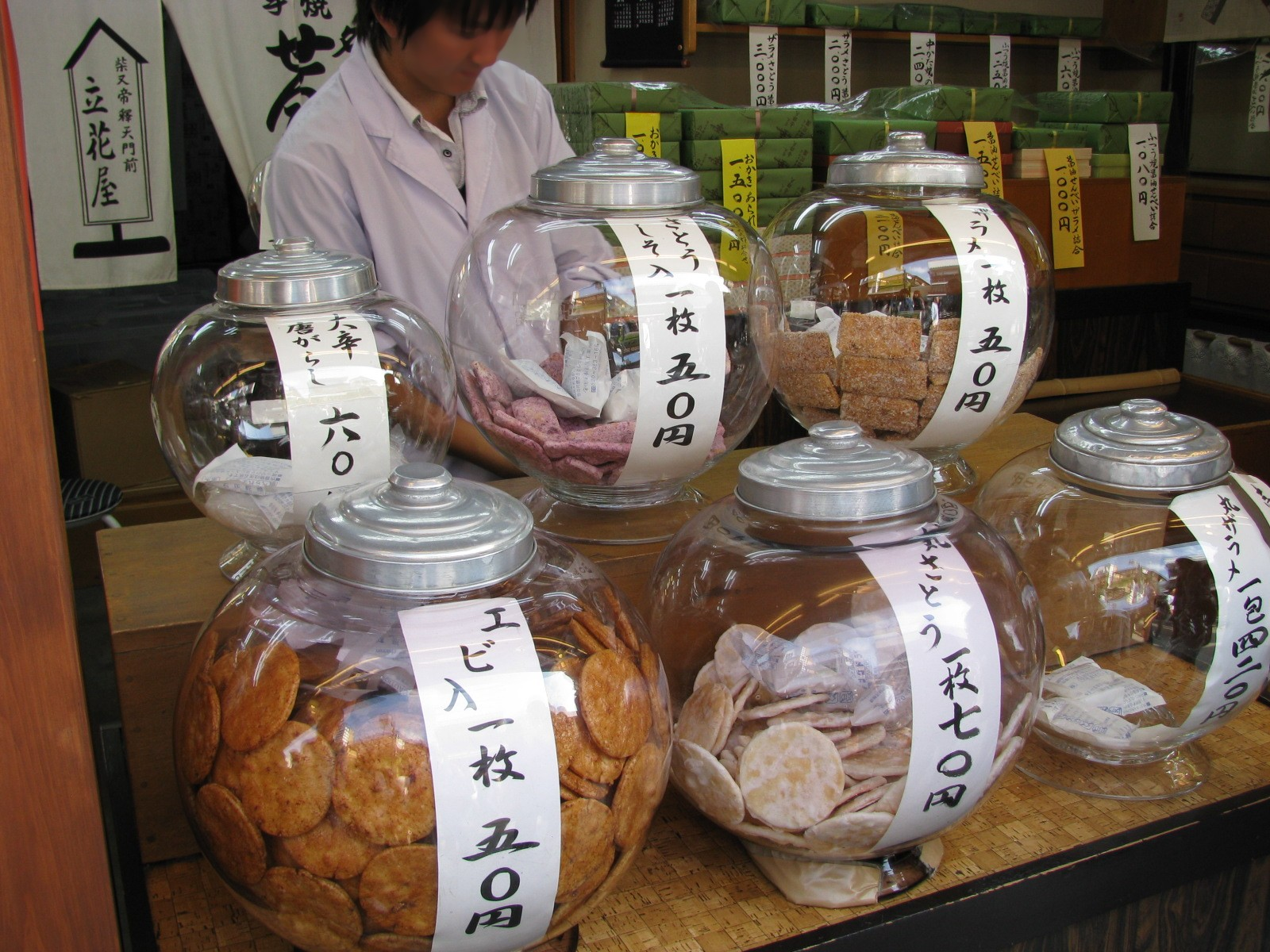

== See also ==
- Bakauke, a brand of senbei
- Sōka, Saitama, a famous senbei city
- Tamasen (senbei with fried egg)
