= Olive no Hana =

Type of Japanese rice cracker

オリーブの花 (Olive no Hana)
- Type: Rice cracker
- Place of origin: Japan
- Region or state: Hyōgo Prefecture
- Created by: Uegakibeika Co. Ltd.
- Main ingredients: Rice flour

Olive flower (オリーブの花, Olive no Hana) is one type of bite-sized Japanese rice cracker (arare) which is made by Uegakibeika Co. Ltd. (Note: (植垣米菓株式会社, Uegaki beika kabushiki gaisha)) in Hyōgo Prefecture in Japan. It is an assortment of crackers which has many savory flavors, squares of edible kelp (kombu) and dried, thick edible seaweed (nori).
