= Kaki no tane =

Japanese snack food

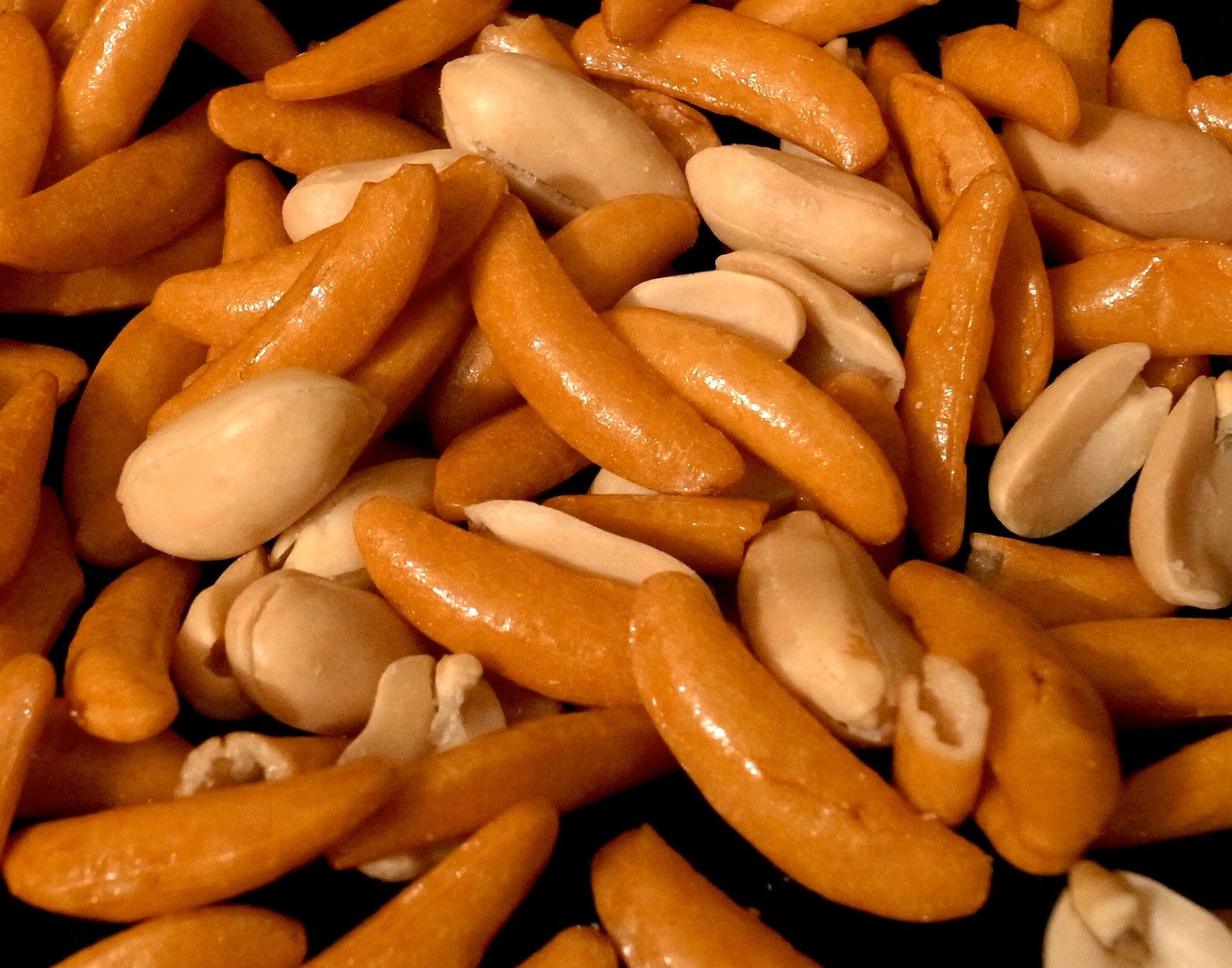
- Kaki-peanuts
- Alternative names: Kaki-peanuts, Kaki-pi
- Type: Rice cracker
- Place of origin: Japan
- Region or state: Nagaoka, Niigata
- Main ingredients: Peanuts

Kaki no tane or Kaki-pi are a common snack in Japan. The two elements of kaki-pi or kaki-no-tane (柿の種) are small crescent-shaped fragments of senbei (soy-flavored rice crisps), and peanuts. They are often consumed with beer and are sometimes a bar snack. Kaki-pi has several different types of flavors, such as wasabi, pepper, amongst others. The name comes from the fact that the pieces of senbei look like a seed (種, tane) of the persimmon (柿, kaki). The "pi" is an abbreviation of piinattsu (ピーナッツ), or "peanuts". In 2017 the food was officially certified "Space Japanese Food" by the JAXA.

== See also ==
- Japanese-style peanuts
