= Fish cracker =

Indonesian deep fried crackers

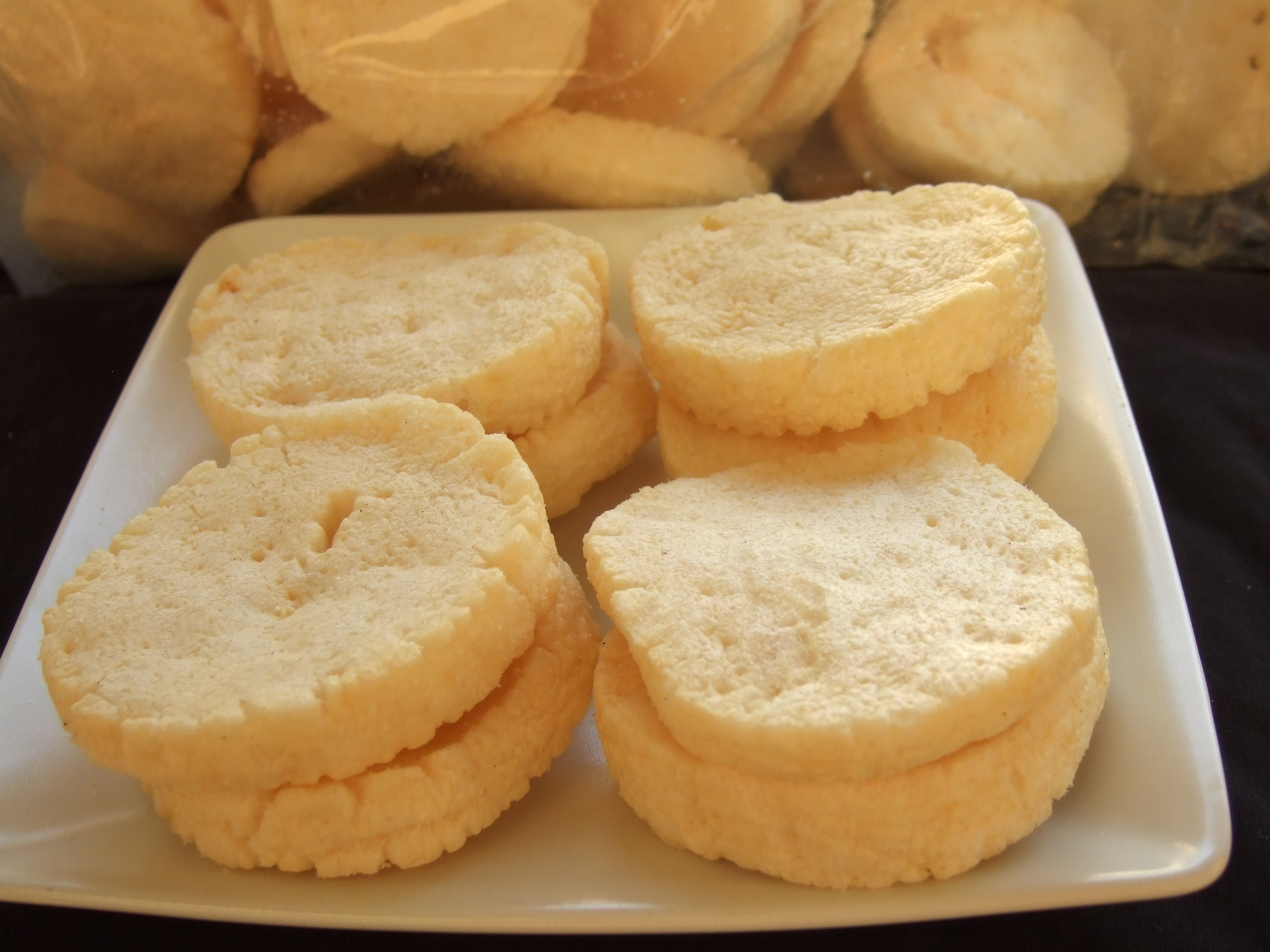
- Fish crackers
- Alternative names: Krupuk ikan
- Course: Snack
- Place of origin: Indonesia
- Region or state: Southeast Asia
- Serving temperature: Room temperature
- Main ingredients: Fish, tapioca starch, spices and other ingredients
- Variations: Different variations according to ingredients

Fish crackers are deep-fried crackers made from fish and spices, originating from Indonesia. The crackers are made mainly with tapioca flour and/or sago flour and then salt, sugar, and MSG as seasonings. Fish crackers can be found throughout Southeast Asia and East Asia. However, they are more commonly found and of greater variety in Indonesia and Malaysia.

== Types ==
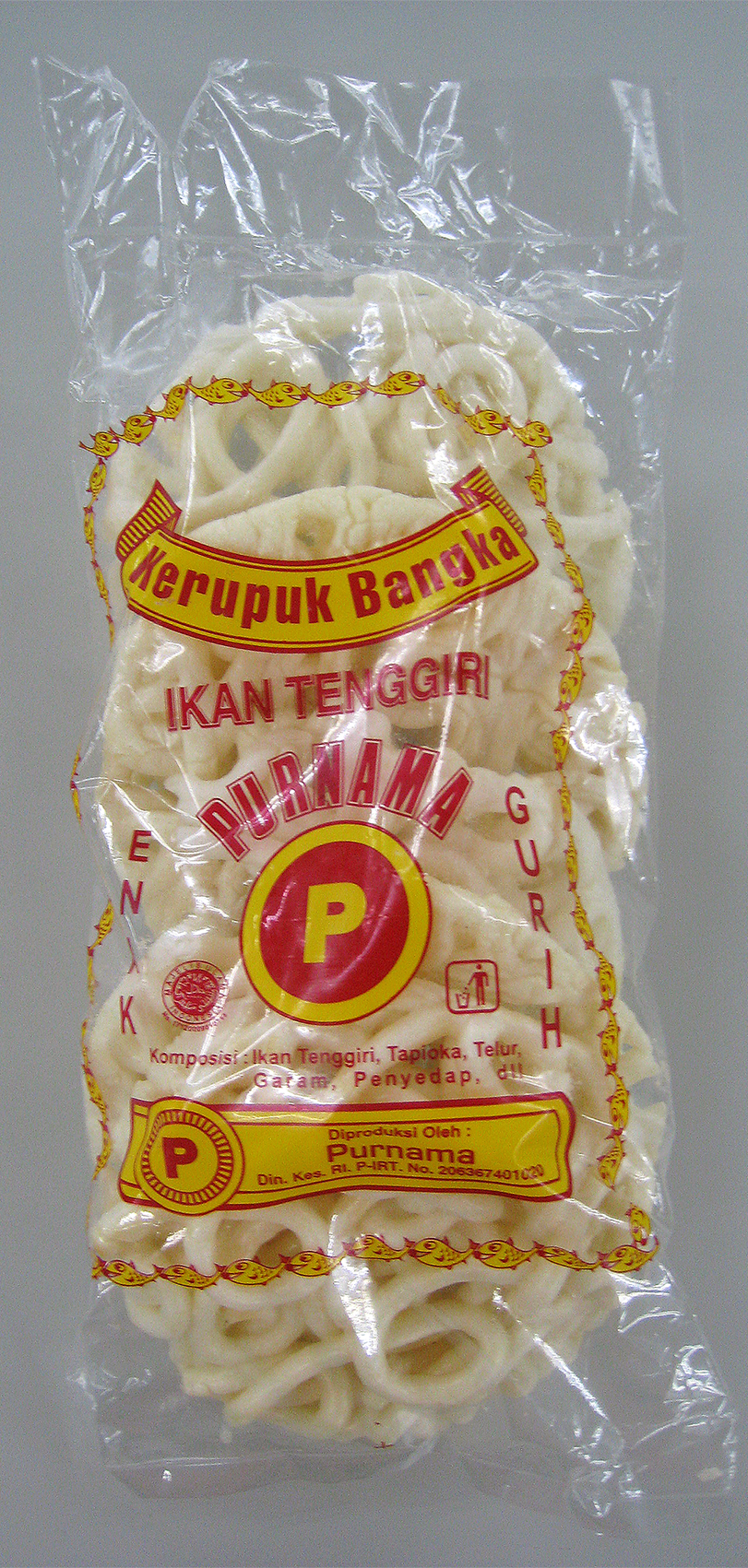
Krupuk Bangka

=== Indonesia ===
Like krupuk udang (prawn cracker), krupuk ikan (fish cracker) is a popular type of krupuk in Indonesia. Tenggiri (wahoo) and cakalang (skipjack tuna) are probably popular fish used for fish crackers. Nevertheless, other edible fish, such as bawal (pomfret) and ekor kuning (Caesionidae), might also be used.

Many coastal fishing towns and cities in Indonesia have developed their recipes and types. Cirebon in West Java and Palembang in South Sumatra are famous for their unique fish crackers that use tengiri. The flat kemplang style of fish cracker is associated with the Southern Sumatra region, from Lampung, Palembang, to Bangka island, while the cylindrical amplang style is associated with coastal Borneo, from Samarinda, Balikpapan, Banjarmasin, to Pontianak. In Palembang, fish crackers are usually eaten with pempek fish cake with kuah cuko (a sweet, spicy, and sour vinegar-based sauce).

Coastal fishing towns are traditionally known as the production centers for fish crackers. In Indonesia, fish crackers are produced in Bangka and on Belitung island, Cirebon in West Java, Juwana in Central Java, and Sidoarjo in East Java. Major coastal cities such as Palembang, Bandar Lampung, Medan, Makassar, Pontianak, and Samarinda are also major production centers.

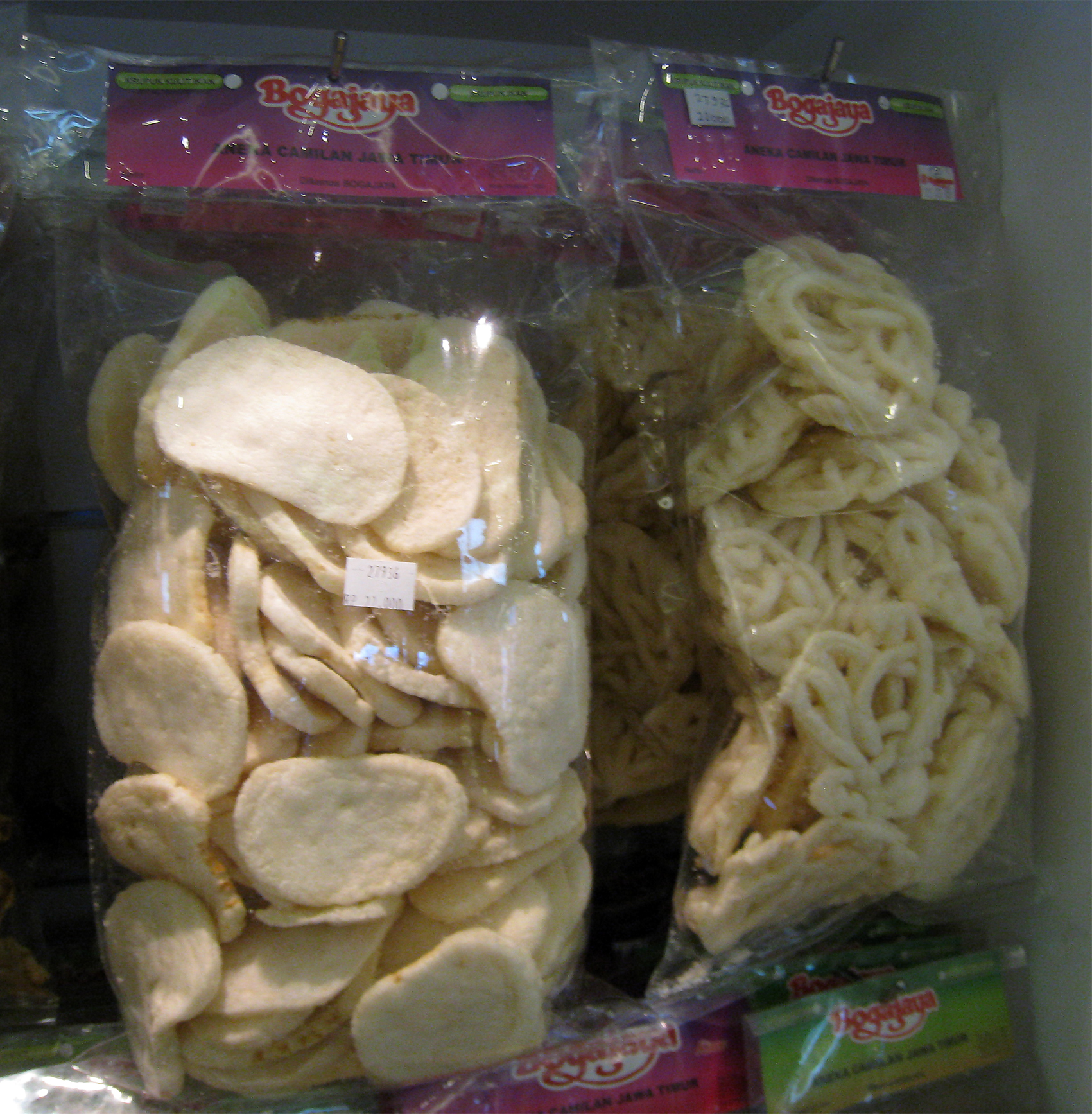
Two types of krupuk ikan (fish cracker), flat and curly

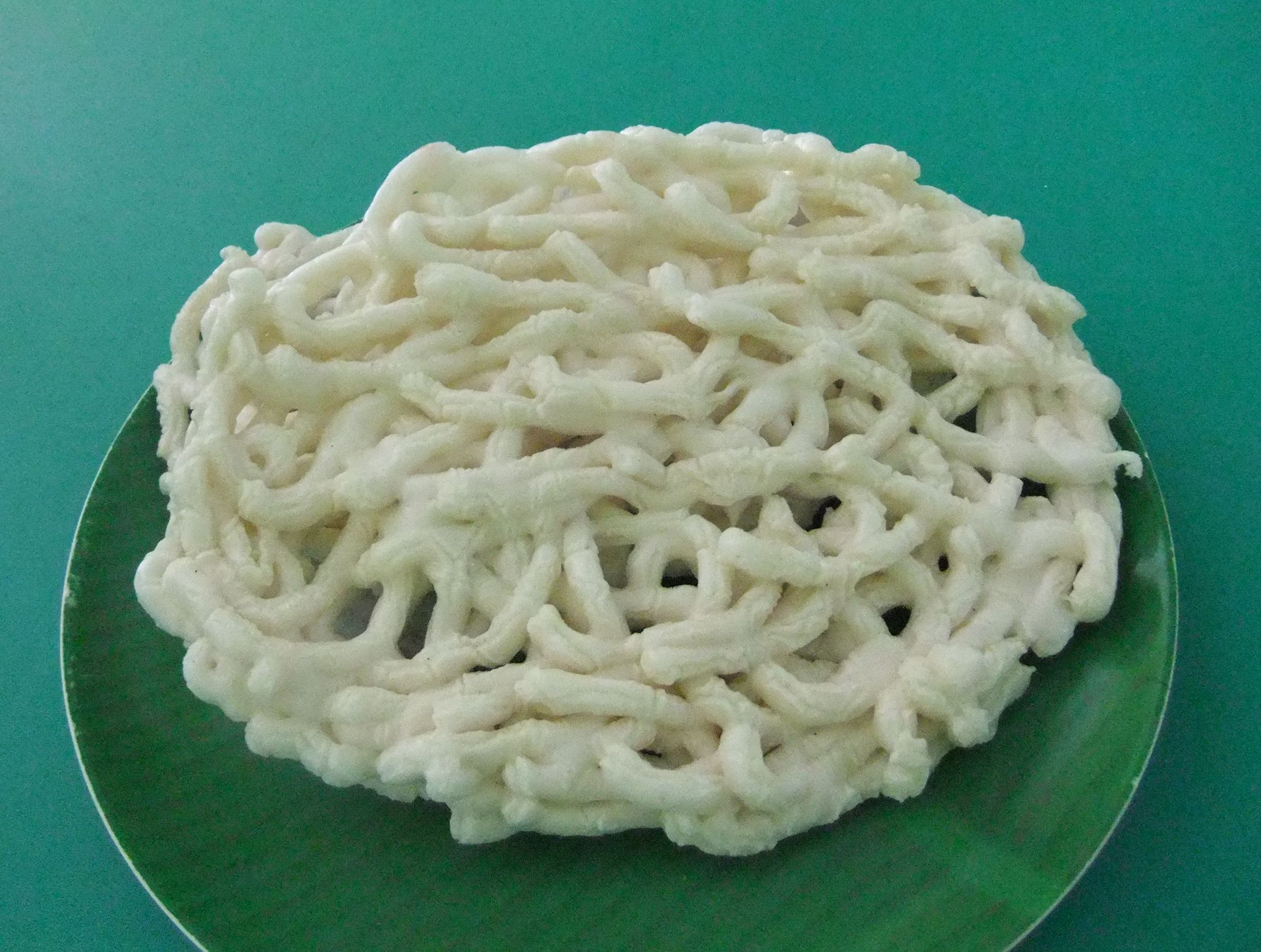
Krupuk ikan from Palembang

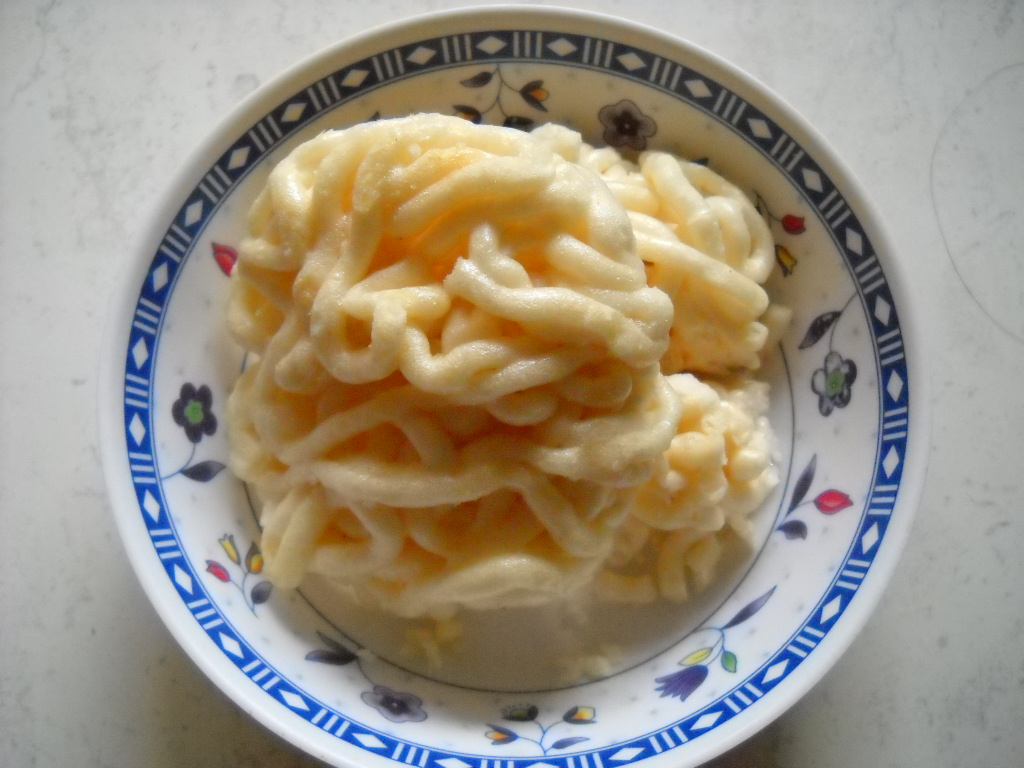
Bangka fish cracker

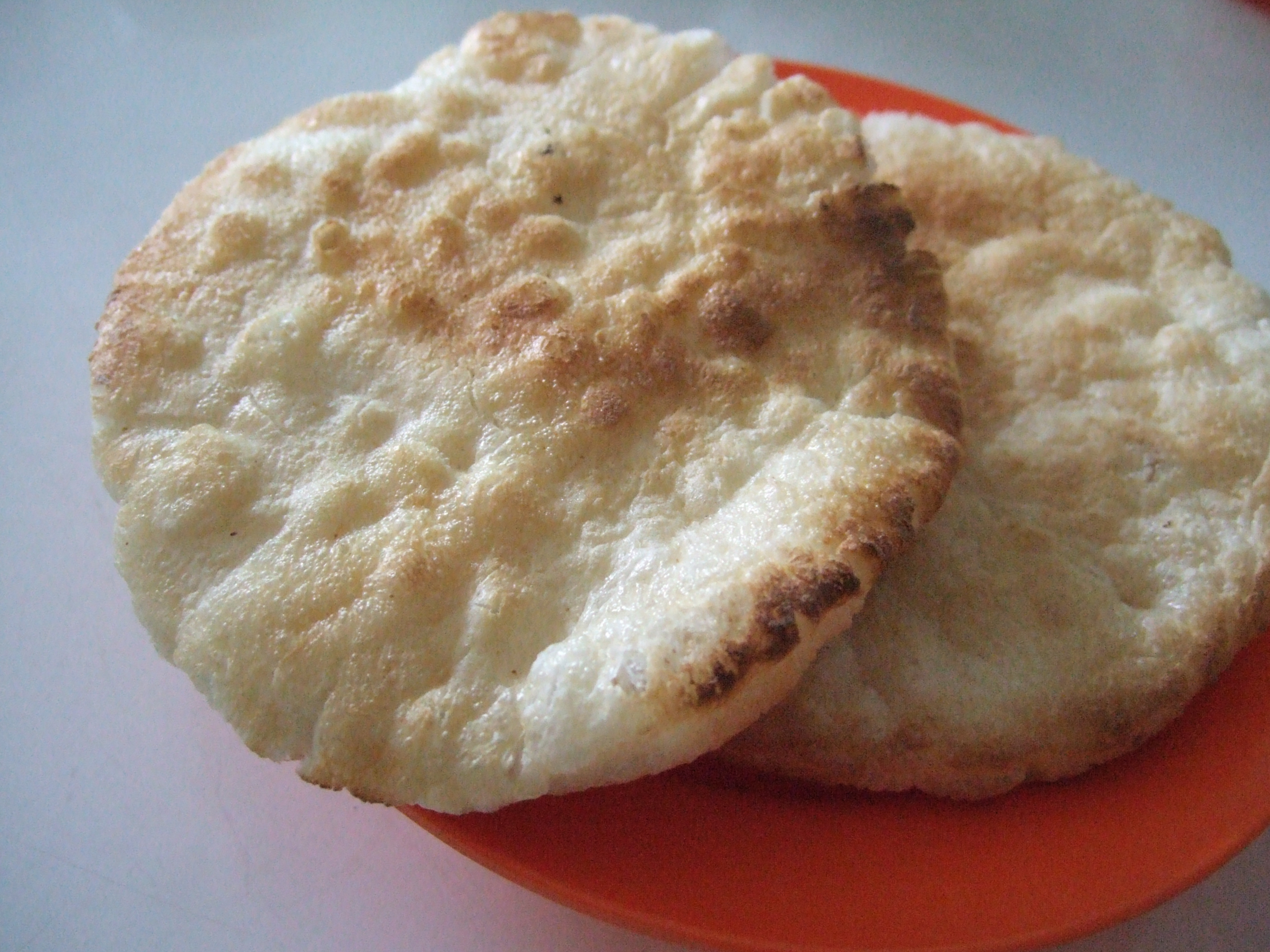
Krupuk kemplang from Bandar Lampung

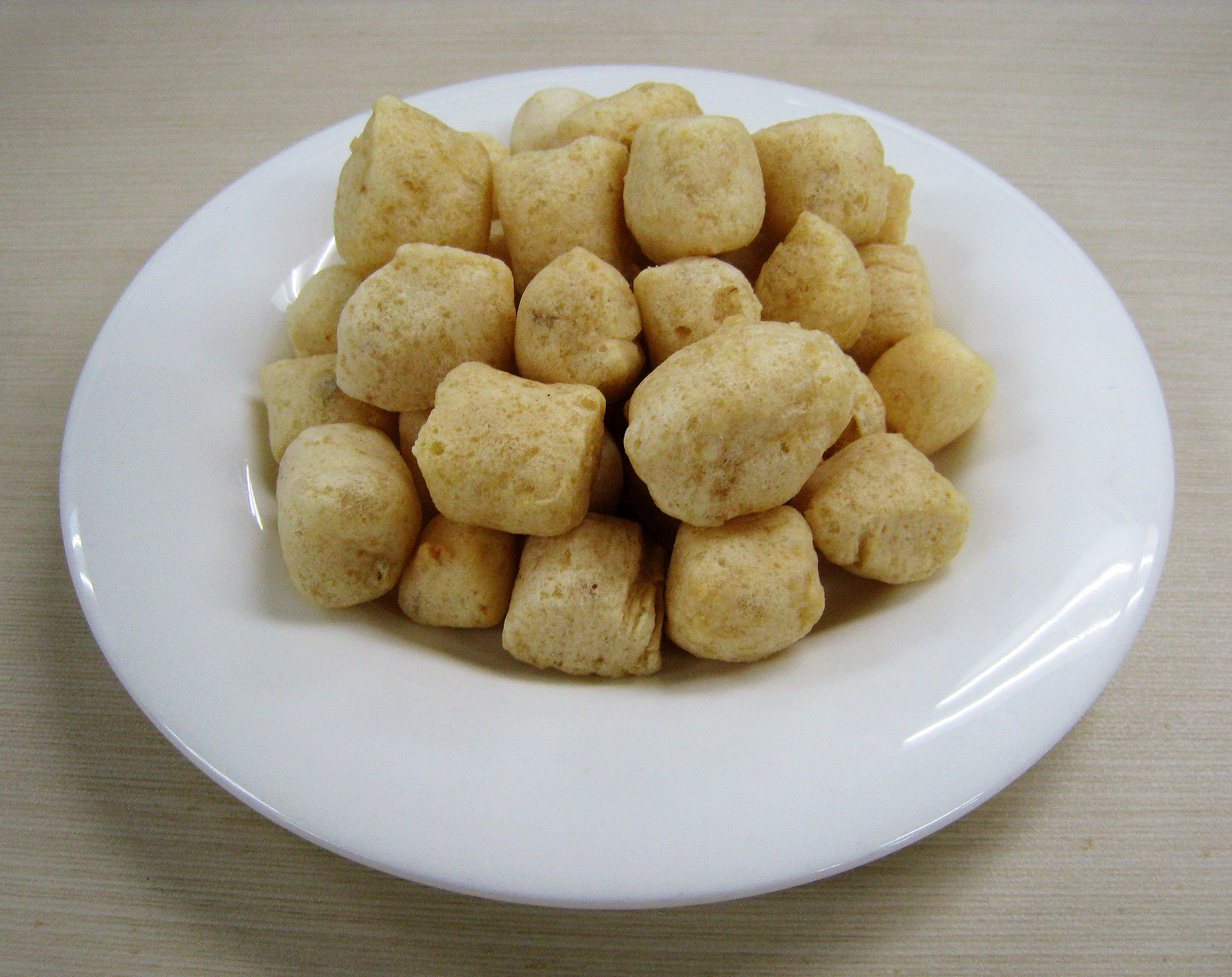
Krupuk amplang or kuku macan from Balikpapan

=== Malaysia ===
Fish cracker is a favourite snack in Malaysia and its neighbouring countries. Many fish cracker producers operate in the coastal areas of Malaysia, such as Kelantan, Terengganu, Pahang, Johor, Kedah, Sabah, and Sarawak. The types of fish normally used to process these fish crackers include the wolf herring (ikan parang), sardines (ikan tamban), round scad (ikan selayang), threadfin bream (ikan kerisi), ox-eyed scad (ikan lolong bara), goatfish (ikan biji nangka), lizard fish (ikan conor), and many others.

Historically, Mukah, a fishing town in Sarawak, is known for producing fish crackers.

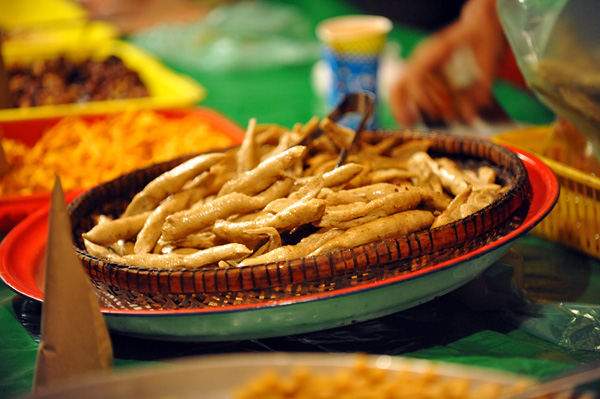
keropok lekor

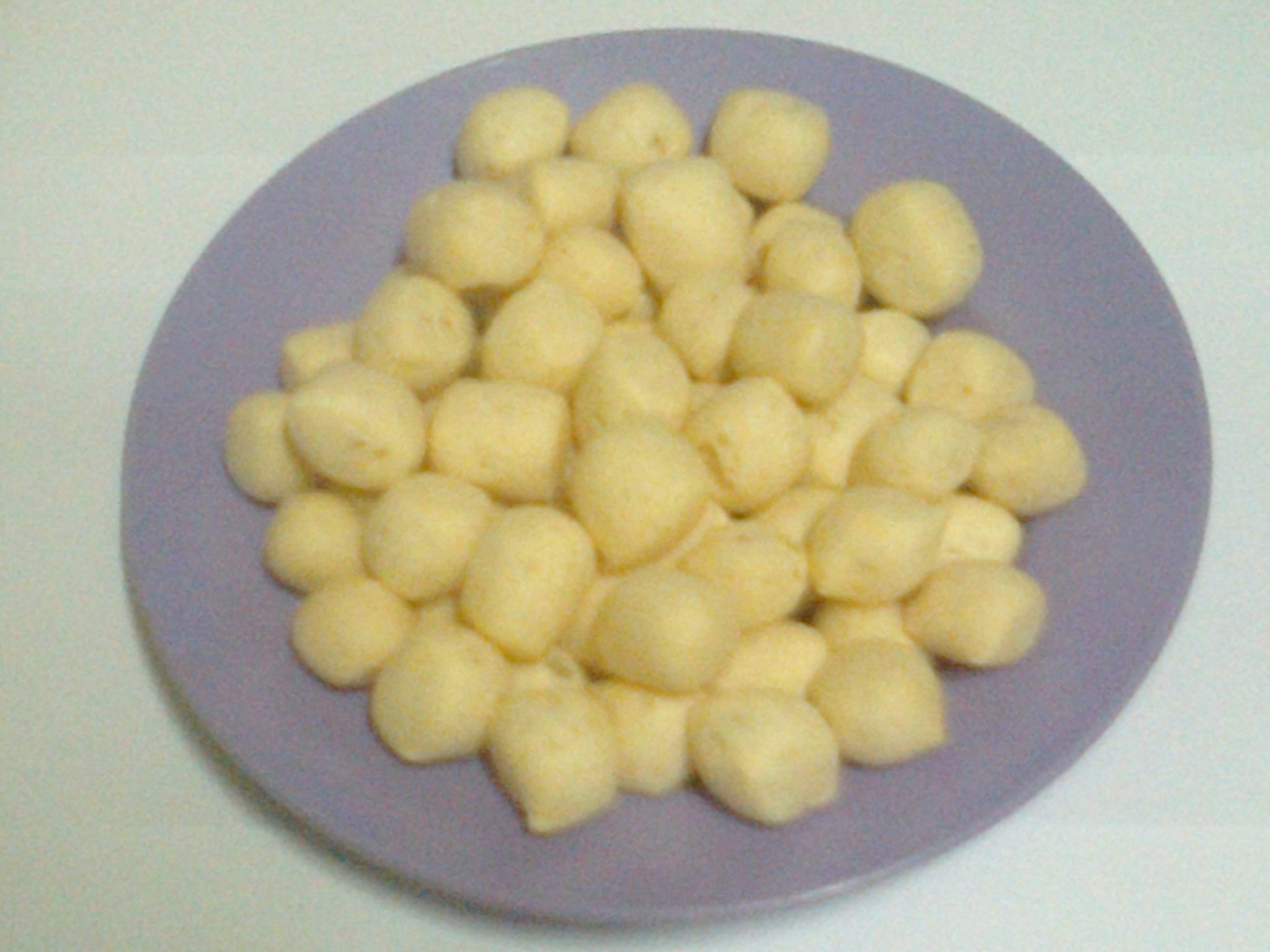
keropok amplang

== See also ==
- Krupuk
- Emping
