= Lekor =

Malay traditional snack from Terengganu, Malaysia

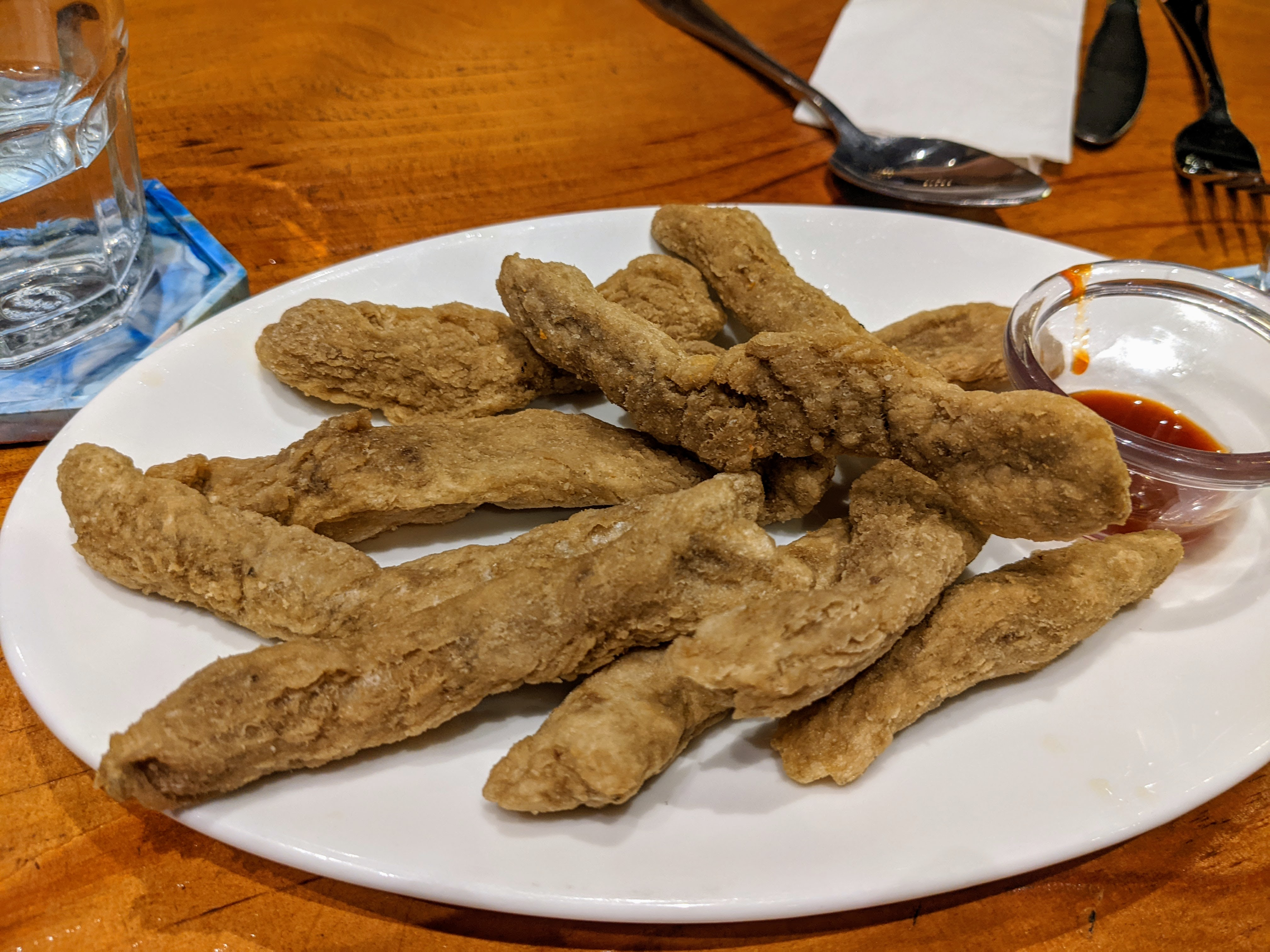
- Deep-fried keropok lekor served with a dipping sauce
- Alternative names: keropok lekor, Malaysian fish sausage
- Type: Snack (keropok)
- Place of origin: Malaysia
- Region or state: Terengganu
- Created by: Malay
- Serving temperature: Hot
- Main ingredients: Fish (Either ikan tamban (Silver-stripe round herring), sardine (Sardinella aurita) or selayang (Rastrelliger kanagurta)), sago flour or tapioca starch
- Ingredients generally used: Salt, sugar, and monosodium glutamate (MSG)
- Food energy (per serving): 87 kcal (360 kJ)

Lekor or fully known as keropok lekor (Malay pronunciation: [kəropoʔ lekor]; Jawi: كروڤوق ليكور) is a traditional Malay fish cracker or fish sausage snack originating from the state of Terengganu, Malaysia. It is made from fish and sago flour and seasoned with salt and sugar. It is slightly greyish and gives off a fishy taste and smell which becomes more prominent as it cools down after frying.

== Origin and background ==
The fish cracker has its origin in the area of the east coast of West Malaysia, specifically Terengganu, where it was created by Malay fishermen as a way to preserve fish during the monsoon season. The word lekor means "circumference" in the Terengganu Malay dialect, which replaces the spelling "ar" with "or" at the end of the syllable. Therefore, the meaning of keropok lekor is a "circular cracker" or "to roll". Within the states of Terengganu as well as Kelantan, the snack has been a profound symbol of local Malay cultural identity.

== Preparation ==
It is usually made by grinding fish from the species of ikan tamban (silver-stripe round herring), sardine (Sardinella aurita) or selayang (Rastrelliger kanagurta) or vegetables into a paste, mixing it with either sago or tapioca starch, salt, sugar as well as monosodium glutamate (MSG) and then deep-frying it. It comes in three main forms: lekor goreng (long and chewy), lekor rebus (steamed), and lekor keping (thin and crispy), divided into either fried or steamed. The former are sausage-shaped and fried, with a chewy texture, whereas the latter is boiled. Keropok lekor should not be confused with keropok keping. The snack is eaten with special homemade chilli blends that are particular to Terengganu and sold there; though modern innovations like adding mayonnaise and cheese sauce (the combination known locally as "keropok cheese") may also be available.

== Gallery ==
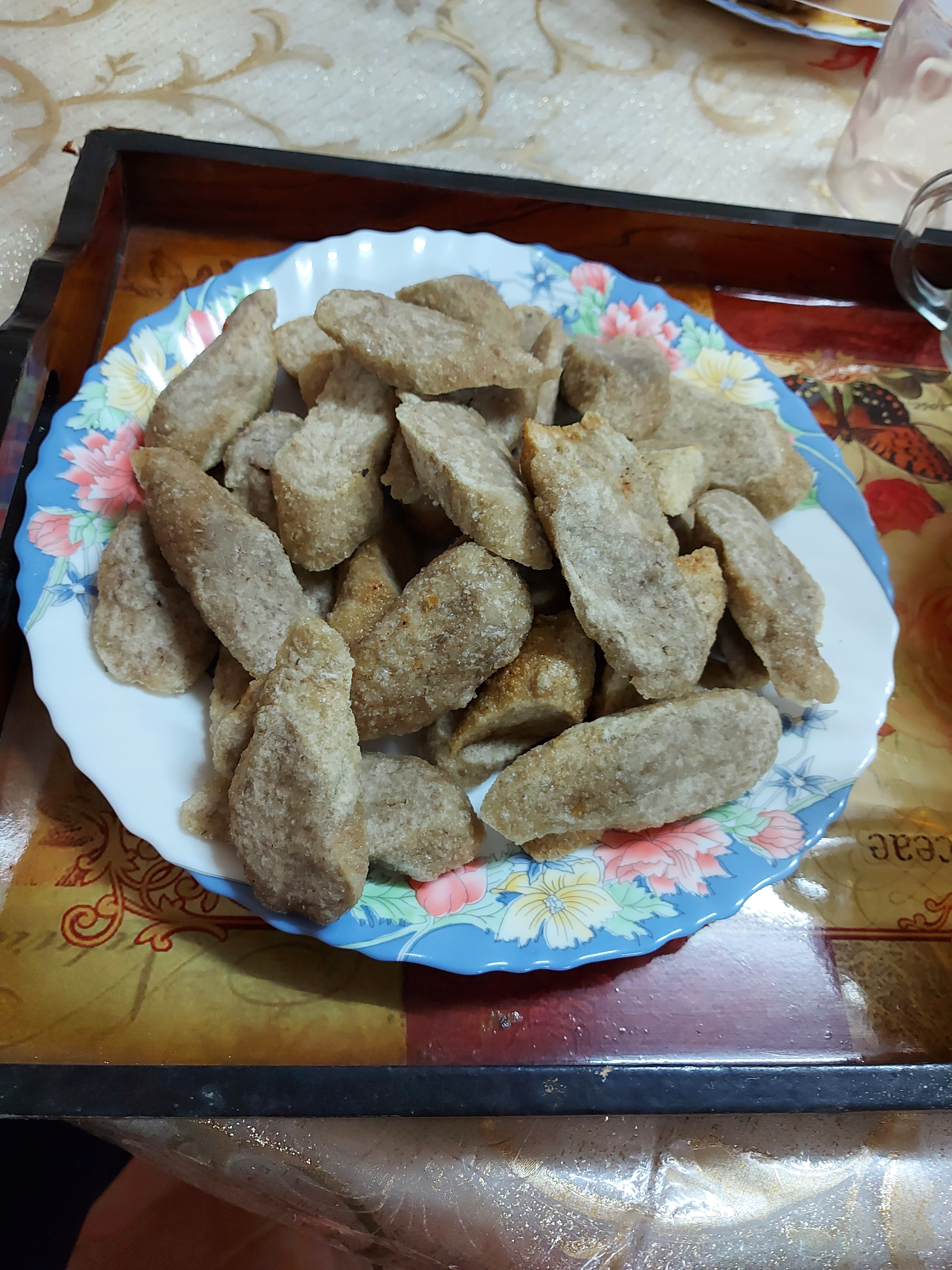
Lekor cut into pieces.

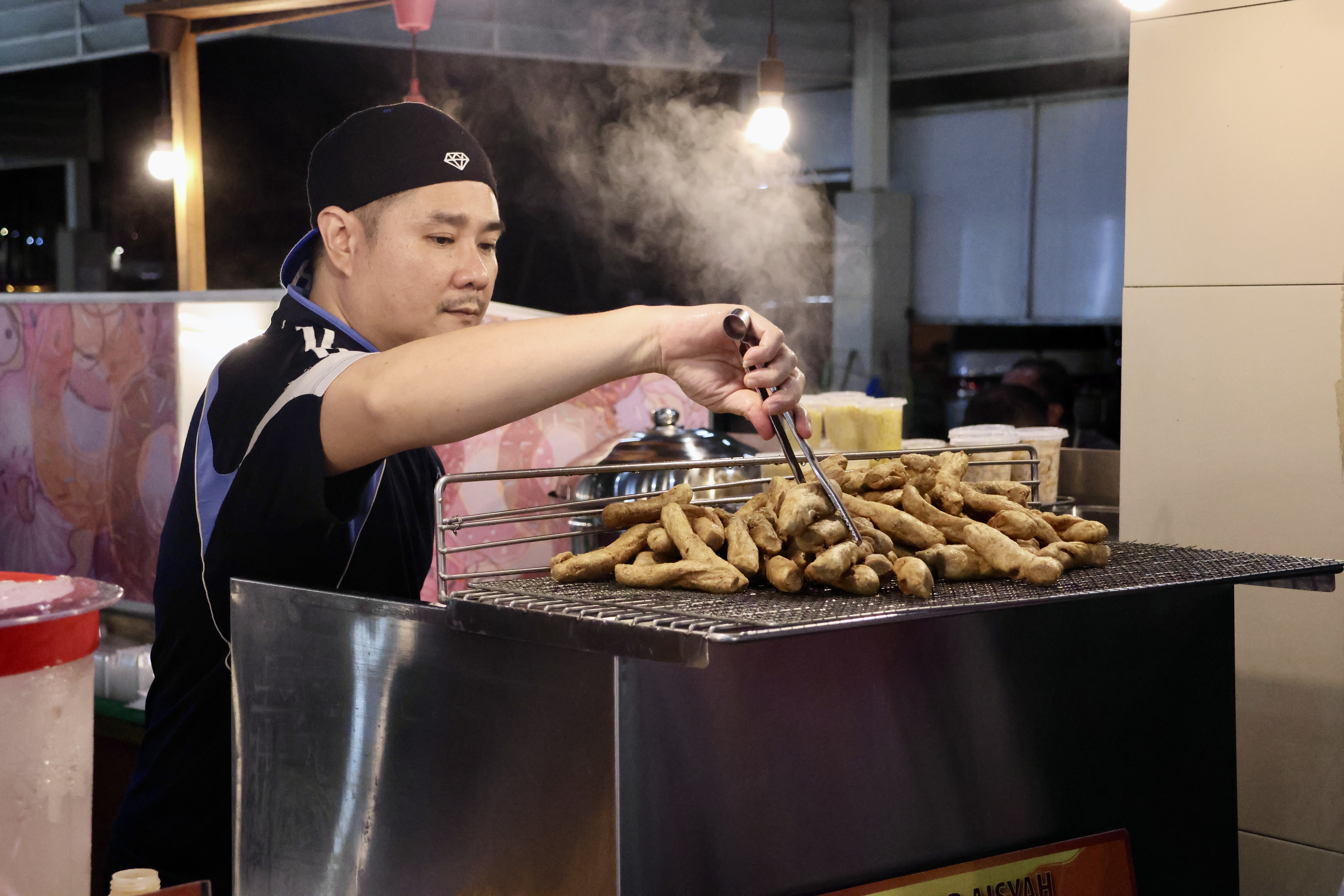
A freshly made lekor in Gadong, Brunei.

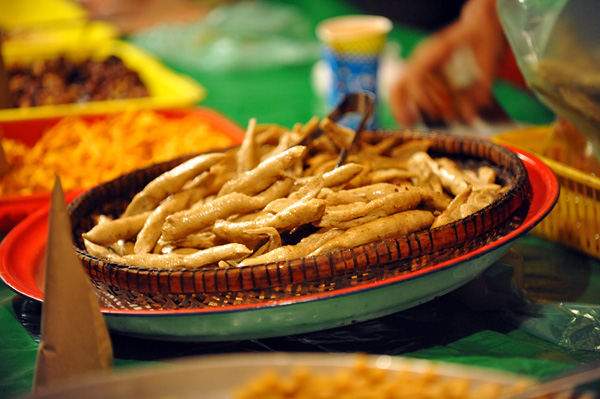
Freshly fried lekor being sold at a gerai (Malay traditional stalls).

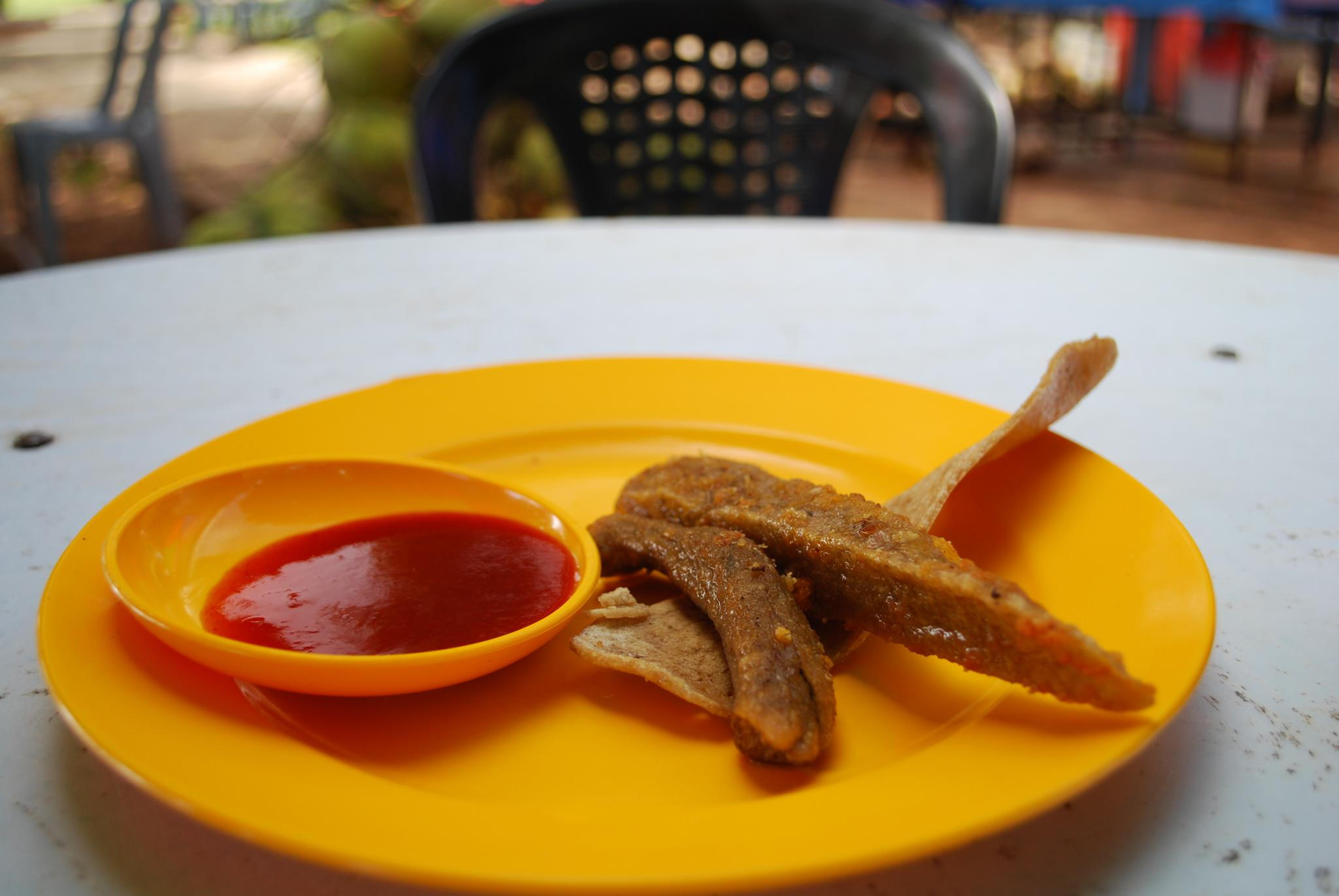
A plate of lekor with a dipping sauce.

== See also ==
- Ngo hiang
- Otak-otak
- Pempek
