= Amplang =

Indonesian fish cracker snack

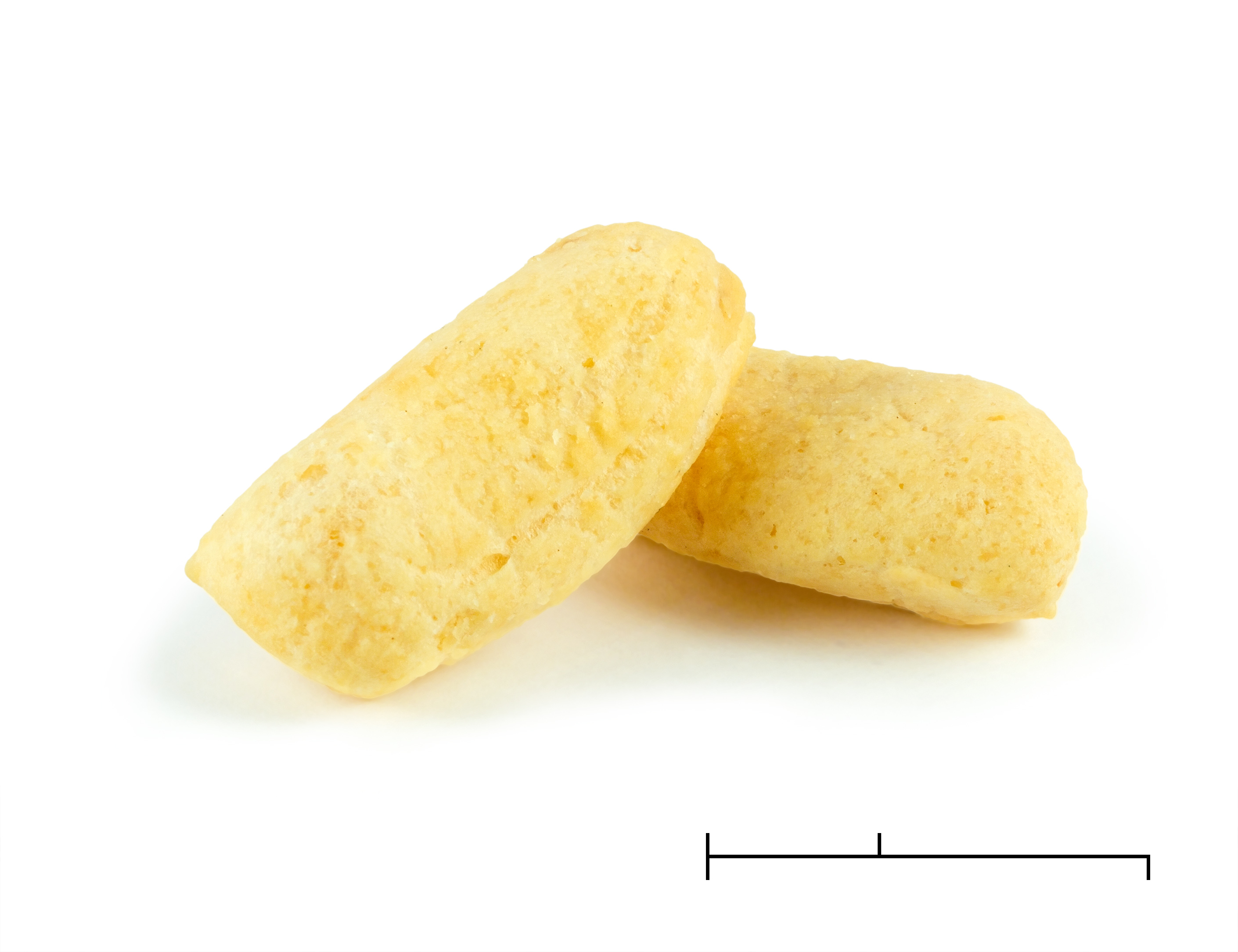
- Two amplang from Kotabaru; scale bar shows 1 cm / 1″
- Type: Snack
- Place of origin: Indonesia
- Region or state: Samarinda and Balikpapan in East Kalimantan
- Associated cuisine: Indonesia and Malaysian (especially in Sabah)
- Main ingredients: Wahoo or Spanish mackerel, tapioca flour, selected spices

Amplang, also known as kerupuk kuku macan, is a traditional savoury fish cracker snack commonly found in Indonesia and Malaysia. Amplang crackers are commonly made of ikan tenggiri (wahoo) or any type of Spanish mackerel, mixed with starch and other materials before being deep-fried.

The shape and size of amplang might vary, from traditional elongated "tiger nails" to dice or ping-pong balls. The colour may range from yellow to light brown.

== History ==
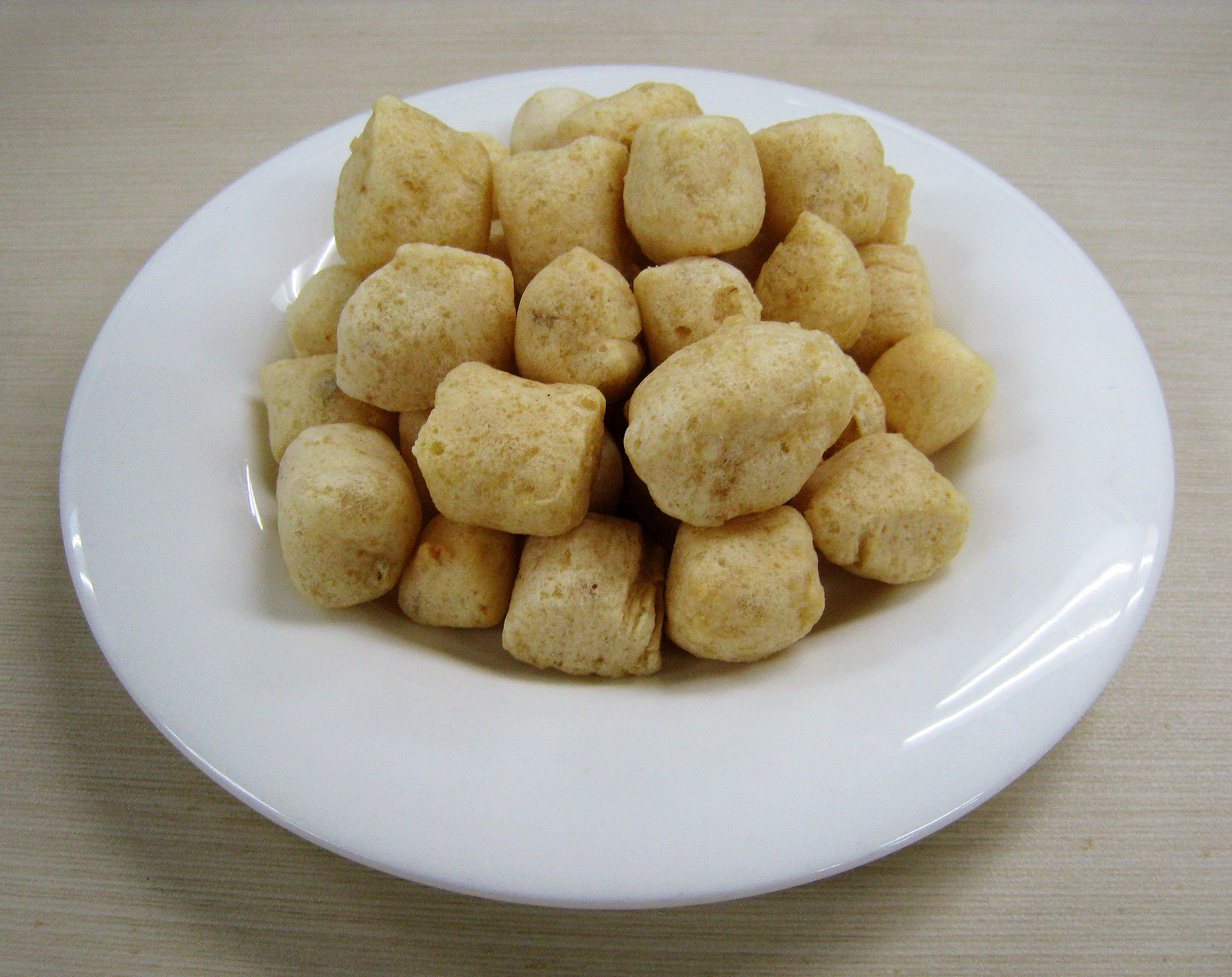
Amplang on a plate

In Indonesia, amplang is traditionally associated with Samarinda, the capital city of East Kalimantan, since the amplang cracker home industry has thrived in the city since the 1970s. Traditionally, amplang was made from ikan pipih or ikan belida (Chitala lopis). However, since this freshwater fish had become scarce, amplang makers replaced them with ikan tenggiri (wahoo) or gabus (striped snakehead). From Samarinda, the popularity of this savoury fish cracker spread to other cities in the Borneo island, such as Balikpapan, Banjarmasin, Pontianak, and even to Sabah in Malaysia.

Amplang is often sought as oleh-oleh (foodstuff gift or souvenir) by those who visited East Kalimantan. Today, amplang made by home industries in Kalimantan has been widely distributed, available in marketplaces and supermarkets in Indonesian cities, such as Jakarta, Bandung, Surabaya, and Medan.

== Production centres ==
Amplang is commonly produced by home industries in Samarinda, East Kalimantan in Indonesia. Other than Samarinda, amplang production centres also can be found in Balikpapan, Pontianak in West Kalimantan and Banjarmasin in South Kalimantan.

In neighbouring Malaysia, amplang is mainly produced on the east coast of Sabah, particularly in the town of Tawau.

== Variants ==
Today, the makers of amplang in East Kalimantan produce the snack not only with a fish flavor, but in a variety of flavors such as crab and seaweed. Nevertheless, the original amplang kuku macan remains the most popular.

== See also ==
- Kemplang
- Krupuk udang
