= Ngo hiang =

Hokkien and Teochew dish widely adapted in Malay and Indonesia

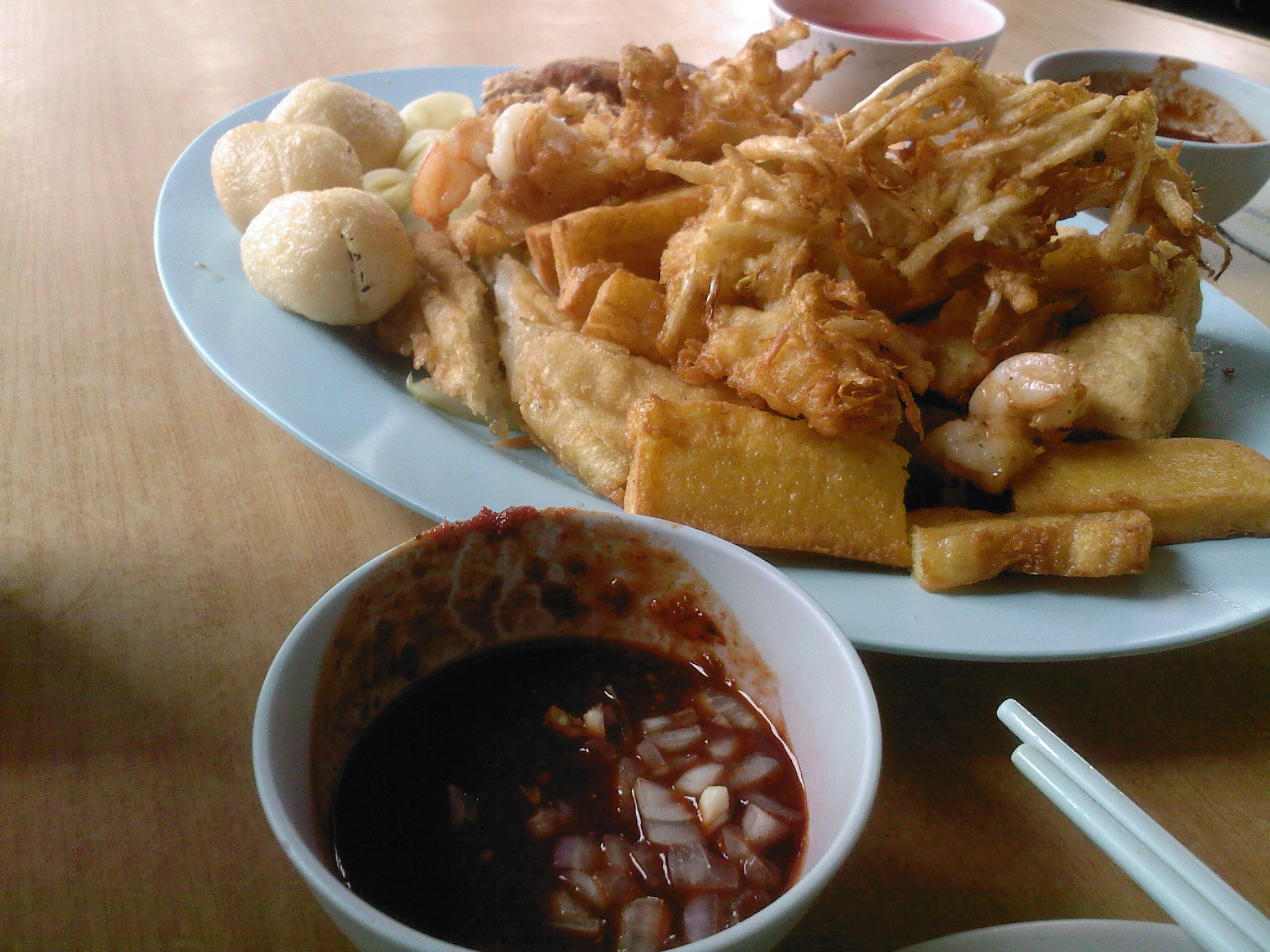
- Alternative names: Heh gerng (China); lor bak (Indonesia, Malaysia, Singapore); que-kiam, kikiam, kikyam, kekiam, ngohiong (Philippines)
- Place of origin: China
- Region or state: Minnan region, Hokkien-speaking areas of Indonesia, Malaysia, Philippines, Singapore, Thailand
- Main ingredients: Various meats and vegetables, five-spice powder, tofu skin

Ngo hiang
- Traditional Chinese: 五香
- Simplified Chinese: 五香
- Tâi-lô: ngóo-hiang / ngóo-hiong / góo-hiong
- Literal meaning: five spices
Transcriptions
Standard Mandarin
- Hanyu Pinyin: Wǔxiāng
- Wade–Giles: Wu^{3}-hsiang^{1}
Yue: Cantonese
- Yale Romanization: Ńghhēung
- Jyutping: Ng^{5}hoeng^{1}
Southern Min
- Tâi-lô: ngóo-hiang / ngóo-hiong / góo-hiong

Ngo hiang (Hokkien Chinese: 五香; Tâi-lô: ngóo-hiang / ngóo-hiong / góo-hiong), also known as heh gerng (Chinese: 蝦管; Tâi-lô: hê-kǹg) lor bak (Chinese: 五香滷肉; Tâi-lô: ngóo-hiong-lóo-bah) or kikiam (Tagalog pronunciation: [ˈkɪk.jam]) is a Hokkien and Teochew dish widely adopted in Indonesia, Malaysia, the Philippines, Singapore, and Thailand, in addition to its place of origin in southern China.

It is essentially a composition of various meats and vegetables and other ingredients, such as a sausage-like roll consisting of minced pork and prawn (or fish) seasoned with five-spice powder (Hokkien: Chinese: 五香粉, ngóo-hiong-hún) after which it is named, rolled inside a tofu skin and deep-fried. It is usually served with chili sauce and a house-special sweet sauce. Many stalls in Singaporean food courts and hawker centres sell fried bihun with ngo hiang; this combination is common for breakfast and lunch. In Indonesia, people enjoy ngo hiang with sambal.

The Philippine versions were originally introduced by Hokkien migrants and are generally known as kikiam. However, the variant called ngohiong from Cebu has diverged significantly from the original dish. Instead of using beancurd skin, it uses lumpia wrappers. A street food dish also sometimes called "kikiam" (called "tempura" in Cebu) in the Philippines is neither of those dishes, but is instead an elongated version of fishballs. The street food version of kikiam was made from pork, not fish.

== 2019 Southeast Asian Games controversies ==
During the 2019 Southeast Asian Games in the Philippines, a report from the South China Morning Post on 26 November 2019 claimed that Muslim athletes from Singapore were served kikiam and pork rolls, both containing ground pork which Muslims are prohibited from consuming. The report, however, was refuted by the Singapore National Olympic Council, stating that the Muslim athletes on the Singaporean team were not served pork to eat.

On the same day, another incident occurred after the coach of the Philippine women's football team complained that the athletes were only served kikiam with rice and egg for breakfast at the hotel that they stayed in. The hotel clarified, however, that the kikiam was actually chicken sausage, and was part of a buffet service that included other food as well. It was also revealed that the coach was not actually at the hotel when the incident happened. Following this, the coach apologized to the hotel for the error.

== Gallery ==
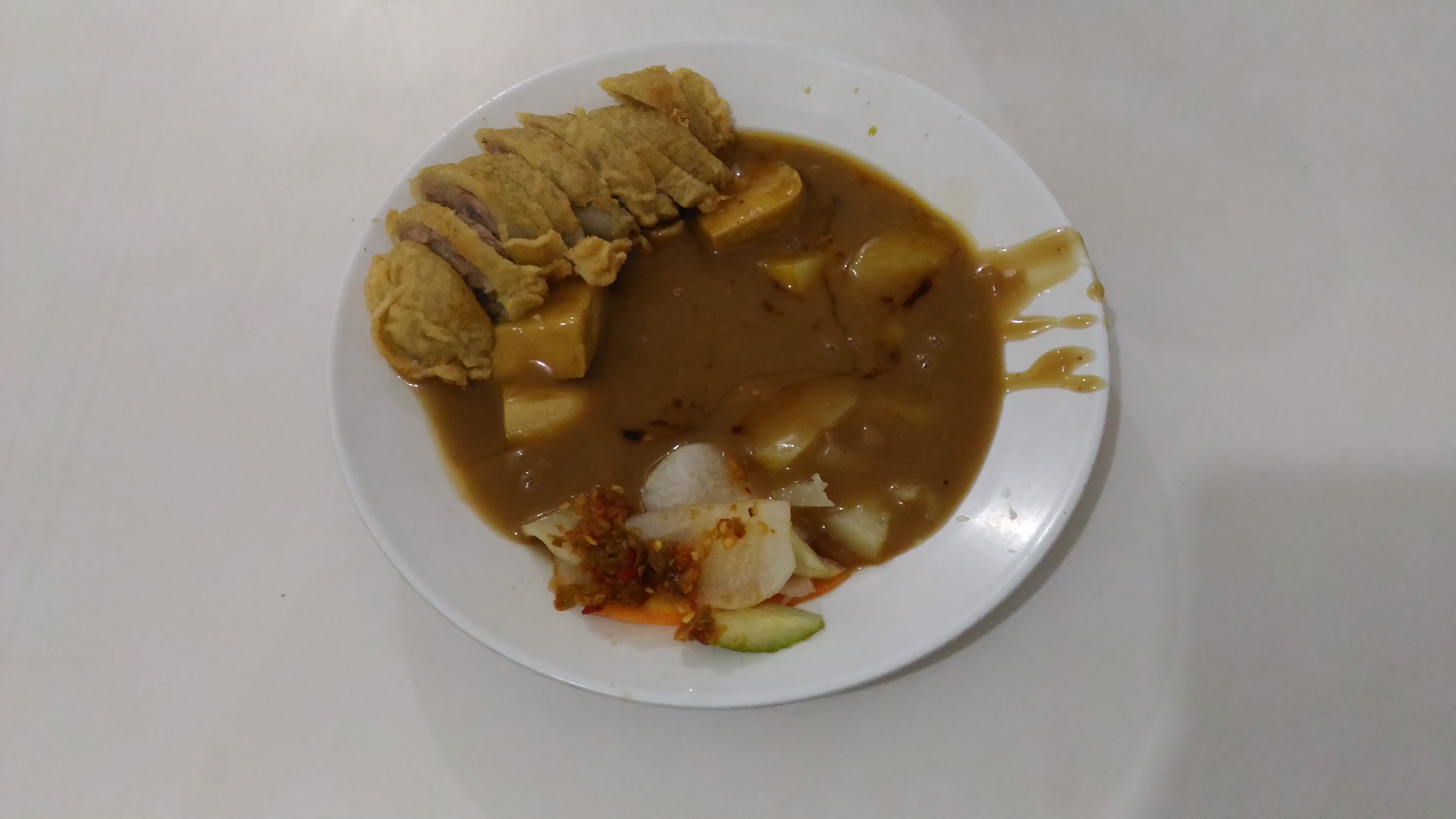
Ngo hiang in Bogor, Indonesia

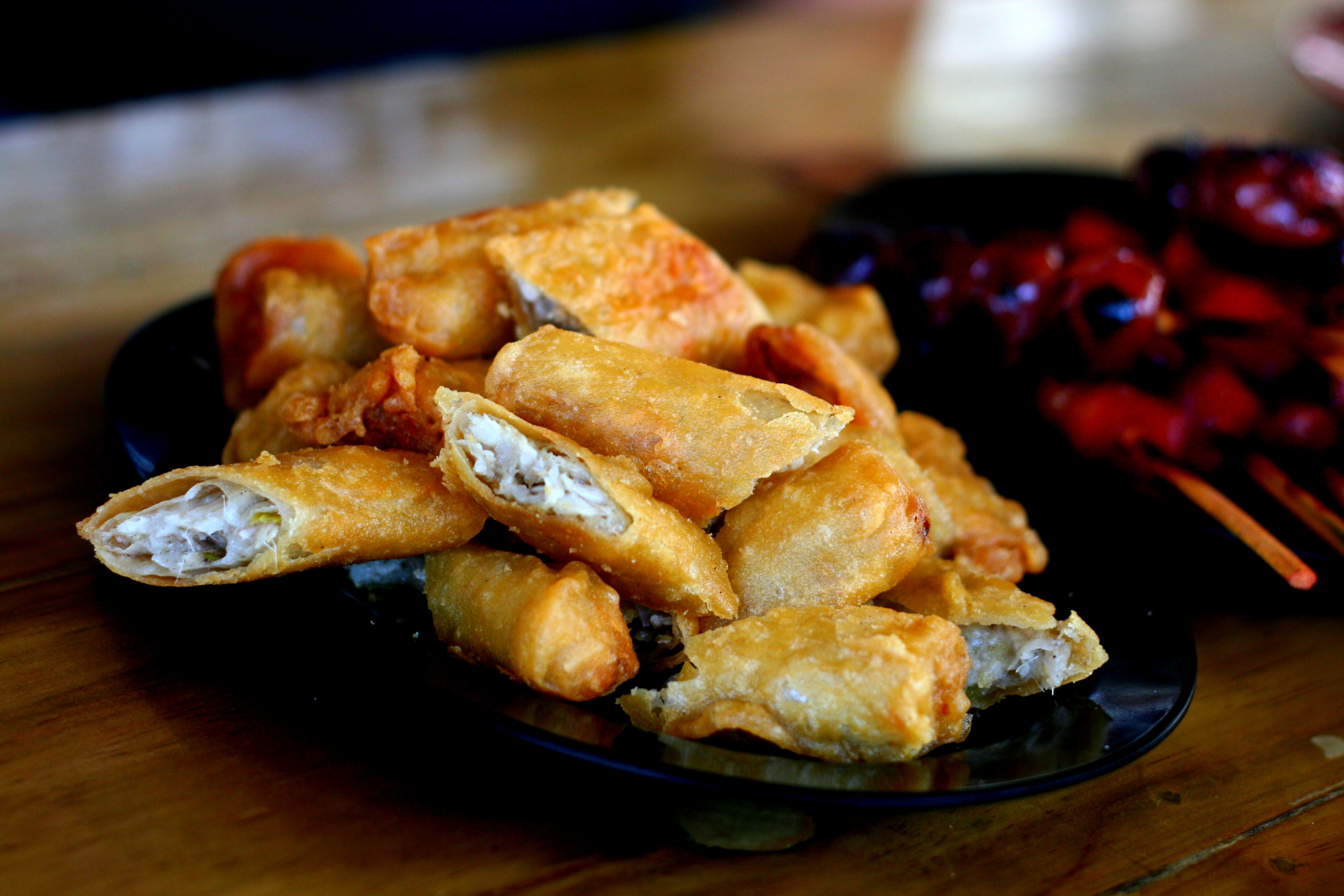
Filipino ngohiong is wrapped in lumpia wrappers rather than tofu skin

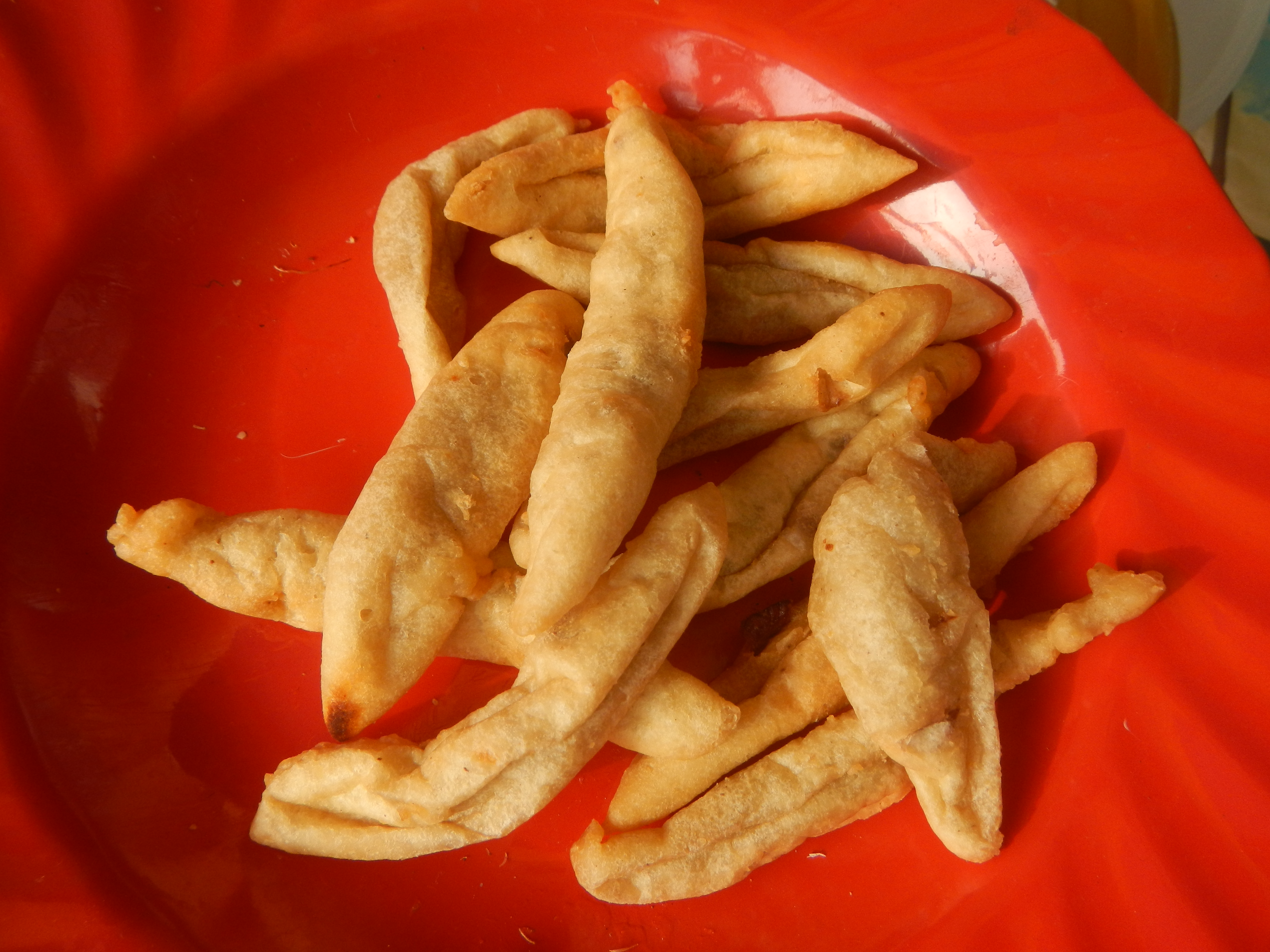
Street-food kikiam in Baliwag, Bulacan, Philippines

== See also ==
- Batagor
- Fishcake
- Lekor
- Otak-otak
- Pempek
