= Kemplang =

Indonesian fish cracker snack

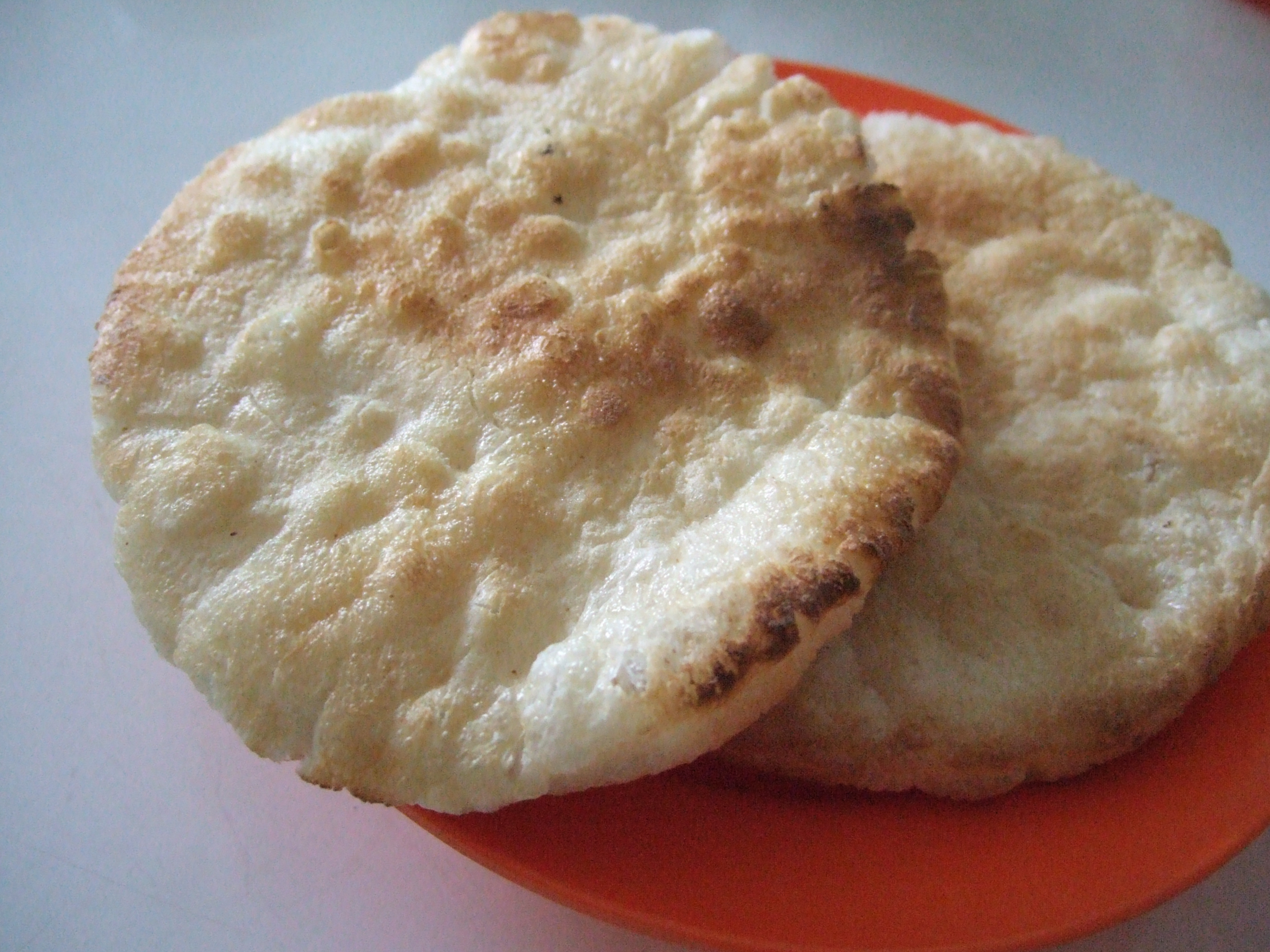
- Kemplang cracker from Bandar Lampung
- Type: Snack
- Place of origin: Indonesia
- Region or state: Palembang in South Sumatra, Lampung and Bangka Belitung
- Main ingredients: Wahoo or Spanish mackerel, tapioca flour

Kemplang is an Indonesian traditional savory fish cracker (krupuk ikan) snack commonly found in southern parts of Sumatra, Indonesia. Kemplang crackers are commonly made of ikan tenggiri (wahoo) or any type of Spanish mackerel, mixed with tapioca starch and other flavorings, sun-dried and then grilled or fried.

The shape of a kemplang is similar to Japanese senbei cracker. It is flat and round with whitish color, sometimes with dark burnt acquired from grilling process. Kemplang is usually consumed with a sour and spicy sambal chili paste.

== History ==
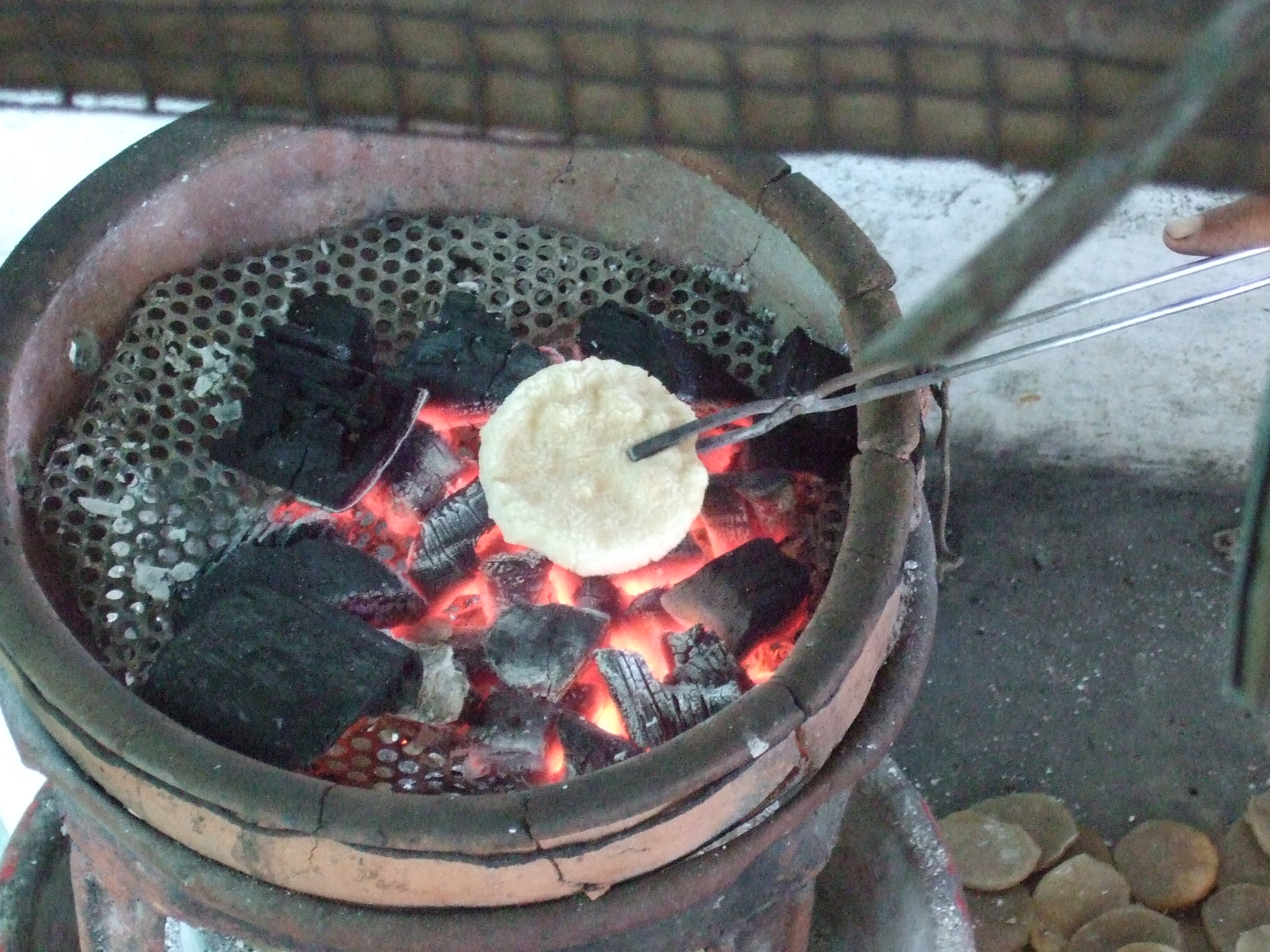
Kemplang being grilled on charcoal

The name kemplang derived from local Palembang language which means "to hit" to refer the process of flattening the krupuk dough. Kemplang was developed in coastal town in southern parts of Sumatra which traditionally includes South Sumatra, Bangka Belitung and Lampung provinces.

In Palembang, kemplang home industry is often linked to pempek industry, as both uses almost identical ingredients; wahoo fish and tapioca. Kemplang crackers are more likely to be fried in Palembang and Bangka, while in Lampung, kemplang crackers are commonly grilled on charcoal.

Kemplang is often sought as oleh-oleh (foodstuff gift or souvenir) by those who visited Palembang, Bandar Lampung, or Bangka. Today, kemplang made by home industries in southern Sumatra has been widely distributed, available in marketplaces and supermarkets in Indonesian cities, such as Jakarta, Bandung, Surabaya and Medan.

== Production centers ==
Kemplang commonly produced by home industries in Palembang, Bandar Lampung, and Bangka island. In Palembang, the demands of kemplang cracker usually increased during lebaran (Eid ul-Fitr) holiday.

== See also ==
- Amplang
- Pempek
- Krupuk
