= Pempek =

Indonesian dish made of fish and tapioca

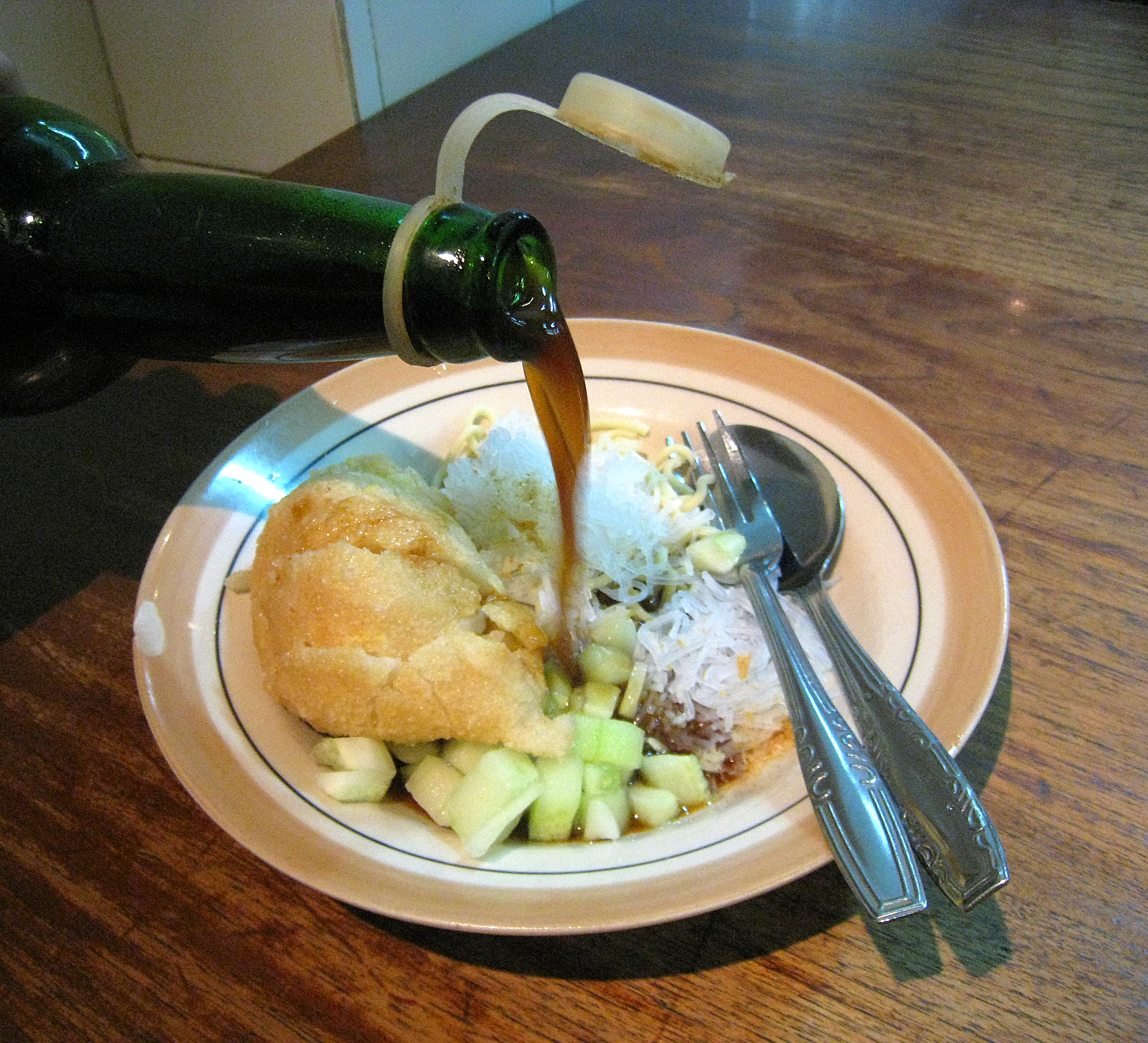
- Pempek kapal selam and keriting poured with kuah cuko, a sour, sweet and spicy sauce.
- Course: Main course or snack
- Place of origin: Indonesia
- Region or state: Palembang, South Sumatra
- Serving temperature: Hot
- Main ingredients: Fish, tapioca, egg, noodles, palm sugar, vinegar, tamarind, dried shrimp powder
- Variations: Lenggang, tekwan, model, rujak mie

Pempek, mpek-mpek, or, colloquially, empek-empek, is a savory Indonesian fishcake, made of fish and tapioca, from Palembang, South Sumatra, Indonesia. Pempek is served with a rich sweet and sour sauce called kuah cuka or kuah cuko (lit. 'vinegar sauce'), or just "cuko". Sometimes local people also eat the dish with yellow noodles and diced cucumber to balance out the vinegar's sourness, or adding chili powder to give the vinegar spiciness.

== Origin ==
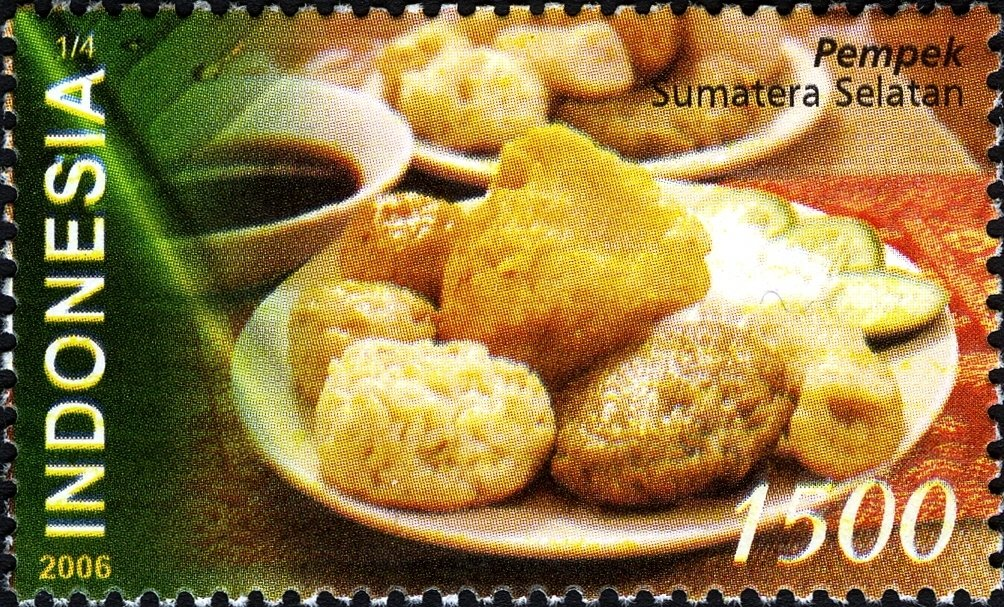
Pempek in Indonesian 2006 stamp described as South Sumatran dish

Pempek is the best-known of Palembang's dishes. Its origin is undoubtedly Palembang. However, the history behind the creation of this savoury dish is unclear. Traditional folklore connects it with Chinese influences. Some suggest that pempek probably originated from ancient kelesan, a steamed dish made of the mixture of sago dough with fish flesh, dated as early as Srivijayan era circa 7th century CE. Sago flour might be extracted from the trunk of sago palm or aren palm.

Before the introduction of tapioca in Asia in the 16th century A.D., pempek had been made with sago flour, in which the dish known as kelesan at that time.

According to local tradition, around the 16th century there was an old Chinese immigrant who lived near the Musi river. He noticed an abundance of fish caught by the local fishermen. In the Sumatran tropical climate, before the invention of refrigeration technology, most of these unsold leftover fish decayed and were wasted. The indigenous people, however, had limited knowledge and techniques for processing fish. During that period, most of the indigenous people simply grilled, fried or boiled their fish instead of adding other ingredients to make new dishes. The old Chinese man mixed in some tapioca and other spices, which he then sold around the village on his cart. The people referred to this old man as 'pek-apek, where apek is a Chinese slang word to call an old man. The food is known today as empek-empek or pempek.

Another theory suggests that pempek was a Palembang adaptation of Southern Chinese ngo hiang or kekkian (fishcake) as a surimi (魚漿, yújiāng)-based food. Instead of being served in soup or plainly fried, however, pempek is notable for its spicy palm sugar-and-vinegar-based sauce.

== Ingredients ==
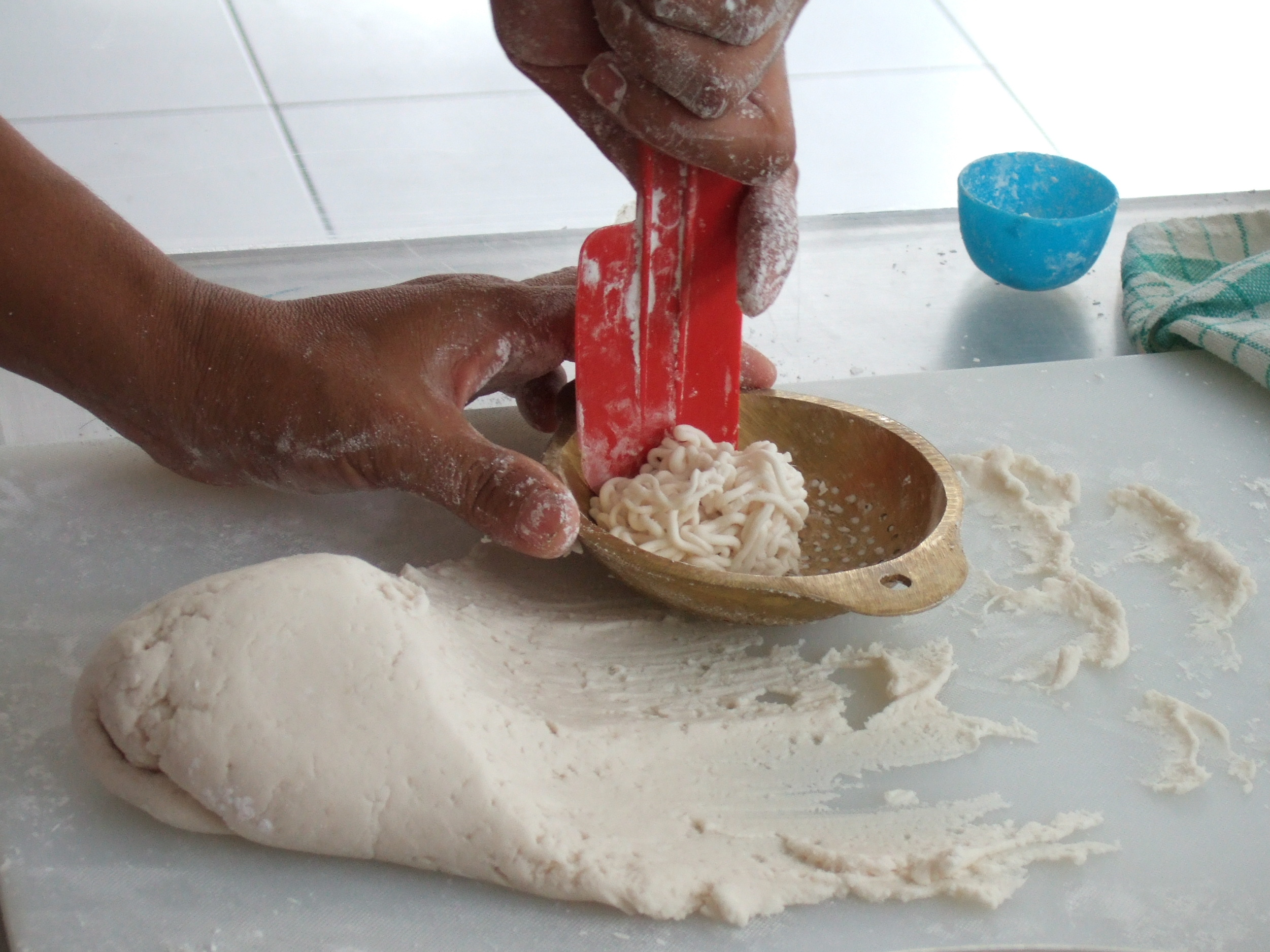
Pempek dough is the base of various shaped pempeks.

=== Dough ===
Pempek dough is made from a mixture of boneless ground fish meat, most commonly tenggiri (wahoo), with water, salt and sago flour. Sometimes, people also add a little bit of cooking oil or wheat flour to improve the texture and to make the pempek not too chewy; they also add MSG to enrich the umami taste. Ikan gabus (snakehead) is also commonly made into pempek. Numerous pempek sellers and producers in Palembang use a cheap combination of fish, which has a strong scent. According to tradition, the best-tasting pempek are made of belida or belido (Chitala lopis), but due to its rarity and superior taste, pempek made from this fish are usually more expensive.

Pempek in Bangka Island are made from mackerel (ikan kembung) and its sauce is red chilli-based, while in Jakarta or other cities they could be made from gourami fish. The latest variant is pempek udang, pempek made of minced shrimp, originating from the Sungsang area in Banyuasin near the Musi river estuary; it is noticeable with its pinkish color.

The dough is boiled in hot water or steamed until hardened into partly cooked dumplings, and stored to be fried later just before serving.

=== Sauce ===
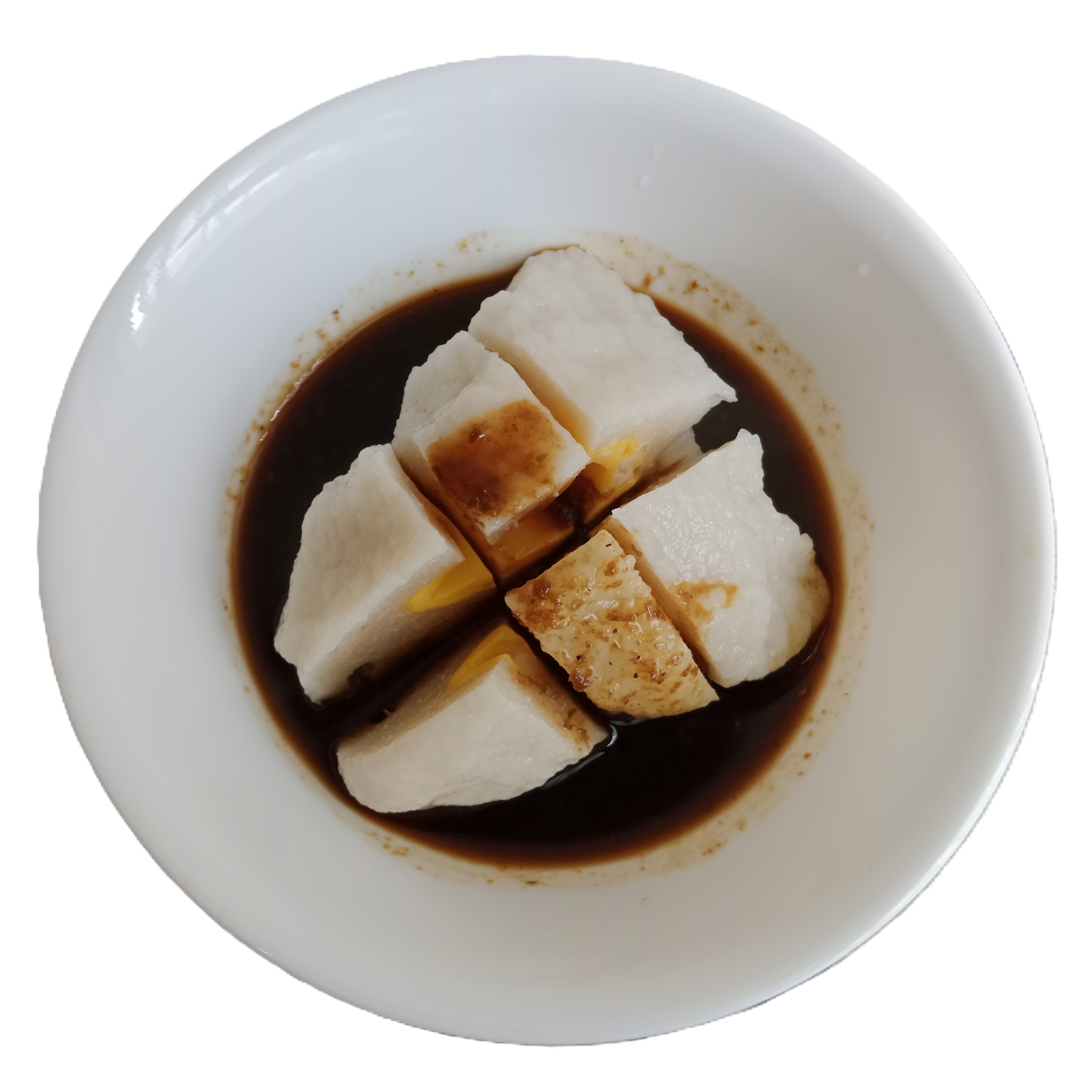
Pempek kapal selam soaked with kuah cuko, a dark-coloured sour, sweet and spicy sauce.

Kuah cuko (lit: vinegar sauce) is produced by adding palm sugar, chili pepper, garlic, vinegar, and salt to boiling water. The color of this sauce is dark brown. Sometimes tongcai and ebi (ground dried shrimp) are also added to increase the flavor. This sweet, sour and spicy sauce is essential for flavouring the pempek, since the pempek dough is very mildly savoury.

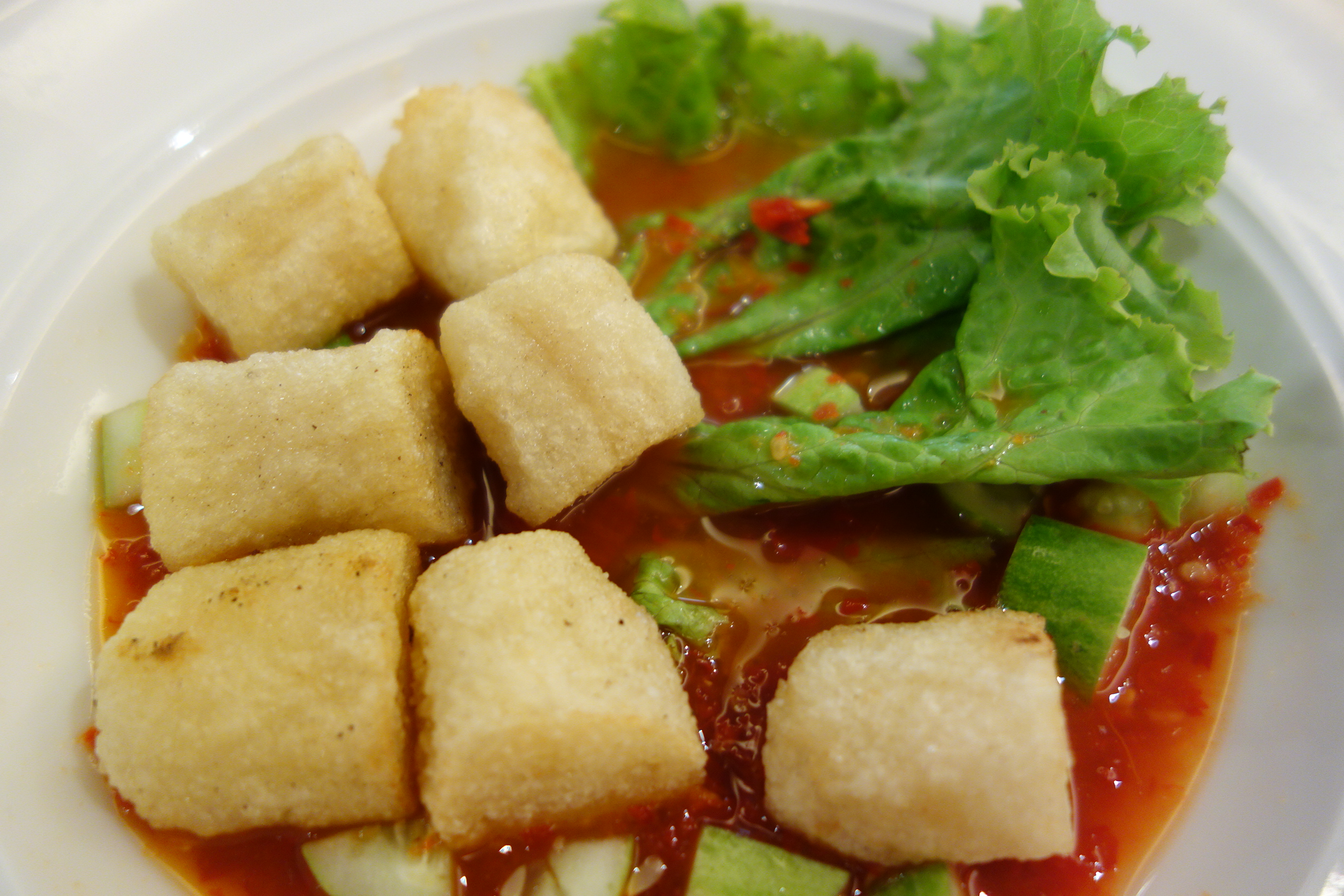
Pempek Bangka with reddish chili-based sauce

The sauce of Bangka pempek is chili-based, made from the mixture of ground red chili and vinegar; its color is bright red. Traditionally all pempek sauces are served hot and spicy, with the ground chilies mixed in the sauce. However, since some people desire unspicy sauce, or cannot eat hot and spicy sauce, the ground chillis were often separated as sambals. In some pempek restaurants, the bottled kuah cuko sauce is left on customers' tables and they are welcome to pour on the amount of sauce they desire. There are two kind of sauces available, spicy hot and plain.

Another pempek variant is pempek sambal, a specialty of Palembang's neighboring city Jambi. This type of pempek is not eaten with liquid sauce; instead, the flat rounded pempek is smeared, coated and sautéed with thick sambal chili sauce.

=== Serving ===
The boiled or steamed pempek dumplings are deep-fried in cooking oil until light pale brown right before serving. They are cut in bite-size, served with yellow noodles or rice vermicelli, showered in kuah cuko, and sprinkled with chopped cucumber and ebi powder. The additional fish krupuk crackers might be offered.

== Variants ==
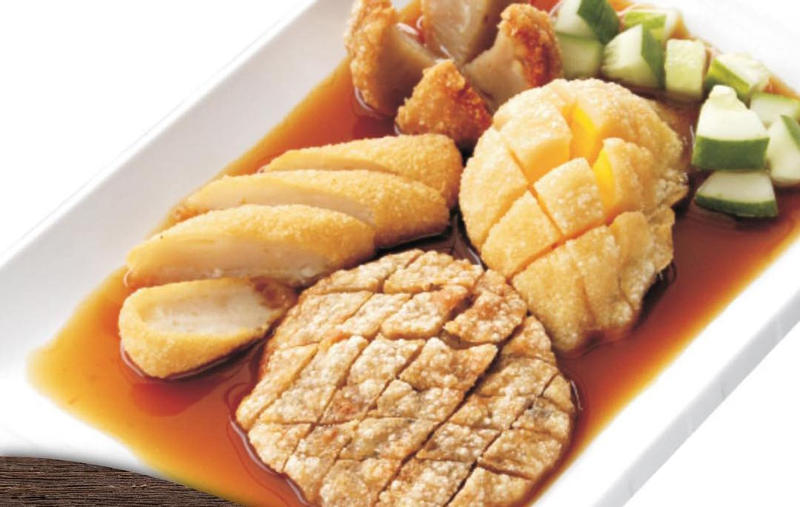
Various shapes and variants of pempek, from top clockwise adaan, kapal selam, kulit, and lenjer.

This fishcake dough can be made into various shapes and forms with additional ingredients. Just like pasta the shapes have their own distinctive names, although all are made from the same dough. There are many varieties of pempek; variants are:

- Pempek kapal selam: (Indonesian: submarine pempek), which is made from a chicken egg wrapped within the pempek dough and then deep-fried. The shape is similar to Chinese dumplings but larger in size. According to food science and technology scientist, the pempek kapal selam, with egg addition, is rich in protein, fat, vitamin A, mineral, and carbohydrate content, is the most nutritious variety. The name is derived from the shape of pempek that resembles a submersible midget submarine.
- Pempek telur kecil: (Indonesian: small egg pempek), filled with egg similar to pempek kapal selam, but only the yolk of the egg and smaller in size.
- Pempek lenjer: long cylindrical pempek; its shape is similar to sausages, and it also can be served in large cylindrical form. A larger variant called lenjer besar is usually cut before being fried and served, or used in other pempek-based dishes like laksan, while a smaller variant called lenjer kecil is usually not fried and is usually served individually or in tekwan.

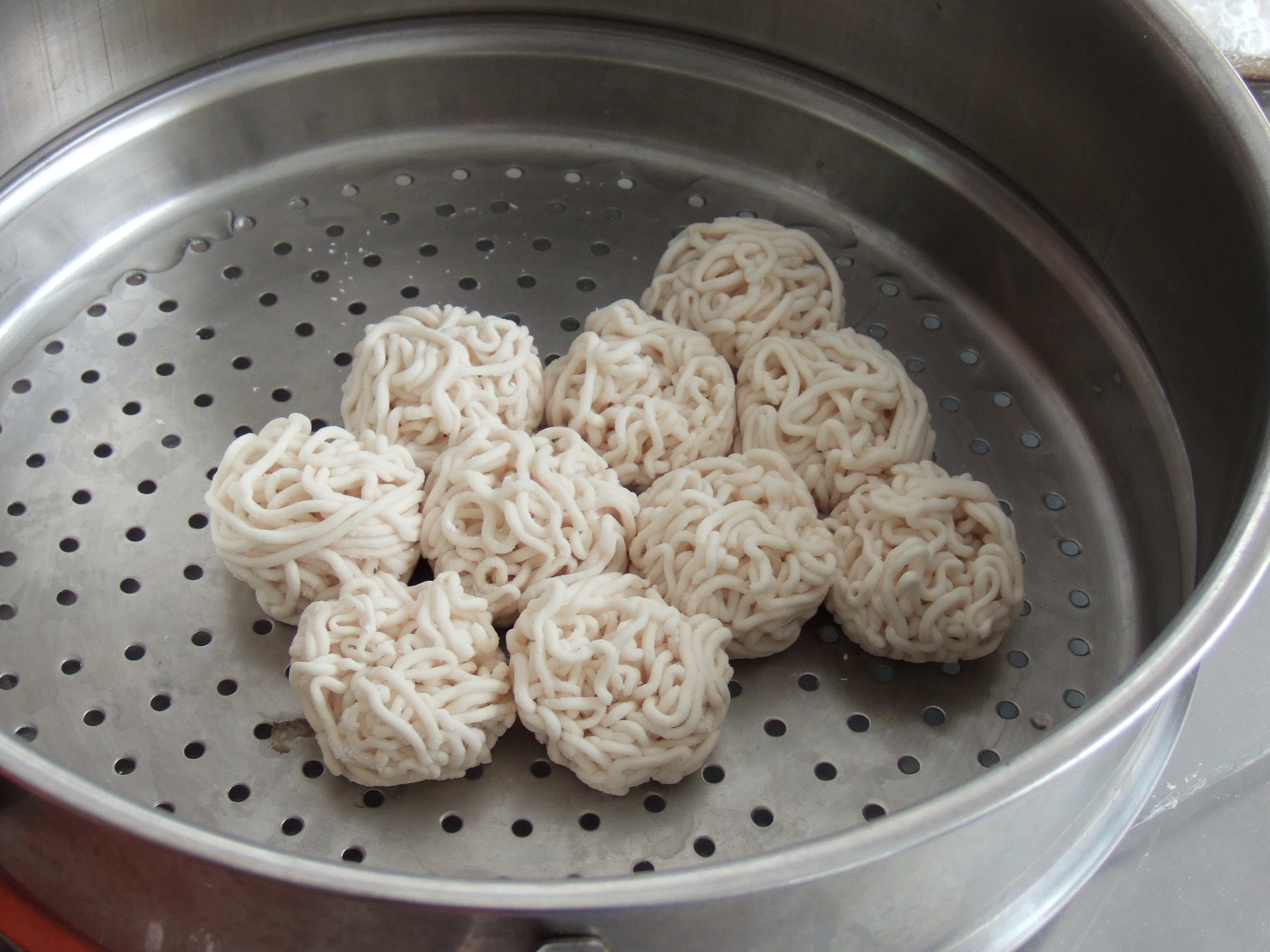
Pempek keriting (curly pempek)

- Pempek keriting: (Indonesian: curly pempek), the dough is made into small noodle ball. This similar process also applied to produce white krupuk.
- Pempek pistel: the shape and size is similar to pempek telur kecil, but filled with minced young papaya instead.
- Pempek kulit: (Indonesian: skin pempek), fish-skin pempek, the dough is mixed with minced fish skin, as the result it has stronger fishy aroma and darker color. Unlike other variants (except pempek panggang which is always grilled), this variant is always fried to cover its stronger fishy aroma.
- Pempek adaan: ball shaped pempek, usually using dough mixed with diced red onions or onion leaves.
- Pempek tahu: tofu sliced and wrapped with pempek dough.

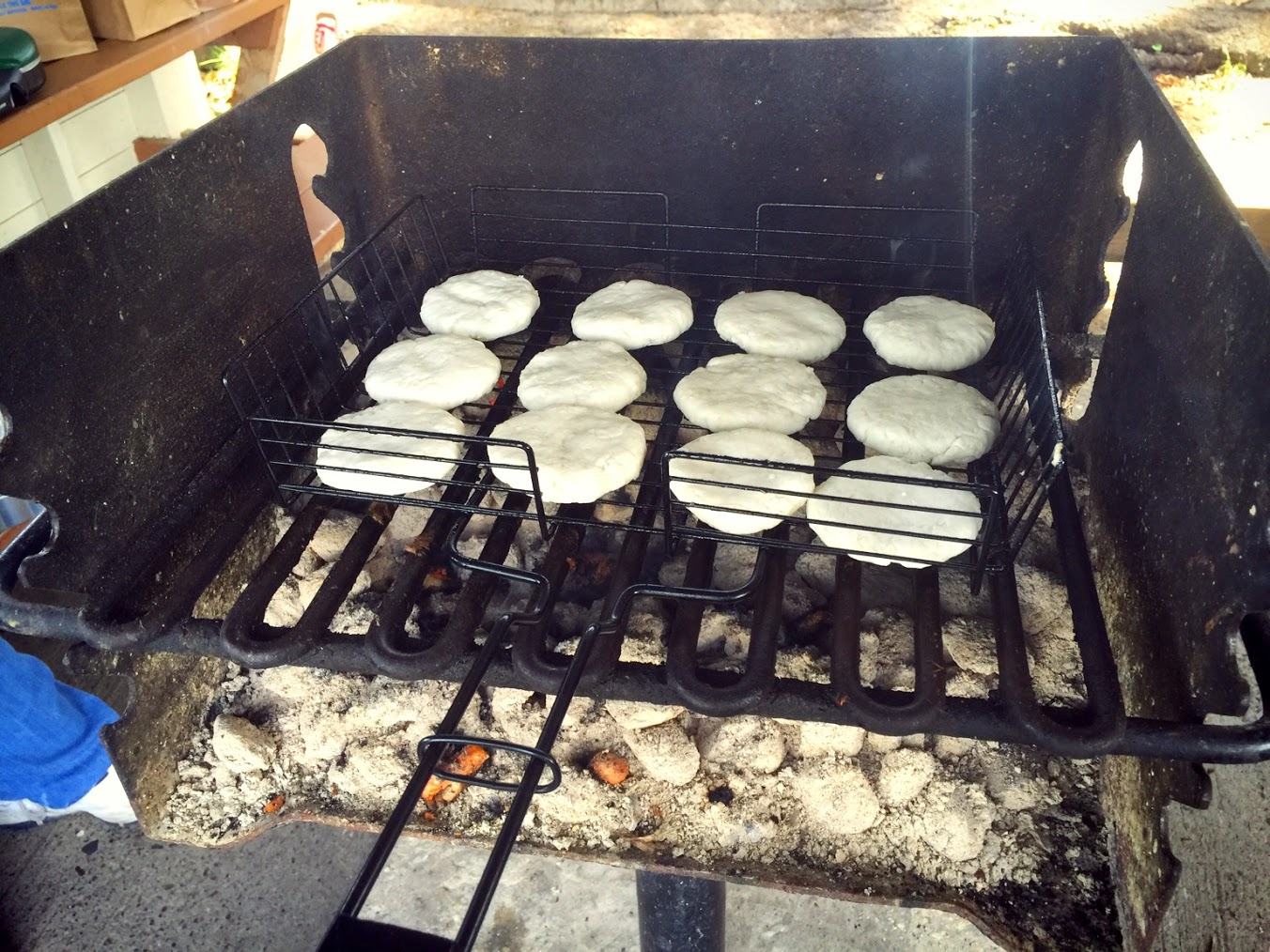
Grilled pempek (pempek tunu)

- Pempek tunu/pempek panggang: charcoal-grilled pempek stuffed with ebi, sweet kecap sauce and chilli sauce. The dried shrimp and sauces are added later after grilling, so sometimes the dried shrimp is omitted for people allergic to shrimp or the chili sauce held for people that can't eat spicy food. More commonly sold in street stalls because it's easier and cheaper to use charcoal than cooking oil.
- Pempek model (model iwak): tofu wrapped inside pempek dough. Similar to pempek kapal selam, but the egg is replaced with tofu. Sometimes instead of being served with cuko, it is served in shrimp soup. It is also sometimes served in batagor.
- Pempek uyen/bujan: curly pempek made from taro and fish from Bangka.

Most of those forms of pempek are deep fried in cooking oil until light brown, and are served with yellow noodles or rice vermicelli and kuah cuko, sprinkled with chopped cucumber and ebi powder.

The pempek fishcake can be used as a base ingredient of other dishes. The unfried cylindrical pempek lenjer is often cut and added as a mixture to the following dishes:

- Celimpungan: small pempek balls cooked in spicy coconut milk, served with chilli and sprinkled with bawang goreng (fried shallots).
- Laksan: often referred to as Palembang style pempek in laksa soup, sliced pempek fishcake served in coconut milk based soup.
- Lenggang: omelette with mixture of sliced pempek fishcake, also served in kuah cuko.
- Tekwan: chopped pempek fishcake soup with jicama, mushroom, fishballs served with shrimp broth.
- Model: fried pempek dough filled with tofu inside, also served with shrimp broth. A variation of model called model gendum is made from wheat flour.

== Outlets ==
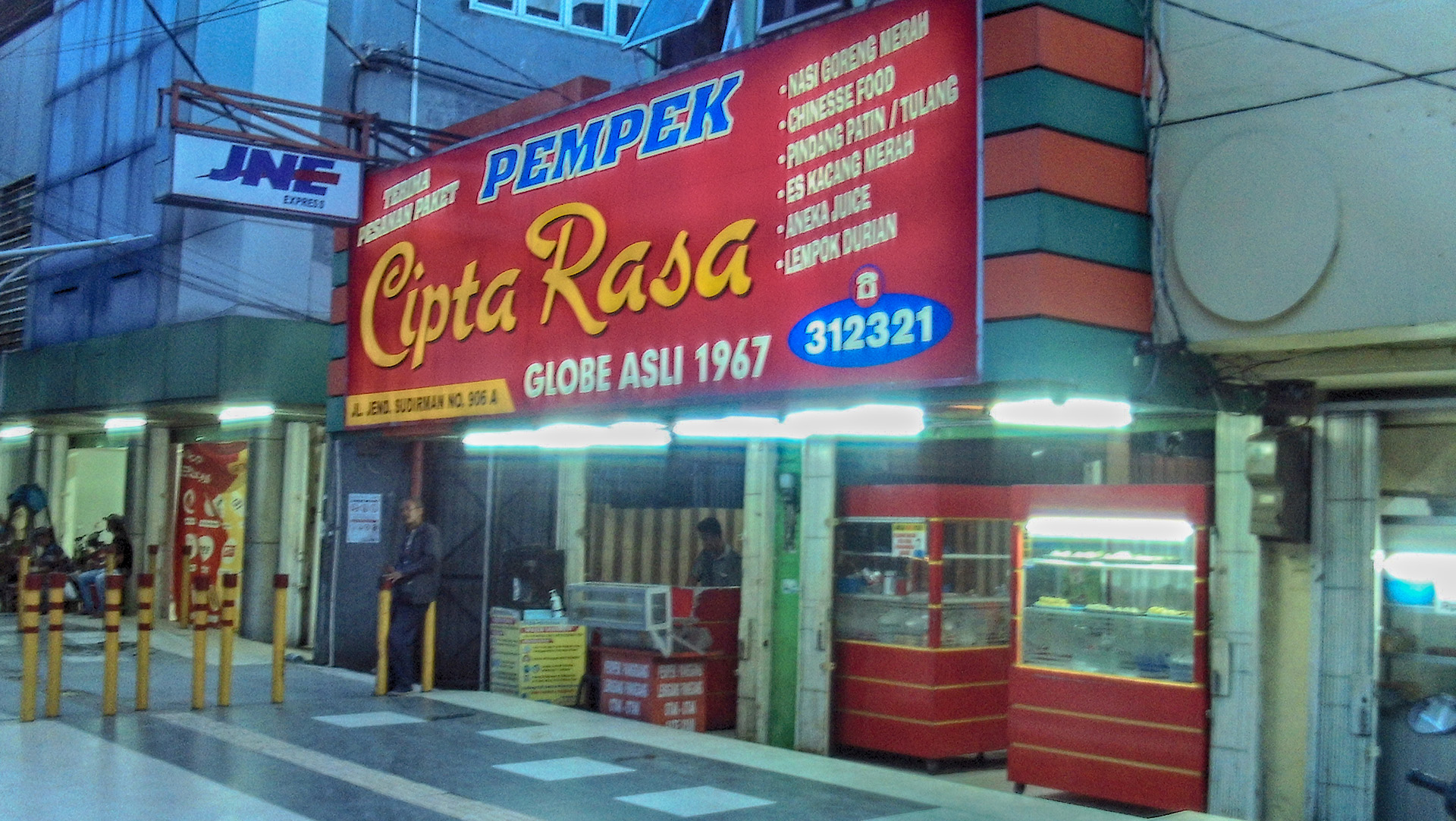
A pempek restaurant in Palembang.

As a local specialty, pempek can be commonly found on every street in Palembang with a concentration of outlets in downtown Palembang. Pempek can also be found in other regions, especially in major cities in Indonesia. However, the taste of pempek in other regions usually differs from Palembang pempek. The main ingredients such as fish and flour are scarce or difficult to find in other regions causing the difference in taste.

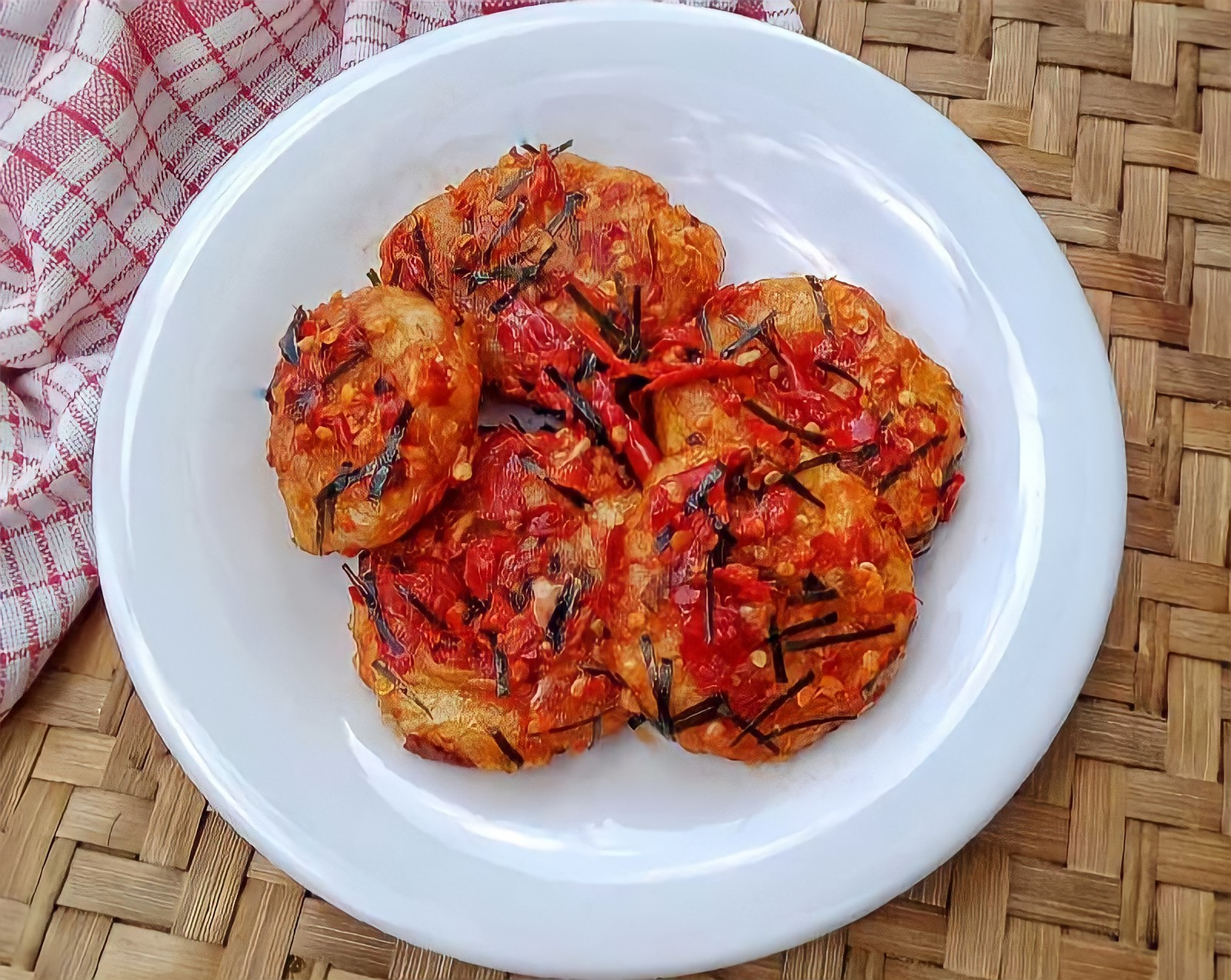
Pempek sambal, a variant from neighboring city of Jambi

Pempek is easy to find in Jakarta and other Indonesian cities, from the food-courts in malls and shopping centers to traveling pempek vendors on carts. The cheaper pempek version sold by traveling vendors on carts generally use less fish and more tapioca, resulting in a rather bland flavour.

The fame of South Sumatran Palembang's pempek has influenced some neighbouring provinces, which also in return has developed their own pempek variants. Pempek is also a popular dish in South Sumatra's neighboring province capital city Jambi and Bandar Lampung, and also the neighbouring island of Bangka.

Some pempek establishments, such as Pempek Pak Raden and Pempek Bunga Mas are opening branches all over major food courts. In Jakarta, the notable pempek outlets are Pempek Megaria in Metropole cinema complex, Central Jakarta. It is among the oldest pempek establishments in the city. Other pempek outlets are those in Pasar Minggu market, South Jakarta. In Yogyakarta, one of the leading pempek establishments in the city is Pempek Ny. Kamto located near Malioboro street.

Outside Indonesia, pempek establishments can be found in Singapore, Malaysia and Australia. As Palembang is not far from Singapore and Malaysia, to ensure the authenticity some pempek establishments import boiled unfried frozen pempek dumplings in vacuum packages straight from Palembang. These ready to cook pempek dumplings are also popularly sold in Palembang as oleh-oleh foodstuff gifts or souvenirs for visitors from other Indonesian cities.

== See also ==
- Crab cake
- Kemplang
- Kerupuk
- Lekor
- Ngo hiang, a similar dish made with fish
- Otak-otak
- Palembang cuisine
- Crab cake
