= Nasi bakar =

Indonesian traditional steamed rice

Nasi Bakar
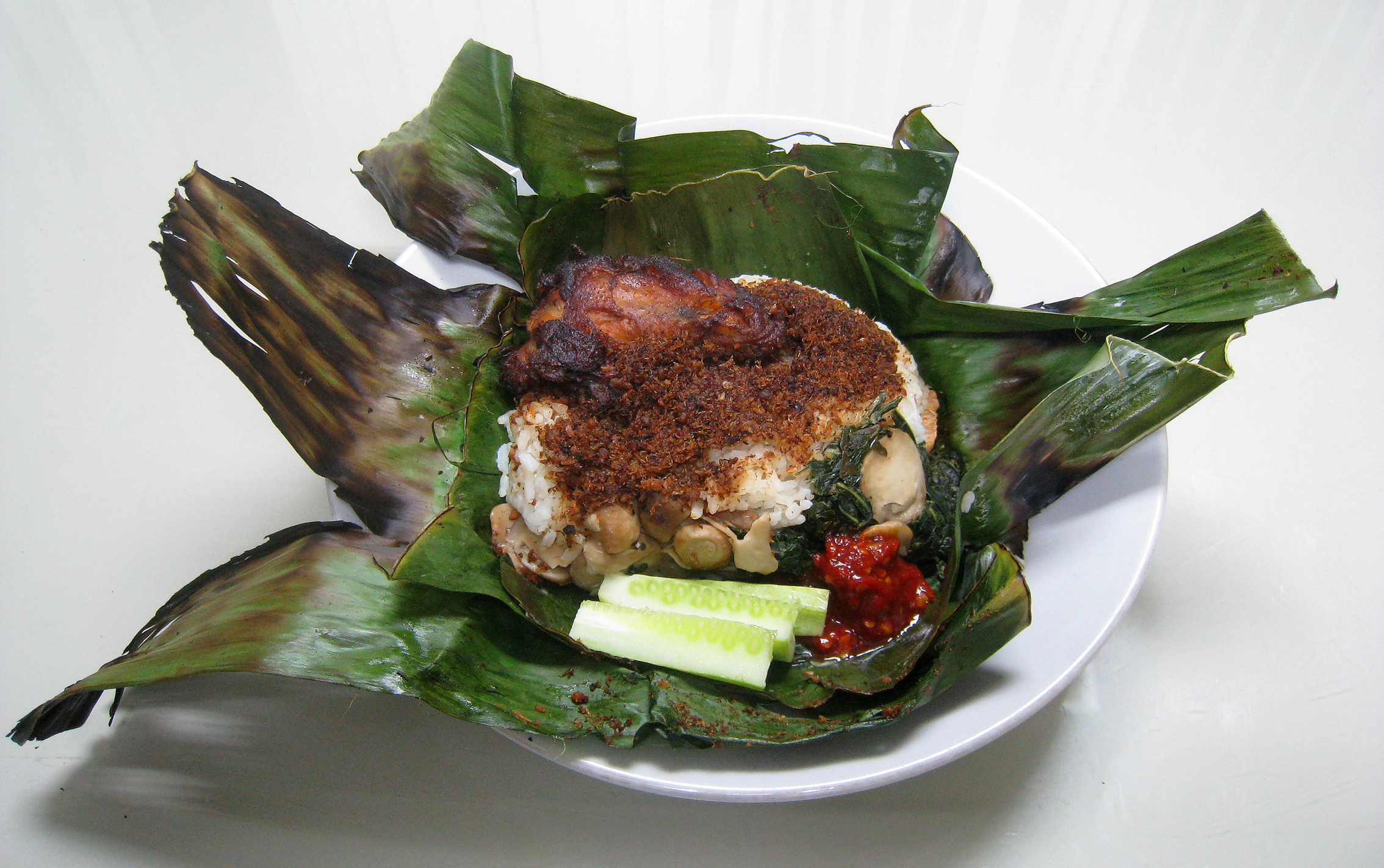
- Nasi bakar seasoned rice dish with fried chicken, mushroom, vegetables, and sambal, wrapped inside bana leaf and grilled upon charcoal fire.
- Course: Main course
- Place of origin: Indonesia
- Region or state: Nationwide
- Serving temperature: Hot
- Main ingredients: Seasoned rice with various ingredients wrapped in banana leaf and grilled upon charcoal fire.

Nasi bakar (Indonesian for "burned or grilled rice") refers to steamed rice seasoned with spices and ingredients and wrapped in banana leaf secured with lidi semat (a small needle made of a central rib of coconut leaf) and later grilled upon charcoal fire. The burned banana leaf produced a unique aroma on the rice. The banana leaf package is opened upon consumption. It is a relatively newly developed Indonesian dish around the early 2000s, probably derived from nasi timbel rice wrapped in banana leaves.

There are many variants of nasi bakar according to its ingredients, such as fried chicken, empal gepuk (fried beef), anchovy, peda fish, milkfish, salted fish, shrimp, mushroom, tempeh, tofu, salted duck egg etc.

== Gallery ==
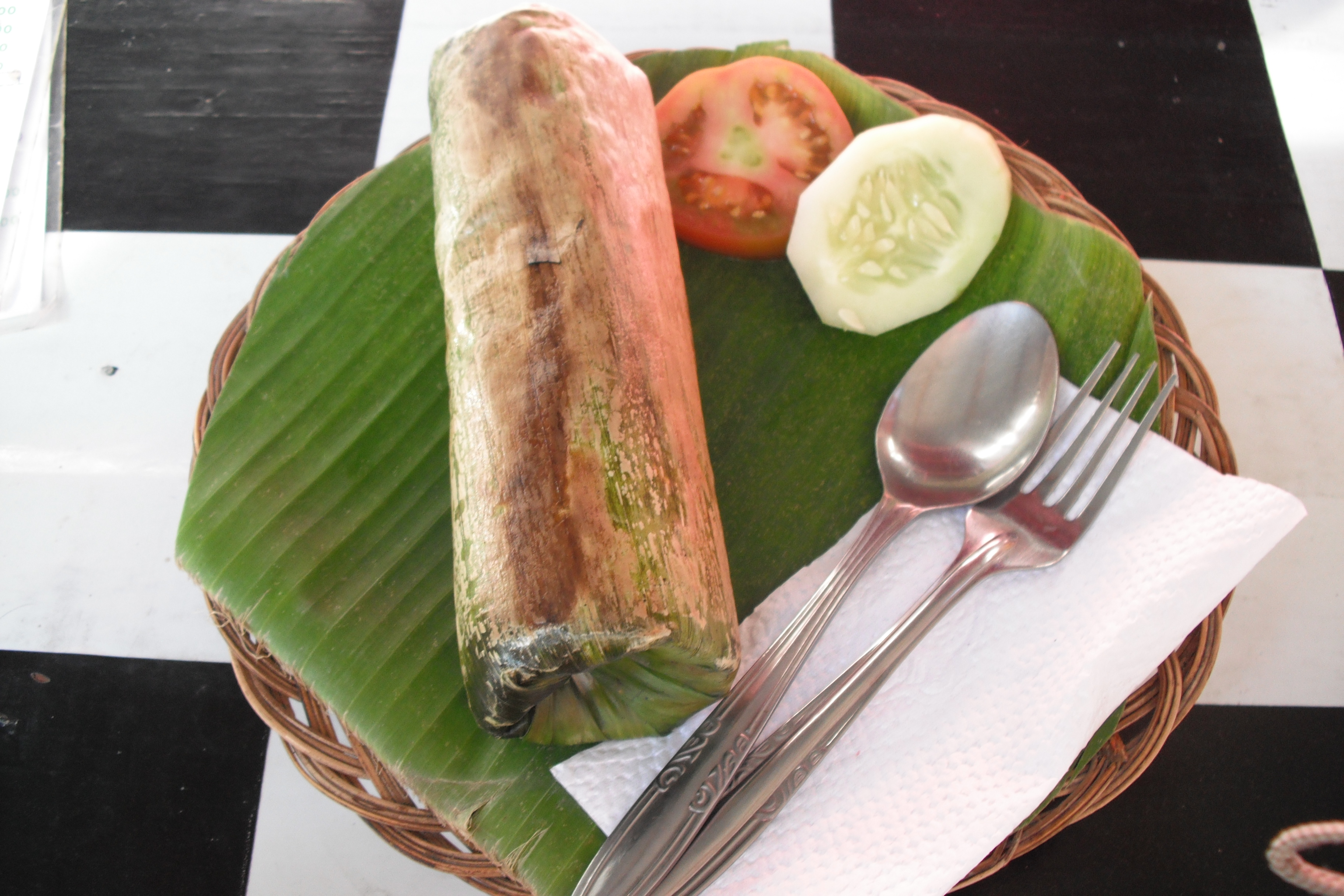
Wrapped nasi bakar ayam (chicken grilled rice)

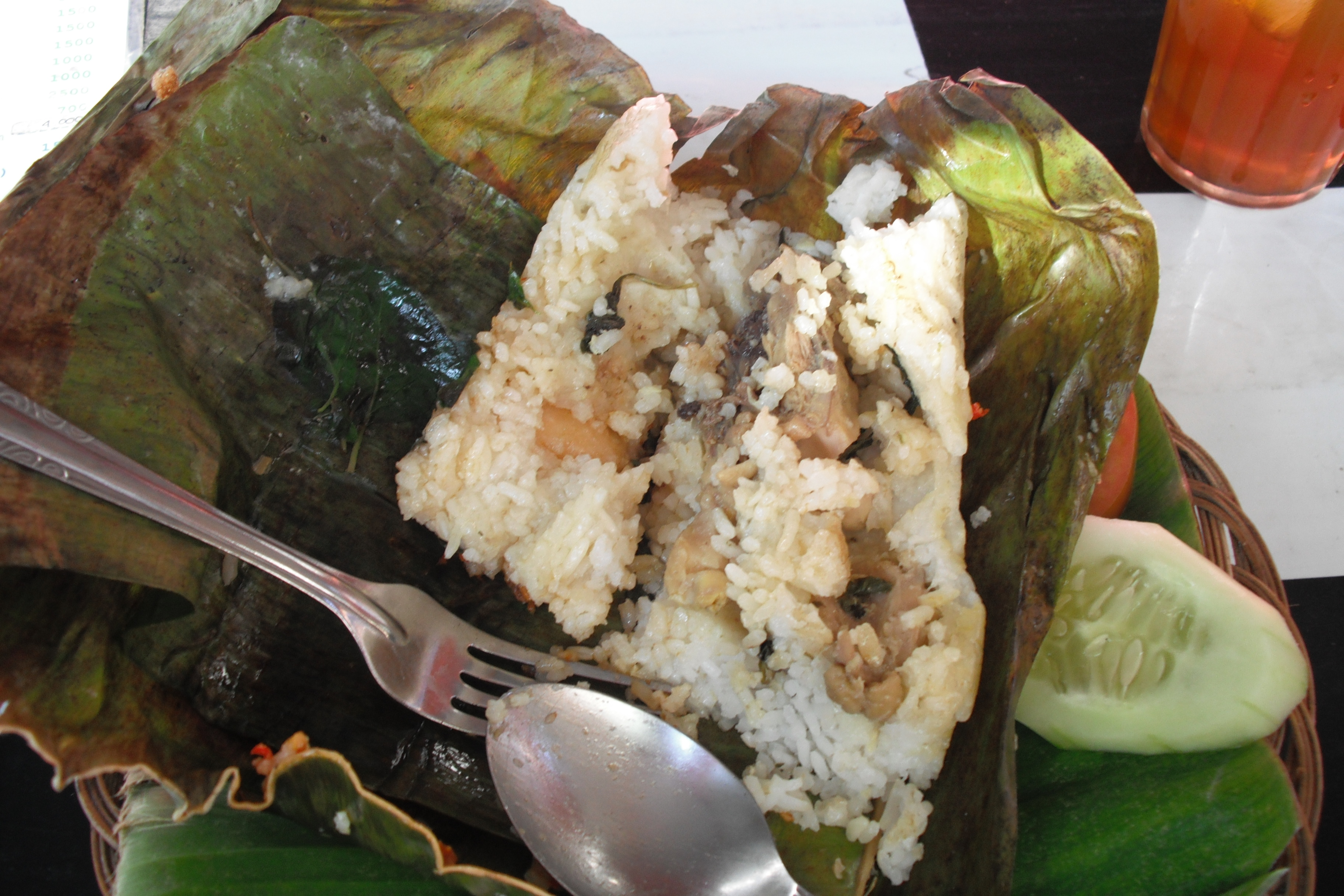
Nasi bakar ayam, chicken rice baked in a banana leaf

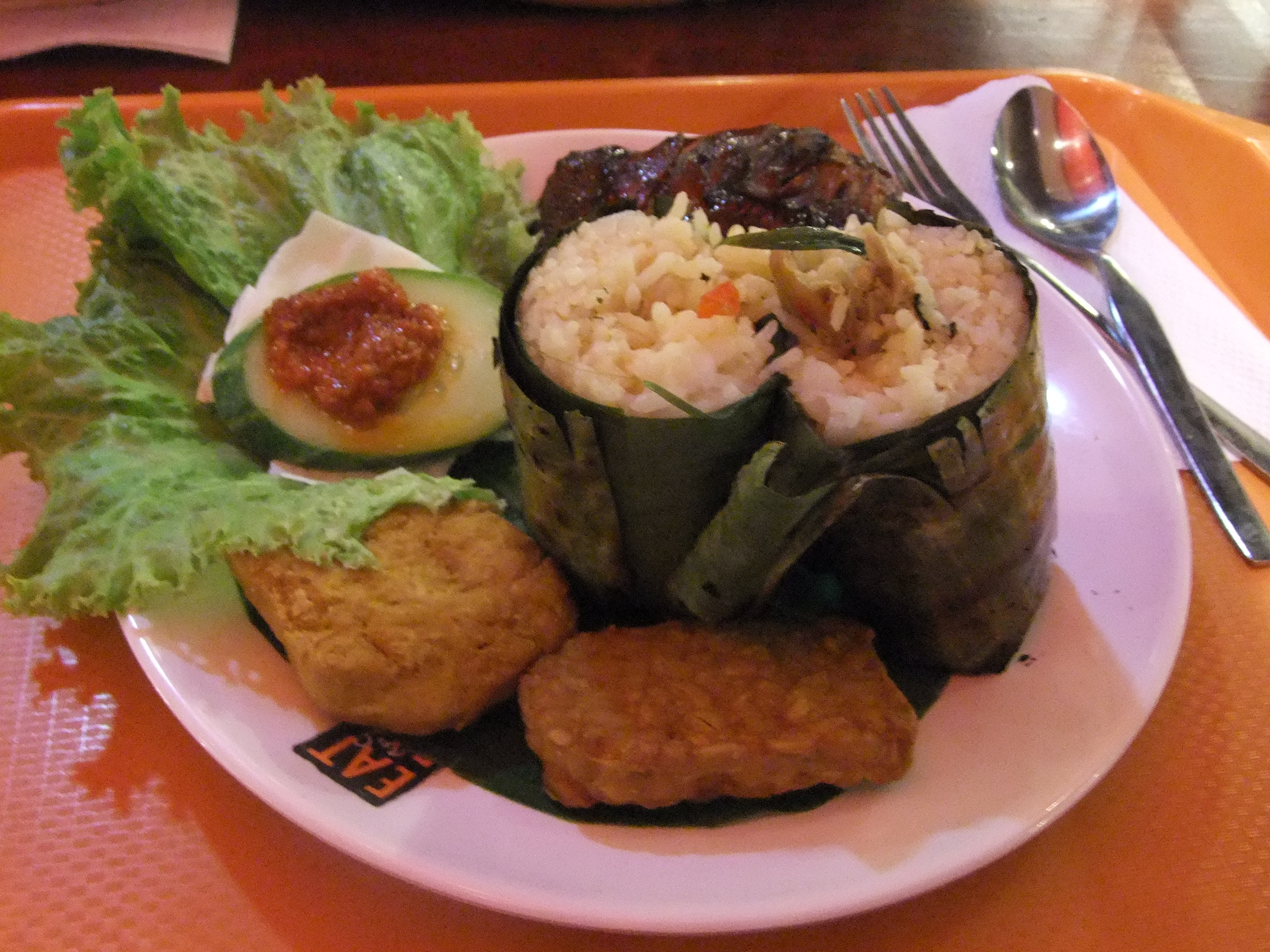
Nasi bakar ayam with tempeh and tofu

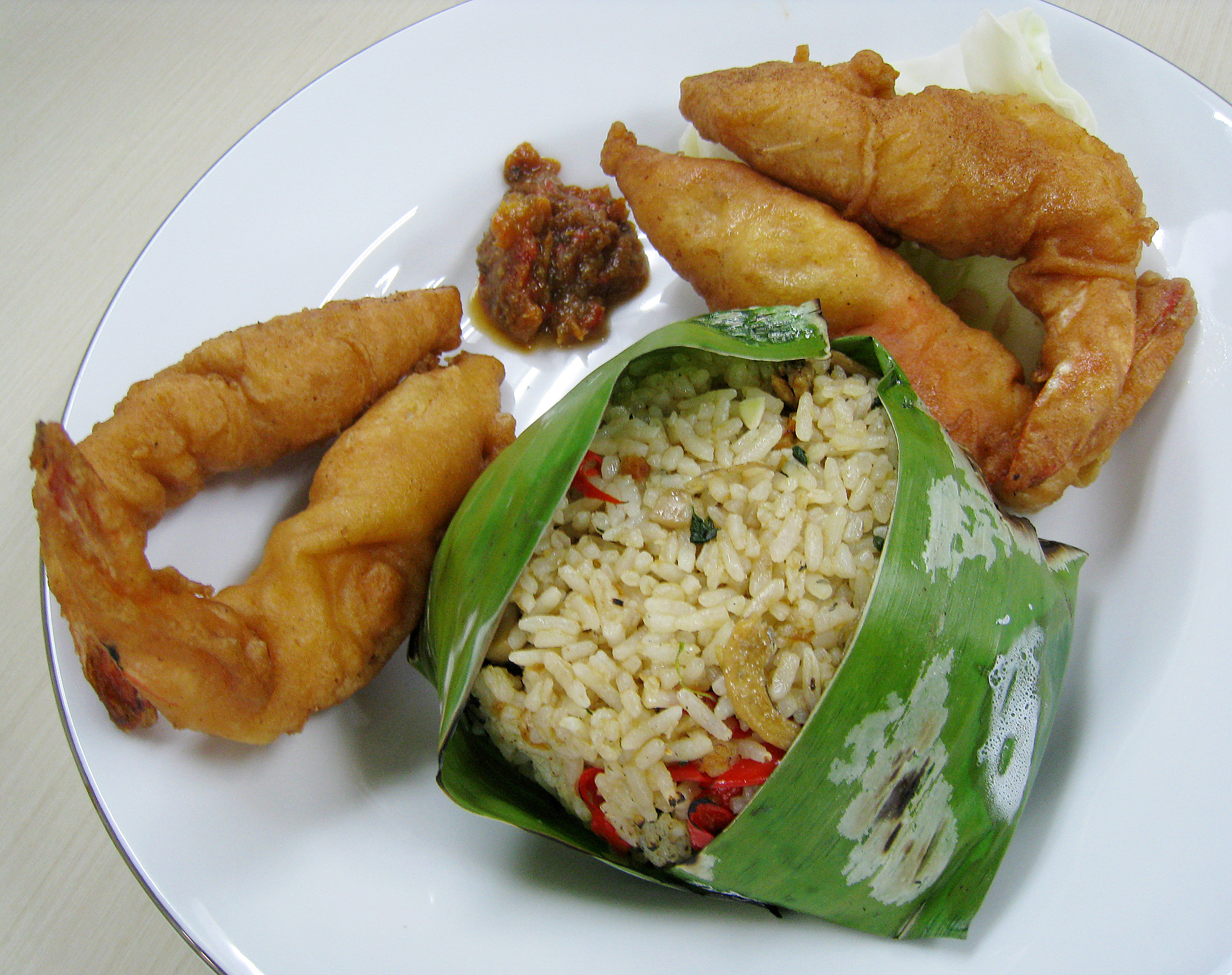
Nasi bakar teri (anchovy) with fried prawn and sambal as side dishes

== See also ==
- Nasi liwet
- Nasi timbel
- Nasi uduk
- Nasi bogana
- Nasi lemak
