= Nasi kebuli =

Arab Indonesian rice dish

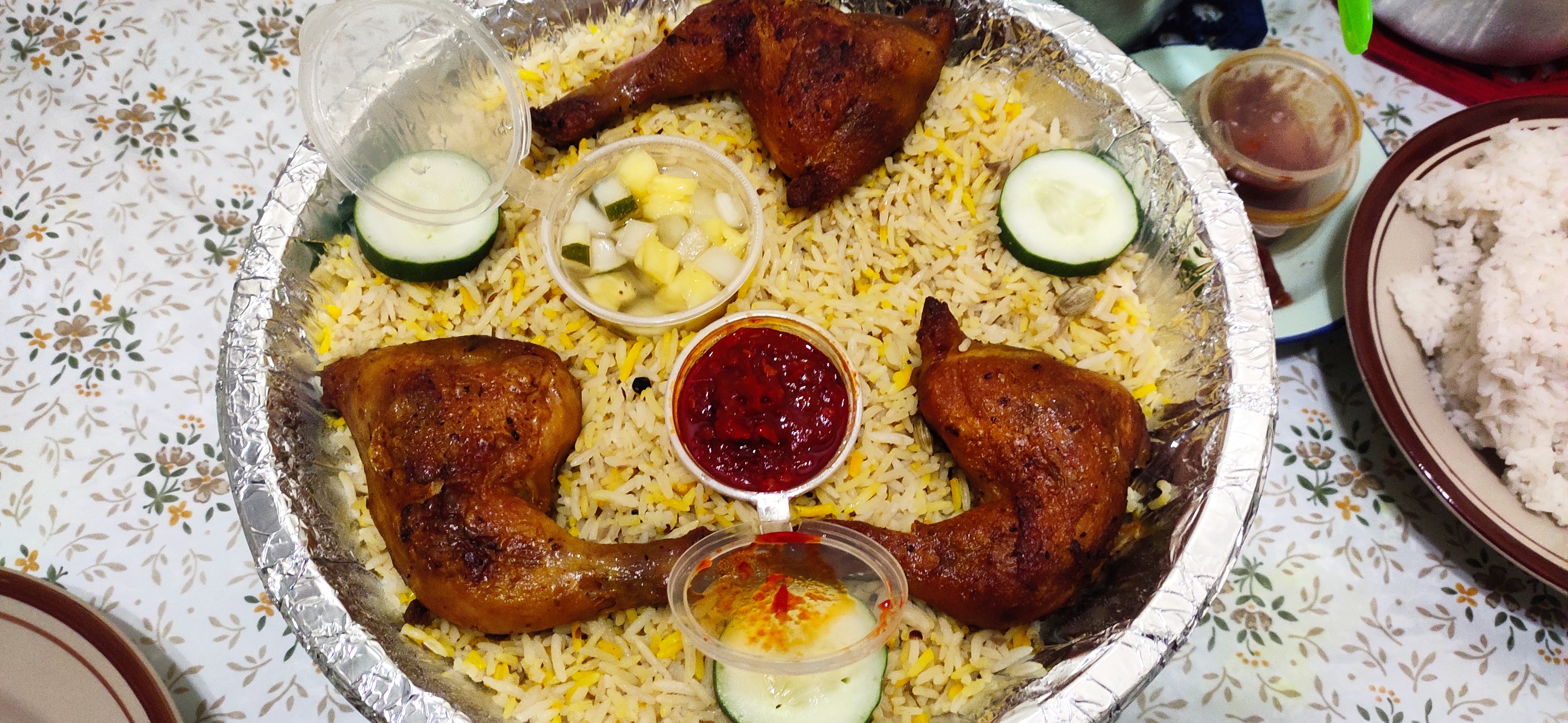
- A plate of nasi kebuli with condiments such as Acar and Sambal
- Type: pilaf
- Course: Main course
- Place of origin: Indonesia
- Region or state: Jakarta, Central Java and East Java
- Created by: Arab Indonesians
- Serving temperature: Hot
- Main ingredients: Rice with minyak samin (ghee) spiced and served with chicken or goat meat

Nasi kebuli (kabuli rice; Arabic: الرز الكابلى; Arabic pronunciation: [ka:buli:]) is an Indonesian variation of pilaf. It consists of rice cooked in goat meat broth, goat milk, and clarified butter (most often ghee). It is popular among the Arab community in Indonesia (most prominent in Arab-descent Betawi in Greater Jakarta). Nasi kebuli was influenced by Arab culture and its origin can be traced to Middle eastern cuisine, especially Yemeni Arabian influence (mandi rice or kabsa), Indian cuisine influence (biryani rice), and Afghan influence (kabuli palaw).

In Betawi culture, nasi kebuli is usually served during Islamic religious festivities, such as Eid al-Fitr, Eid al-Adha or Mawlid. Outside Jakarta, nasi kebuli is mainly popular in regions with significant population of Arab Indonesians, such as West Java, Banten, Surakarta, Surabaya, Gresik and Banyuwangi.

== Origin ==
The name kebuli is derived from kabuli palaw, which is an Afghan variety of pilaf, similar to Indian biryani, but with heavy influence of Hadhrami and Indian cuisine such as Mandi and Biryani in the cooking methods and seasoning.

The Middle Eastern version of kabuli rice is more similar to kabuli palaw than Indonesian nasi kebuli. The word pilaf, palau or palaw simply means a rice dish cooked with a seasoned broth. According to history, the dish was brought to the Middle-East from the Indian subcontinent and Central Asia. One distinction is the presence of shredded carrots and perhaps grapes in the Middle-east or Afghan version of Kebuli.

== Preparation ==
Nasi kebuli is made by cooking rice soaked in goat meat broth with milk or coconut milk instead of water. The goat meat is later cooked and mixed with sauteed spice mixture in a clarified butter (often with ghee, locally known as minyak samin). The spice mixture is made from ground garlic, shallot, ginger, black pepper, clove, coriander, caraway, cardamom, cinnamon, nutmeg, salt, and ghee. Then the goat meat, spices and sliced tomatoes are boiled together with half cooked rice in milk until completely cooked.

Nasi kebuli is usually served with asinan nanas (pineapple in spicy and sour sauce) or sometimes also topped with sambal goreng hati (cow liver in spicy sambal sauce) and sprinkled with raisins and sometimes nuts. In Indonesian Hadhrami community, sometimes it is served along with maraq soup (spice lamb/goat soup of Arab origin).

== See also ==
- List of goat dishes
- Nasi bogana
- Nasi campur
- Nasi goreng
- Nasi kucing
- Nasi kuning
- Nasi lemak
- Nasi liwet
- Nasi minyak
- Nasi pecel
- Nasi uduk
- Nasi ulam
