= Nasi timbel =

Indonesian rice dish

Nasi Timbel
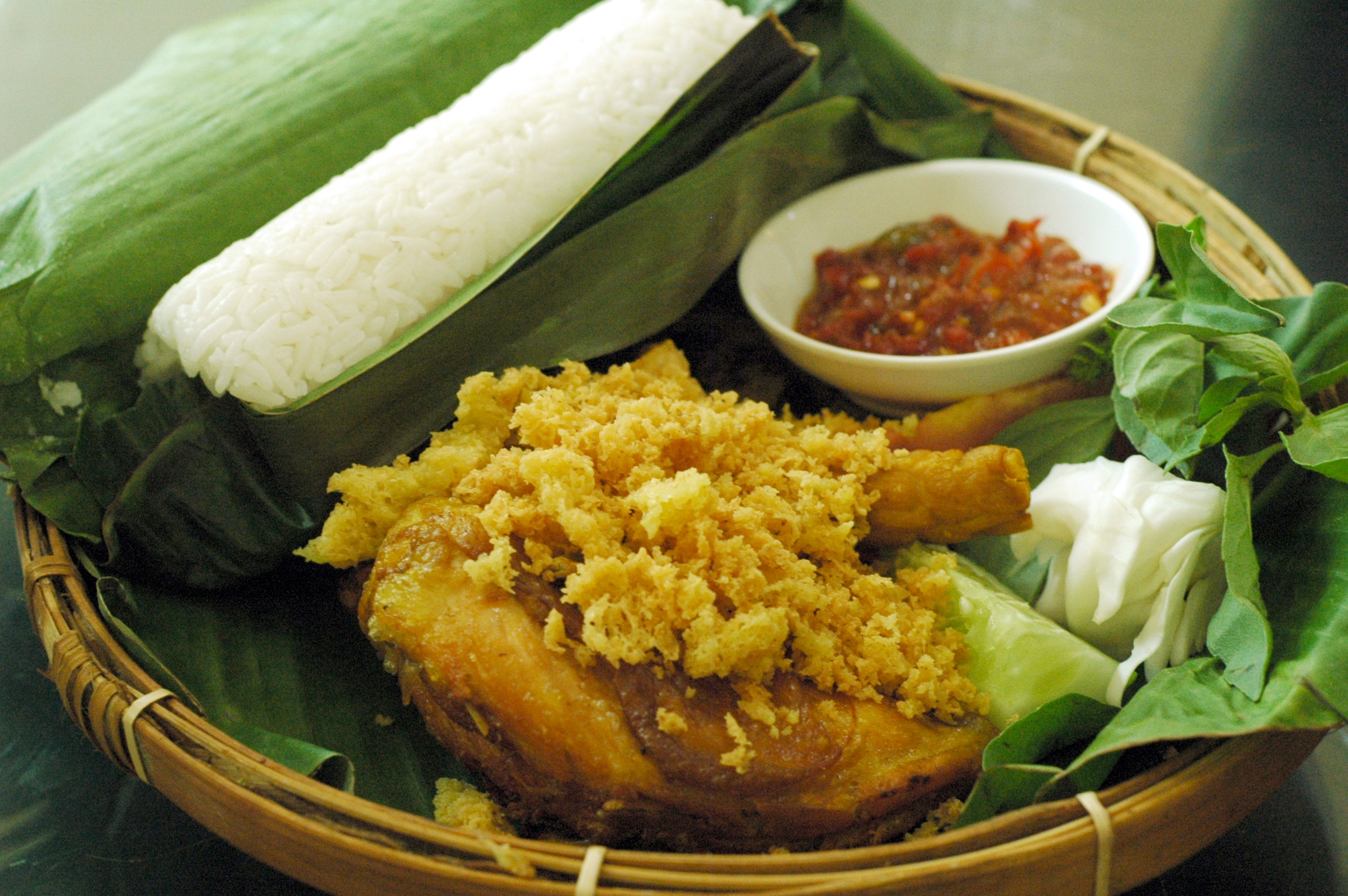
- Nasi timbel rice dish with ayam penyet.
- Course: Main course
- Place of origin: Indonesia
- Region or state: Bandung, West Java
- Serving temperature: Hot
- Main ingredients: Hot steamed rice wrapped in banana leaf surrounded with side dishes

Nasi timbel is an Indonesian hot dish, consisting of steamed rice wrapped inside a banana leaf. It is a traditional Sundanese cuisine from West Java. The heat of the hot-cooked rice touches the banana leaf and produces a unique aroma. It is made in ways similar to making lontong; compressed, rolled, and wrapped in banana leaves; it then evolves into a complete dish served with various side dishes such as fried chicken, empal gepuk (fried beef), jambal roti (salted fish), tahu goreng, tempeh, salted duck egg, sayur asem, with lalab and sambal. Nasi timbel later evolved to nasi bakar.

== See also ==
- Nasi bakar
- Nasi bogana
- Nasi lemak
- Nasi liwet
- Nasi tutug oncom
- Nasi uduk
