= Nasi ulam =

Rice dish of the Malay people across Indonesia and Malaysia

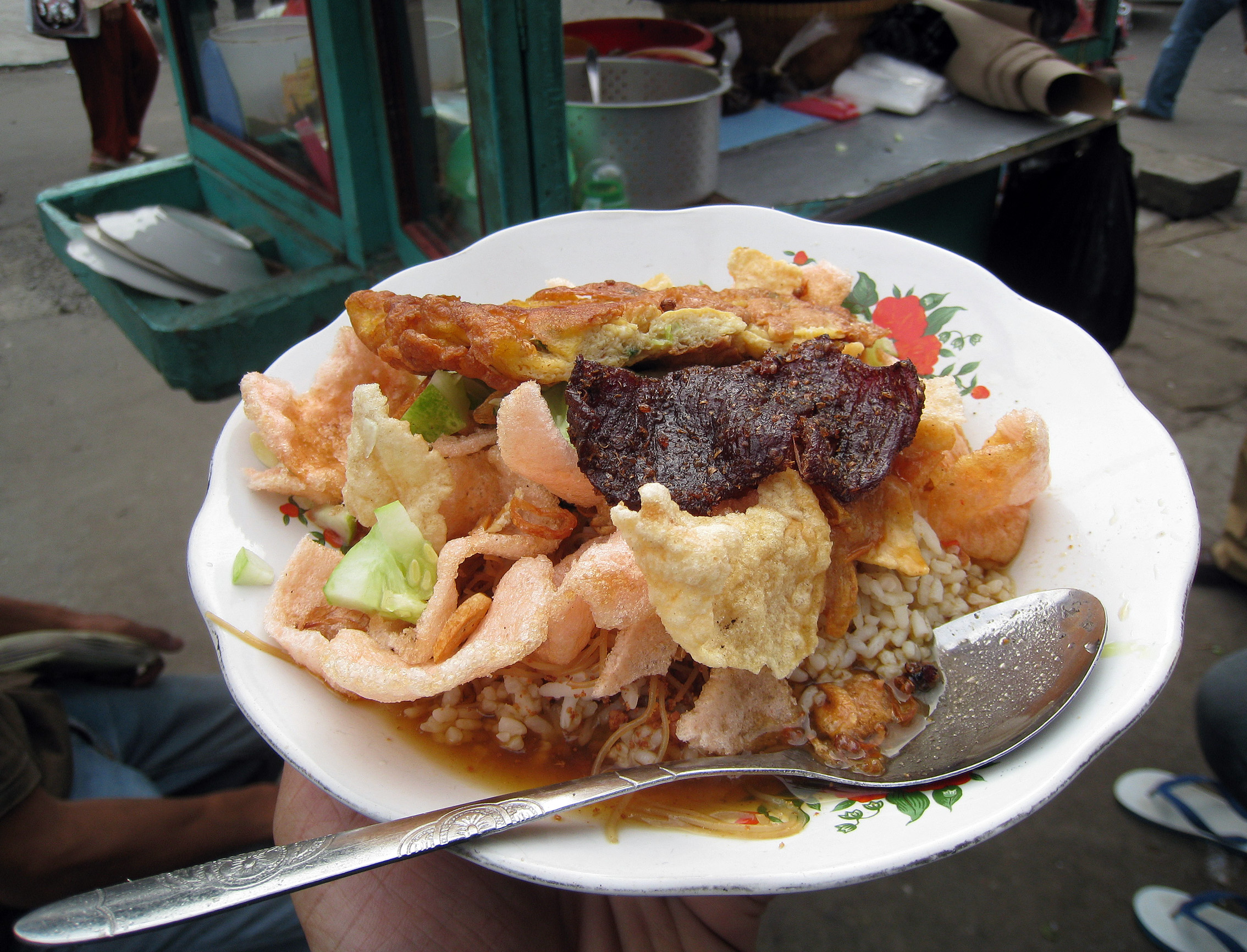
- Nasi ulam Betawi (Jakarta) style, topped with dendeng sapi (beef jerky), krupuk, and omelette.
- Course: Main course
- Region or state: Jakarta, Java and Kedah, Malay Peninsula
- Associated cuisine: Southern Thailand, Malaysia, Singapore and Indonesia
- Main ingredients: Steamed rice dish mixed with various herbs
- Variations: Rich variations across the respective region

Nasi ulam is a traditional rice dish of Betawi, Malay (especially of the northern Malay Peninsular) and Peranakan cuisines that mixes various traditional herbs and vegetables (ulam) mostly the leaves of pegagan (Centella asiatica), kemangi (lemon basil), Vietnamese mint, and torch ginger among other things, accompanied with various side dishes.

This dish is a feature of with many variations and is commonly found in Indonesia, Malaysia, Singapore, and southern Thailand. Nasi ulam is often served with sambal chilli paste.

== History ==
=== In Indonesia ===
Nasi ulam is a typical Betawi mixed rice. Nasi ulam is a cross of several culinary cultures that influence the variant of the nasi ulam and its side dishes. Some say that white rice topped with coconut serundeng (ulam) and peanuts is an Indian influence. In Indonesia, Nasi Ulam is not only found in Jakarta but also Sumatra and Bali. Ulam in Betawi language is the name for serundeng from grated coconut, which when stirred with hot white rice will bring out a savory and slightly spicy taste on the tongue.

The history of Nasi Ulam comes from Tangerang, Banten. Unfortunately, this dish is rarely known by the surrounding community and is more associated with cuisine from Jakarta. This is because, in the past, a large number of Nasi Ulam traders from Tangerang brought the dish to Glodok, Jakarta. The cuisine was enjoyed by the local community, particularly Chinese Indonesians.

Not all Betawi people in Jakarta are familiar with all variations of Nasi Ulam, both wet (basah) and dry (kering). Wet ulam is only known among the Cina Benteng, Petak Sembilan, kawasan Pecinan, Tanjung Priok, Kemayoran, Matraman, dan Senen. Meanwhile, dried ulam is known in the Tebet, Kayumanis, and Mester Jatinegara areas. Betawi people usually eat rice ulam in the morning as one of the breakfast menus.

=== In Malaysia ===
Nasi ulam comes from Kedah, in northern Peninsular Malaysia created by Kedahan Malays. Ulam comes from the Malay word meaning vegetables which are tradisional Malay raw vegetables. Nasi ulam in Malaysia needs three components which are carbohydrates (rice), protein (fried fish) and vegetables (ulam). The main ingredients are at least five to ten types of tradisional Malay raw vegetables (Ulam; cosmos caudatus leaves, cashew leaves, water celery, wild betel leaves, torch ginger, Vietnamese coriander) galangal, lemongrass, ginger, red onion, black pepper, shredded fried fish and rice. It is mixed in a large bowl then added Kerisik (Malaysian coconut paste) mix again then serve on a plate. The six main ingredients at the beginning are traditional Malay vegetables. Nasi ulam in Malaysia is healthier than Nasi ulam Betawi.

Meanwhile, the Penang Peranakan version of Nasi Ulam has ingredients like Vietnamese coriander leaves, mint leaves, kaffir lime leaves, turmeric leaf, wild betel leaves, sand ginger leaves, fresh shallot, lemongrass, salted fish, dried shrimps, grated coconut & pepper. The five main ingredients ahead are the main ingredients of Peranakan cuisine in Malaysia.

It is different from Nasi ulam betawi which only puts components such as vegetables, meat and crackers as a side dish. If you want to eat it, just mix it.

== Variants ==
=== Indonesia ===
In Indonesia, nasi ulam can be found in Betawi (native Jakartans) cuisine as well as Bali and Sumatran Malay.

In Jakarta there are two types of nasi ulam, the wet (soupy) nasi ulam of northern and central Jakarta, and dry one of southern Jakarta. In Indonesia, nasi ulam usually spiced with kemangi herb, chili, sliced cucumber and sprinkled with peanuts granule and serundeng (grated and sauteed coconut). An array of other additional dishes are often added on top of nasi ulam, such as dendeng (beef jerky), telur dadar (omelette), perkedel (mashed potato fritter), fried tofu or tempeh, and krupuk.

=== Malaysia ===
Nasi ulam in Malaysia consist of cold boiled rice that is mixed with shredded herbs such as daun kaduk (wild pepper leaf), pucuk gajus (cashew leaf shoots), onions etc. Kerisik and other spices are also added. Sometimes shredded fried fish is mixed in. This version is common in northwest Peninsular Malaysia. A type of nasi ulam in northeast Peninsular Malaysia, in which the rice is dyed blue, is called nasi kerabu.

== See also ==
- Ulam (salad)
- Nasi bogana
- Nasi campur
- Nasi goreng
- Nasi kebuli
- Nasi kerabu
- Nasi kucing
- Nasi kuning
- Nasi lemak
- Nasi liwet
- Nasi pecel
- Nasi tim
- Nasi uduk
