= Nasi kucing =

Indonesian rice dish

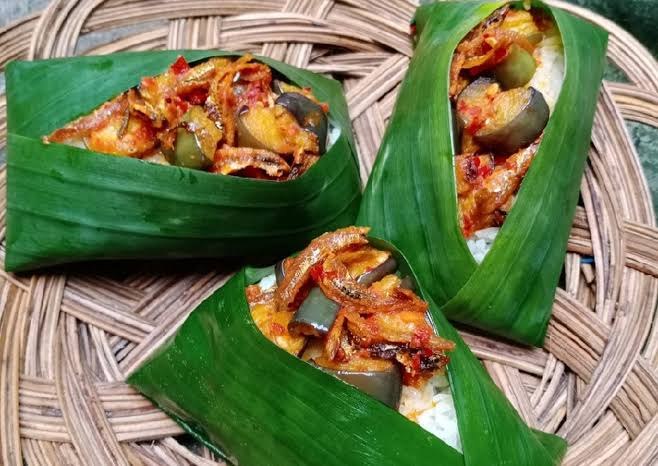
- Indonesian mixed rice with various toppings, served in small portion
- Course: Main course
- Place of origin: Indonesia
- Region or state: Yogyakarta, Central Java
- Serving temperature: Hot or room temperature
- Main ingredients: Rice in small portion with various side dishes wrapped inside banana leaf
- Food energy (per serving): 100 calories

Nasi kucing (from Javanese ꦤꦱꦶꦏꦸꦕꦶꦁ 'nasi kucing'; Javanese: [ˈnasi ˈkutʃɪŋ], lit. 'small-portioned dish') is an Indonesian rice dish that originated in Central Java, primarily in the Yogyakarta, Semarang, and Surakarta areas but has since spread throughout the country. It consists of a small portion of rice with toppings, usually sambal, dried fish, and tempeh, wrapped in banana leaves.

== Etymology ==
The term nasi kucing, literally meaning "cat rice" or "cat's rice", is derived from its portion size; it is similar in size to what the Javanese would serve to a pet cat, hence the name.

== Origin ==
Nasi kucing originated in the Yogyakarta, Semarang, and Surakarta areas, but has since spread to Jakarta, other parts of the country, and as far as Mecca, sold by Indonesian workers during the hajj.

== Presentation ==
Nasi kucing consists of a small, fist-sized portion of rice with some toppings. Common toppings include sambal, dried fish, and tempeh. Other ingredients include egg, chicken, and cucumber can be added to nasi kucing. It is served ready-made, wrapped in a banana leaf, which is further wrapped in paper.

A variation of nasi kucing, sega macan (English: tiger's rice) is three times the size of a regular portion of nasi kucing. It is served with roasted rice, dried fish, and vegetables. Like nasi kucing, sega macan is served wrapped in a banana leaf and paper.

== Sales ==
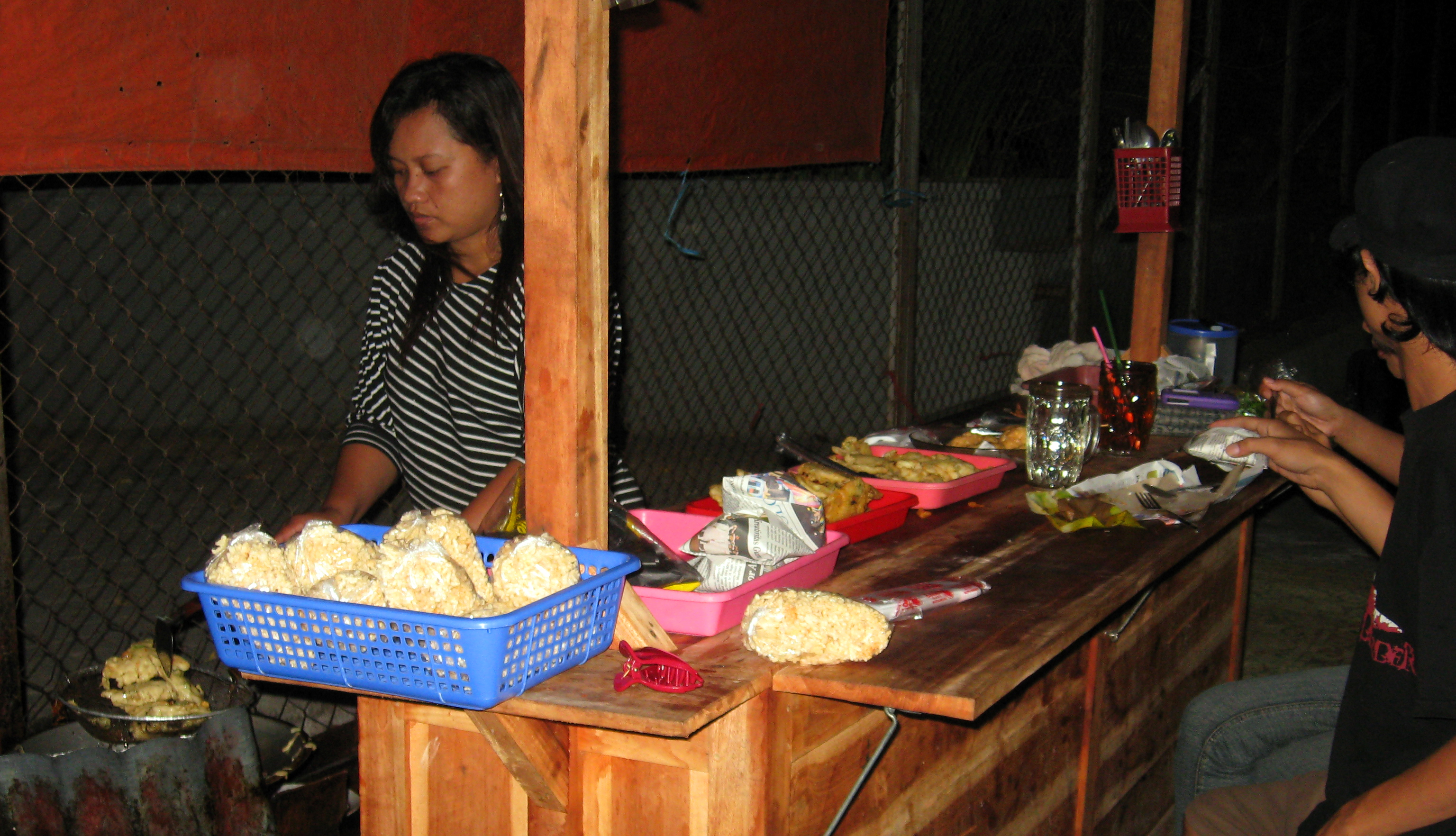
A seller at an angkringan, preparing tempeh with wrapped nasi kucing visible in the foreground

Nasi kucing is often sold at a low price (sometimes as low as Rp 1,000 for nasi kucing and Rp 4,000 for sega macan) at small, road-side food stalls called angkringan, which are frequented by working-class people, or wong cilik, including pedicab and taxi drivers, students, and street musicians. This has led to angkringan being considered the "lowest class of eatery".

The owners of the angkringan themselves often come from lower socio-economic classes, may have few or no marketable skills, or originate from remote villages. In order to open their stalls, they borrow money from a patron, called a juragan; that amount can be up to Rp 900,000. From the daily net profits of Rp 15,000 – Rp 25,000, the seller repays the patron until the debt is repaid and the seller can operate independently.

== See also ==
- Nasi bogana
- Nasi campur
- Nasi goreng
- Nasi katok
- Nasi kuning
- Nasi liwet
- Nasi pecel
- Nasi uduk
- Nasi ulam

== Bibliography ==
- Erwin, Lily T.; Erwin, Abang (2008). Peta 100 Tempat Makan Makanan Khas Daerah di Jakarta, Bekasi, Depok, Tangerang [Map of 100 Eateries for Unique Local Foods in Jakarta, Bekasi, Depok, Tangerang] (in Indonesian). Jakarta: Gramedia Pustaka Utama. ISBN 9789792238372.
- Mundayat, Aris Arif (2005). Ritual and Politics in New Order Indonesia: A Study of Discourse and Counter-Discourse in Indonesia (Doctorate thesis). Swinburne University of Technology. Archived from the original on 4 October 2011.
- Suprihatin, Sri Emy Yuli (April 2002). "Hubungan Patron Klien Pedagang "Nasi Kucing" di Kota Yogyakarta" [Client-Patron Relationships of "Nasi Kucing" Sellers in the City of Yogyakarta] (PDF). Humaniora (in Indonesian). 7 (1): 147–164. Archived from the original (PDF) on 17 March 2012.
