= Nasi bogana =

Central Javanese rice dish

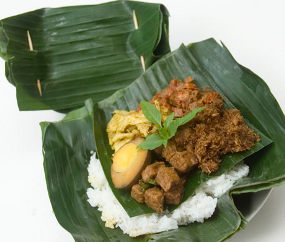
- Nasi bogana wrapped inside banana leaf
- Course: Main course
- Place of origin: Indonesia
- Region or state: Tegal, Central Java
- Serving temperature: Hot or room temperature
- Main ingredients: Rice with side dishes wrapped inside banana leaf

Nasi bogana or nasi begana, pronounced as nah-see boh-gâna, is an Indonesian-style rice dish, originally from Tegal, Central Java. It is usually wrapped in banana leaves and served with side dishes.

This rice dish is a type of nasi rames or nasi campur, terms used for dishes that include rice and are served with variety of side dishes.

Nasi bogana is a common street food in Indonesia and is sold in Jakarta for 12,000 to 20,000 rupiah each. It is sold in almost all Sundanese or Javanese restaurants and sometimes in warungs or wartegs (warung tegal), traditional outdoor restaurants or cafés. It is considered a convenient dish as it is wrapped in banana leaves and is usually ready to bring and eat at any time. It is a type of fast food that is brought to workplaces to eat.

== Preparation ==
Nasi bogana is prepared by spreading a wide banana leaf and filling it with steamed rice. Seasoning, such as fried shallots is placed on top of the rice. Over the rice, a smaller banana leaf is spread and the side dishes—opor ayam (white chicken curry), dendeng (shredded meat), fried chicken liver and gizzard in chili and coconut gravy, sambal of shredded red chili, telur pindang whole boiled eggs, serundeng (fried shredded spiced coconut with peanuts), sautéed tempeh or sautéed string beans—are decoratively placed. All ingredients are then wrapped and closed with the outer banana leaf that is placed over the rice. Plastic strings are used to tighten the pack together. It is put in a steamer to keep it warm and is ready to eat at any time.

== Preparation of side dishes ==
The opor ayam is usually served as pieces without their bones. This is usually done because they can wrap it in banana leaves more easily without taking up too much space. There are two types of opor ayam: white gravy, commonly used in West Java, and yellow gravy, commonly used in Central Java. Both are sweet but yellow opor ayam tends to have curry spices in it.

The dendeng is sometimes put on a stick and eaten the same way as a satay (meat in a skewer). The telur pindang boiled eggs are most of the time cut in half and only half is served. This depends on the occasion. Serundeng, fried chicken liver and gizzard in chili and coconut gravy (suggested to use cow livers rather than chicken to avoid the smell), sambal of shredded red chili and sautéed tempeh and sautéed string beans is served regularly, a spoon-full of each circling the steamed rice.

== Tradition and culture ==
In Java, nasi bogana is typically served on special occasions, such as weddings and anniversaries, but is most commonly found in family gatherings and social gatherings (arisan). At weddings, nasi bogana usually has its booth where people can choose their side dishes and sauces. Most people prefer nasi bogana to be eaten with kerupuk (Indonesian flour crackers) or emping (crushed bean crackers from melinjo), and as a result, it becomes a part of the side dish. Some people like additional sauces like kecap manis (sweet soybean sauce) and sambal terasi (fish and shrimp chili sauce). The drink that they have while having this dish is most of the time hot or iced black tea.

== Nutrition ==
Nasi bogana contains significant amounts of protein and carbohydrates from the meat and rice, in addition to fat and oil obtained from the coconut and palm oils used in the side dishes. Almost all of the side dishes are fried.

The dish ranges from 1000 to 1600 calories per serving. It is comparable to fast food.

== Other rice dishes ==
- Nasi campur
- Nasi gudeg
- Nasi jamblang
- Nasi Kapau
- Nasi kebuli
- Nasi krawu
- Nasi kuning
- Nasi langgi
- Nasi lemak
- Nasi liwet
- Nasi Megono
- Nasi Padang
- Nasi pecel
- Nasi timbel
- Nasi uduk
- Nasi ulam

== See also ==
- Cuisine of Indonesia
- List of Indonesian dishes
- Javanese cuisine
- Nasi campur
- Nasi lemak
