= Nasi pecel =

Indonesian rice and vegetable dish

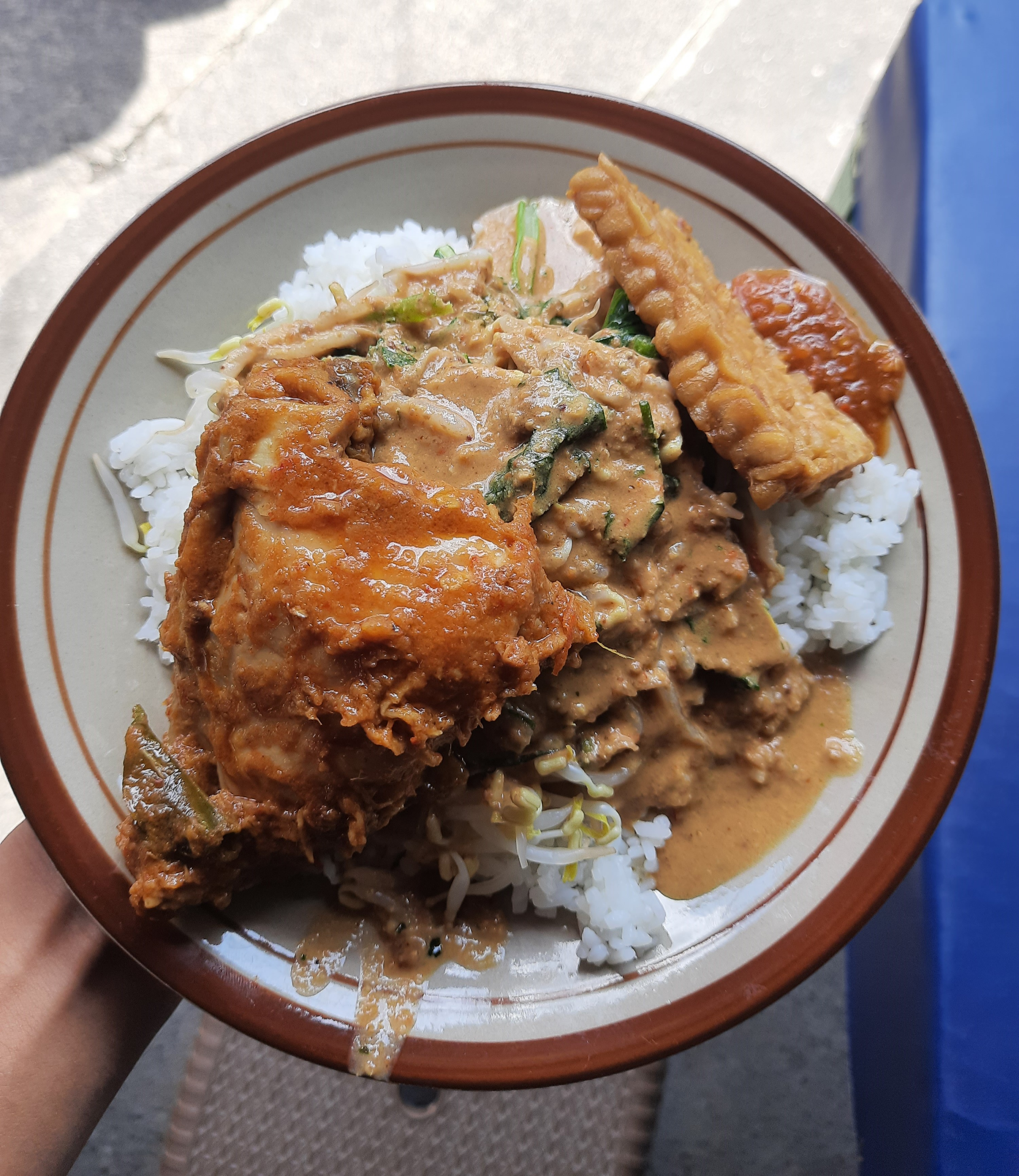
- Nasi pecel
- Course: Main course
- Place of origin: Indonesia
- Region or state: East Java, Central Java, Yogyakarta
- Serving temperature: Room temperature
- Main ingredients: Rice with vegetables in peanut sauce

Nasi pecel also known as Sega pecel in Javanese is an Indonesian rice dish from Java served with pecel (cooked vegetables and peanut sauce). The vegetables are usually kangkung or water spinach, long beans, cassava leaves, papaya leaves, and in East Java often used the flower of kembang turi. It is often eaten with fried tempeh and traditional crackers called peyek. It is popular in East and Central Java.

== See also ==
- Nasi bogana
- Nasi campur
- Nasi goreng
- Nasi kucing
- Nasi kuning
- Nasi lemak
- Nasi uduk
- Nasi ulam
- List of Indonesian dishes
