= Nasi liwet =

Central Javanese rice dish

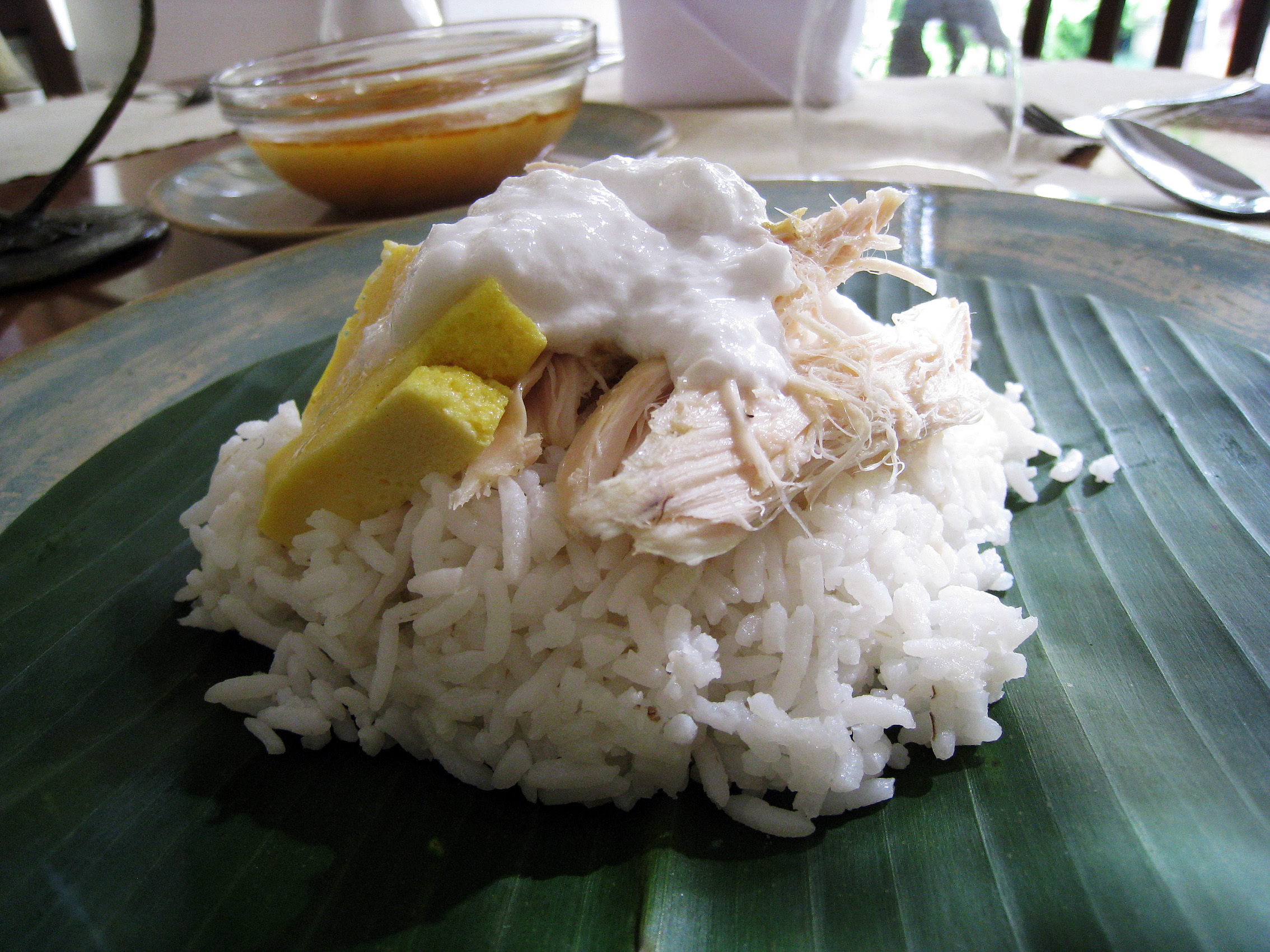
- Nasi liwet rice dish in rich coconut milk, chicken and egg.
- Course: Main course
- Place of origin: Indonesia
- Region or state: Surakarta, Central Java
- Created by: Central Javanese
- Serving temperature: Hot
- Main ingredients: Rice cooked in rich coconut milk surrounded with side dishes

Nasi liwet is a Central Javanese rice dish cooked in coconut milk, added with chicken broth, salam leaves, lemongrass, and spices, from Solo, Central Java, Indonesia. Thus, the rice has a rich, aromatic, and succulent taste.

== Background ==
The uniqueness of nasi liwet is that it applies a traditional Javanese way of cooking rice in coconut milk. Another popular variant of the dish is the Sundanese style of nasi liwet from West Java. It is a unique Sundanese cuisine with different taste and presentation, from the Sundanese eating tradition called ngeliwet or botram (a dish made with banana leaves and eaten together).

== Serving ==
Nasi liwet is topped with a few small slices of omelette, shredded chicken that has been cooked in coconut milk, and a spoonful of a thick aromatic coconut cream called kumut. Served alongside nasi liwet is opor ayam (a delicate chicken in a mild white coconut milk-based sauce scented with galangal and lime leaves), telur pindang (eggs boiled slowly with spices), tempeh, and labu siam (chayote) as the vegetable.

Traditionally, the pan used for cooking was made of clay. The taste and aroma are generally better if it is cooked on a wood fire, but different regions have different ways of preparing it. Traditionally, it is served on a banana leaf or teak leaf. Frequently, people prefer teak leaves to plates because of the natural fragrance of the leaf. Nasi liwet complements (side dishes) always consist of coconut milk.

== Popularity and variants ==
In Solo, nasi liwet is usually eaten for breakfast, but is also a popular choice for lunch or supper. In the Keprabon subdistrict Surakarta, nasi liwet is only served for supper at nighttime. Similar rice-coconut milk dishes can be found in other parts of Indonesia, such as nasi uduk from Betawi cuisine, nasi gurih from Acehnese cuisine, and nasi lemak from Malay cuisine.

== See also ==
- Nasi bogana
- Nasi campur
- Nasi goreng
- Nasi kucing
- Nasi kuning
- Nasi pecel
- Nasi uduk
- Nasi ulam
- Nasi lemak
- Oyakodon
