= Dendeng =

West Sumatran (Minangkabau) meat dish

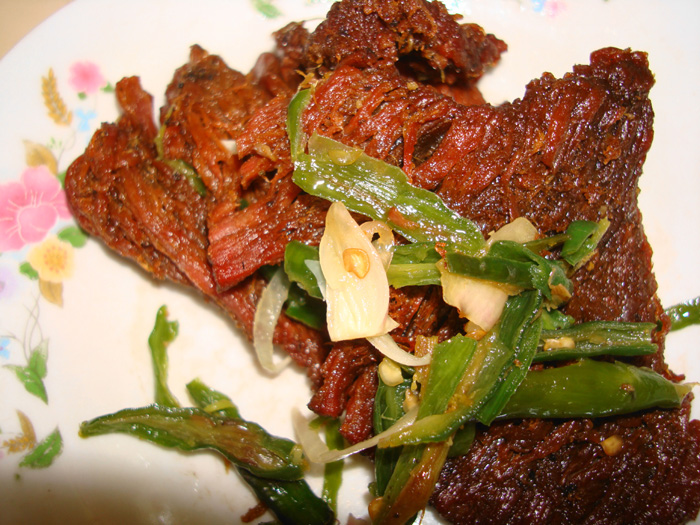
- Dendeng batokok
- Course: Main course
- Place of origin: Indonesia
- Region or state: West Sumatra
- Created by: Minangkabau
- Serving temperature: Hot or room temperature
- Main ingredients: Meat, spices

Dendeng is thinly sliced dried meat in Minangkabau cuisine. It is preserved through a mixture of sugar and spices and dried via a frying process. It is similar to jerky. Dendeng is traditionally produced by using some spices and sugar at various levels. Therefore, its flavour is sweet and spicy. It is also stable for several weeks at room temperature.

== History ==
The creation of dendeng is commonly credited to the Minangkabau people, in which their earliest dendeng was made from dried beef, so that it would be preserved for days and could be taken along with them when they traveled. The Padang cuisine version—probably the most popular dendeng dish in Indonesia—is called dendeng balado or dendeng batokok. It is a specialty from Padang, West Sumatra and is made from thinly cut beef which is dried and fried before adding chillies and other ingredients.

== Variations ==
The most common version of dendeng found in Indonesia is dendeng sapi (beef dendeng), and it usually has a sweetness from the inclusion of caramelized coconut sugar. However, versions made from other exotic meats are also available, especially in Eastern Indonesia. Dendeng rusa (deer dendeng) can be found in the Nusa Tenggara islands and Papua. Indonesian Chinese favor the similar dried pork dish known as bakkwa.

Cocos Malays have been observed preserving many types of fish like jacks and barracudas this way, a similar method is found among the Filipinos called daing.

== See also ==
- Padang cuisine
- Rendang
- Daing
