= Nasi uduk =

Javan coconut rice dish

Nasi uduk ꦤꦱꦶꦮꦸꦢꦸꦏ꧀
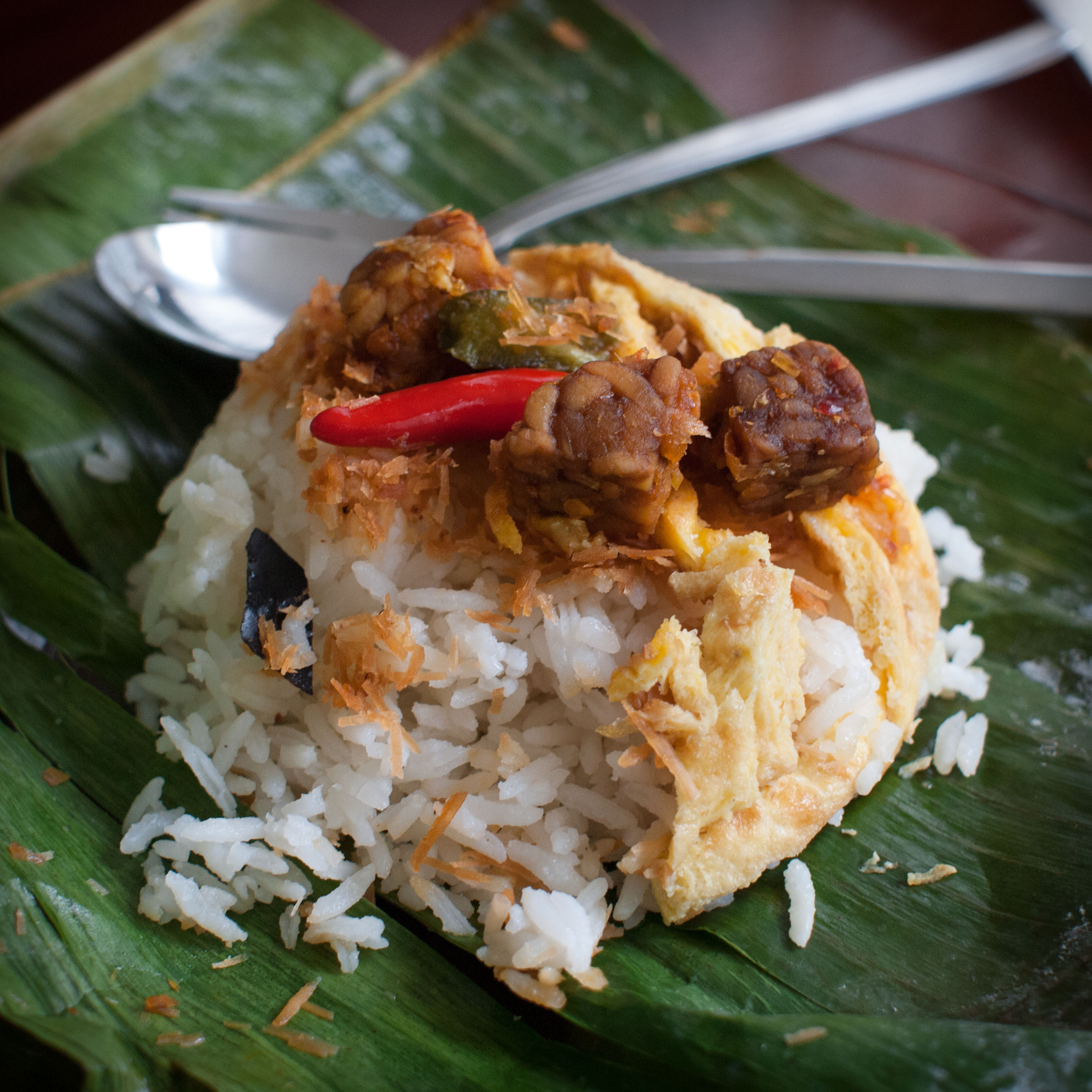
- A basic nasi uduk from a shop in the Netherlands
- Course: Main course
- Place of origin: Indonesia
- Region or state: Greater Jakarta, Java
- Created by: Javanese
- Serving temperature: Hot or room temperature
- Main ingredients: Rice cooked in coconut milk and spices with side dishes

Nasi uduk (from Javanese nasi wuduk; Javanese script: ꦤꦱꦶꦮꦸꦢꦸꦏ꧀) is an Indonesian-style steamed rice cooked in coconut milk dish, especially popular in Betawi and Javanese culinary traditions.

== Etymology ==
The Kamus Besar Bahasa Indonesia describes nasi uduk as rice cooked with coconut milk and seasoned with spices.

According to the book Kuliner Betawi Selaksa Rasa & Cerita (2016) written by Akademi Kuliner Indonesia, the term uduk etymology derived from the term that means "difficult" or "struggle", which suggested that this rice dish was originally consumed by farmers and hard labourers.

Another theory suggests that the term uduk is related to the term aduk which means "mix", thus nasi uduk means "mixed rice".

On the other hand, some people connected the etymology to the Javanese traditions. Sultan Agung of Mataram called this rice dish wuduk, from the Arabic word tawadhu' which means being humble before God. Depending on the dialect used, it can be referred to as uduk or wuduk in Javanese. When a reference to its taste is made, it's called sega gurih (lit. savory rice).

== History ==
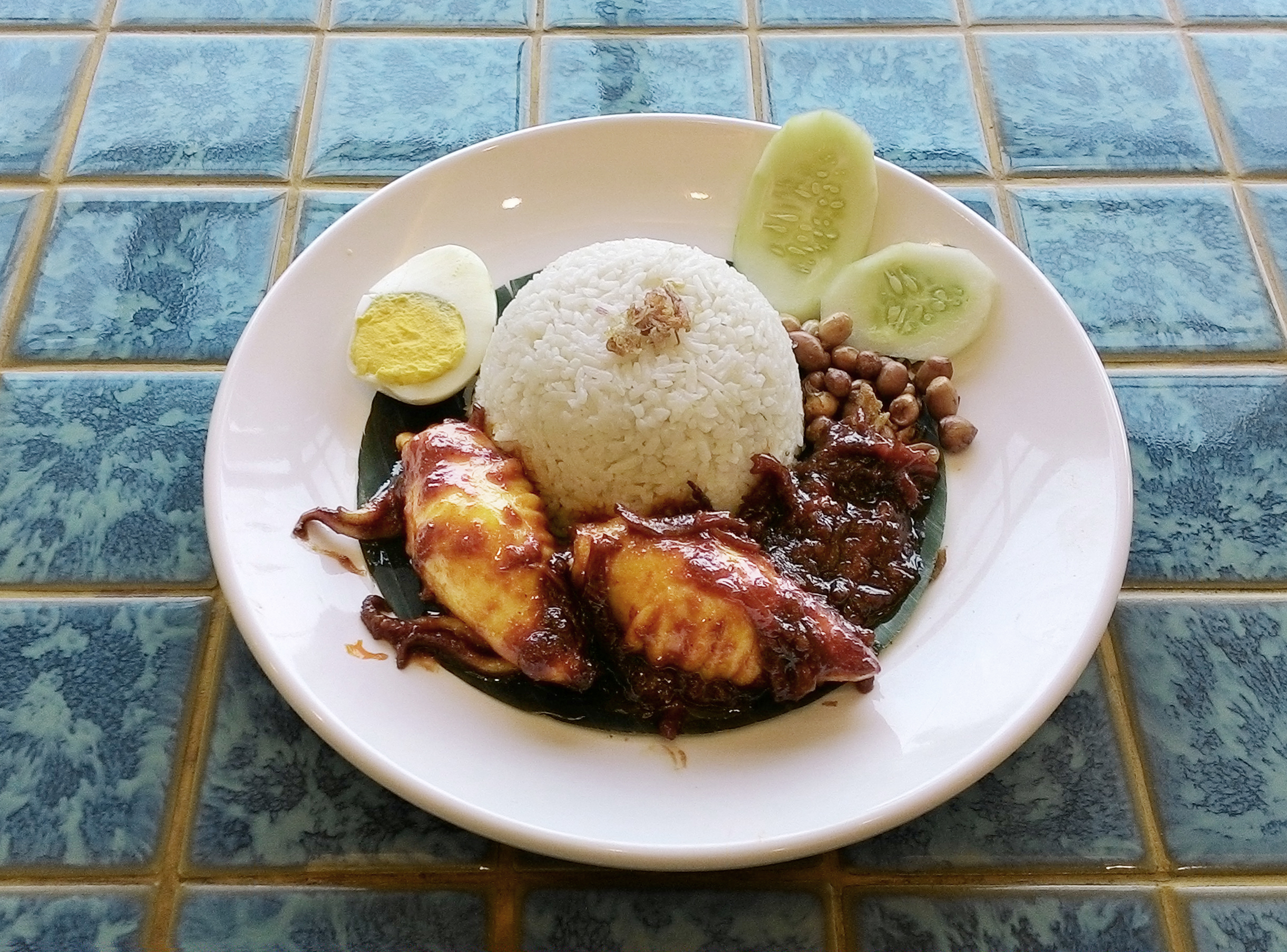
Nasi lemak, a similar dish of Malay origin common in the Malay peninsula and Sumatra

According to the book Makanan Khas Betawi (2018) by Lilly T. Erwin, nasi uduk is a Betawi food that is quite popular and easy to find in almost all corners of Jakarta. Despite its current popularity in the Jakarta area, historians suggest that the origin of this rice dish can be traced to the influence of two culinary traditions: Malay and Javanese.

According to historians, there were historic trade and migration links connecting the port of Malacca and the port of Batavia, thus Malay traders and immigrants frequently visited Batavia, thus they brought the nasi lemak cooking tradition into Batavia. Plus, there were Javanese settlers in Batavia who were also familiar with cooking coconut rice. Moreover, after the fall of Portuguese Malacca to the Dutch in 1641, the link between the two port cities was enforced tremendously since finally, both belonged to the Dutch empire. The trace of the Malay people's migration from the Malay Peninsula and Sumatra into Batavia can be seen in the historic name of the Kampung Melayu area in East Jakarta.

On the other hand, some historians suggested that nasi uduk was originated from Java. It was the brainchild of Sultan Agung of Mataram, a Javanese ruler, inspired by his experience consuming kebuli rice. According to Babad Tanah Jawi, Mataram sultans loved to eat "Arabic rice", which may refer to different types of pilaf or Arab-style rice. The phrase is often translated to kebuli (popular among Arabic descent in Indonesia) or biryani (an Indian Muslim dish) as these two dishes are the most commonly known among Javanese Muslims. Sultan Agung decided to create a local version of this "Arab dish" using local ingredients, partly to reduce the imported ingredients required to make that dish. Nasi uduk is mentioned in early 19th century Javanese literature Serat Centhini as sega wuduk.

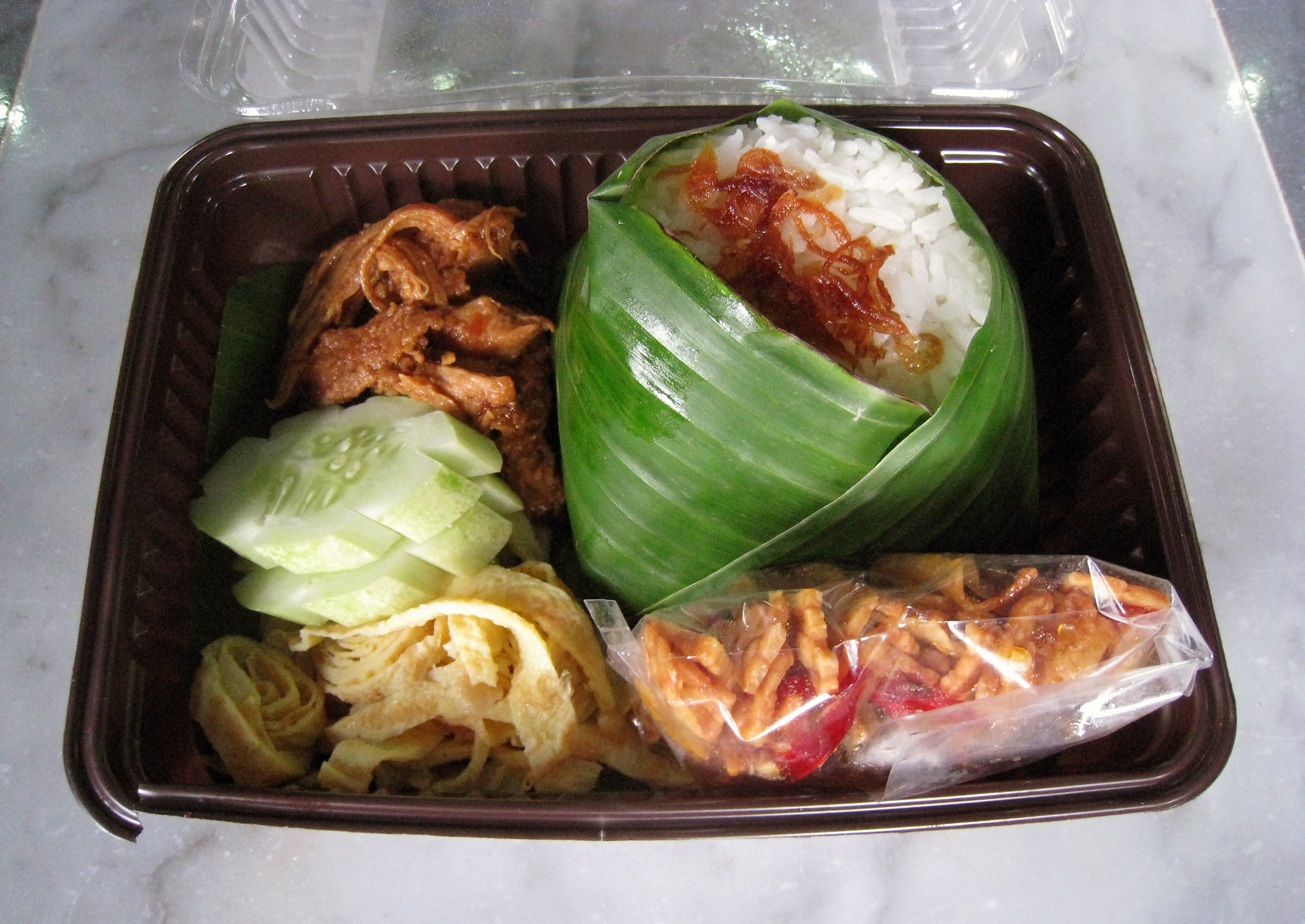
Packed nasi uduk with ayam suwir (shredded chicken), slices of cucumber, shredded omelette, and kering tempe (crispy deep-fried tempeh with sweet soy sauce)

Soon, sega uduk became a part of syarat (mandatory dish) in Javanese syukuran or "gratitude" ceremonies, often called banca'an (alternative spelling: bancakan) or slametan. Sega uduk can be found in a berkat, a food package (usually contains rice, veggies, and side dishes), or served as a tumpeng, to be distributed after the ceremony. Sega uduk also becomes a required dish to be served during Wiwitan, a Javanese pre-harvest ritual.

Uduk was introduced to Batavia by Javanese migrants in 1628, and later became popular dish in this region. Betawi people who sell this dish will often add a Betawi touch by adding semur jengkol. Uduk is also popular among Javanese diasporas in Suriname and the Netherlands.

Nasi uduk is made by cooking rice soaked in coconut milk instead of water, along with clove, cassia bark, and lemongrass to add aroma. Sometimes knotted pandan leaves are thrown into the rice while steaming to enhance the fragrance. The coconut milk and spices infused an oily, rich flavour to the rice. Bawang goreng (fried shallots) is sprinkled on top of the rice before serving. Other dishes are usually served as side dishes.

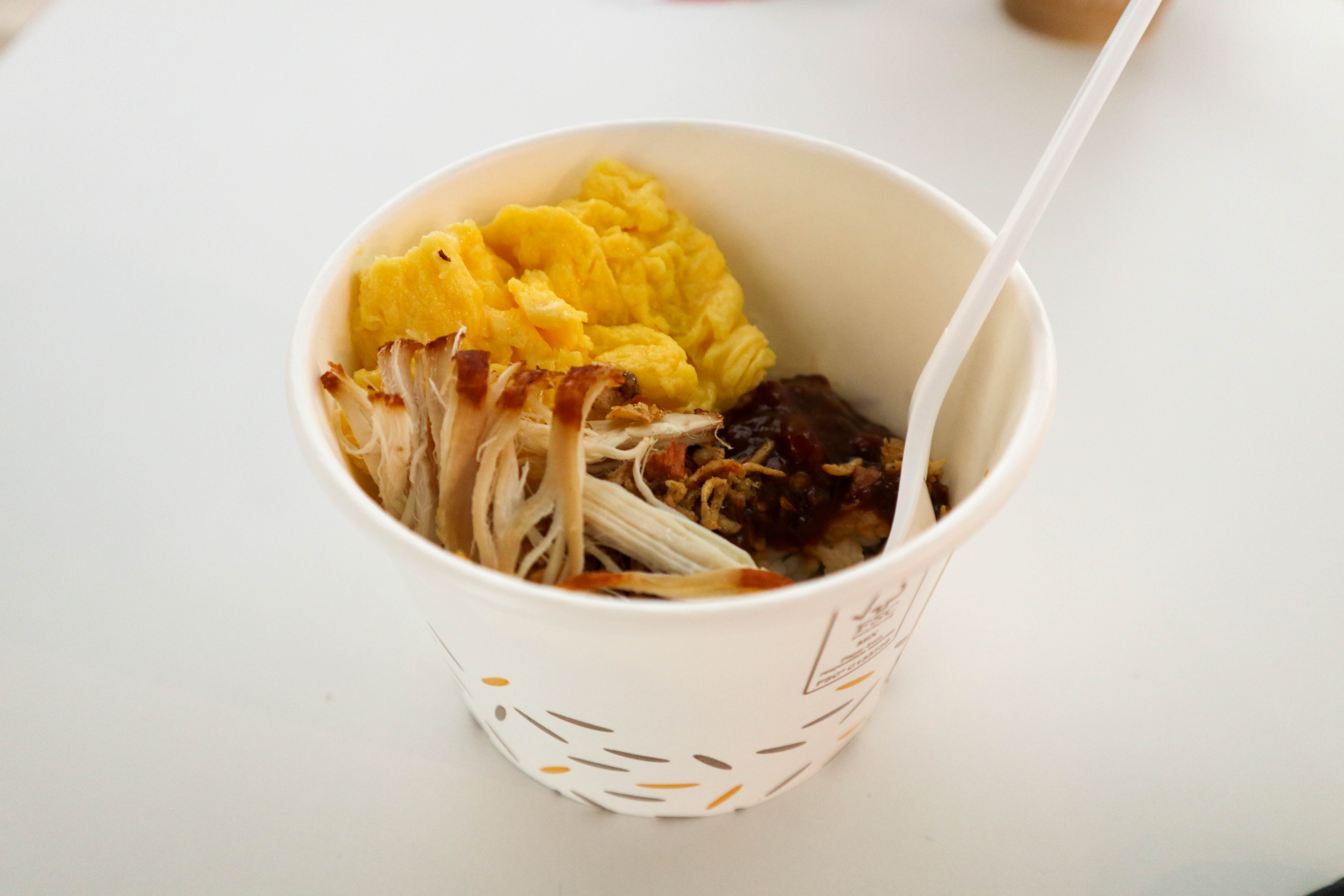
McDonald's nasi uduk served in Indonesia

Depending on the occasion, uduk can be served "berkat style" in a woven bamboo box, wrapped in teak or banana leaves, or served as a large cone on a tampah (a rounded bamboo platter) as a tumpeng.

Recently, nasi uduk is also offered in McDonald's fast food chains in Indonesia. It is coconut rice served with sambal terasi, scrambled egg, bawang goreng (fried shallot), and completed with shredded fried chicken.

== Side dishes ==
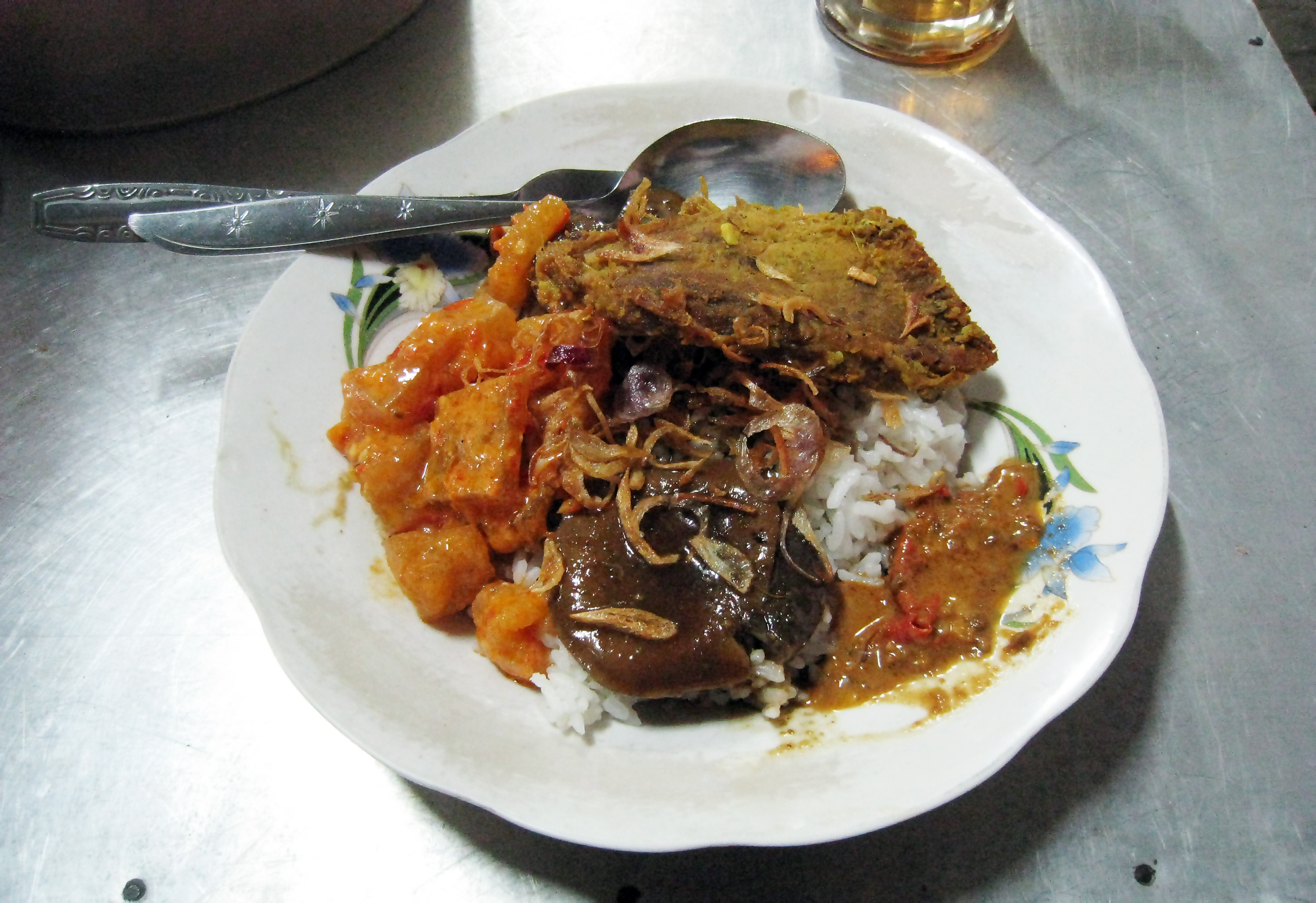
Nasi uduk with empal fried beef, semur jengkol, krechek (beef rind in spicy coconut milk), and sambal kacang

For certain rituals or ceremonies, uduk is usually served with traditional Javanese dishes like kering tempe, urap vegetables, and sambel goreng (kentang/potato, krechek/cow's skin, teri/anchovy, etc.). Humble protein sources, such as a hard-boiled egg, fried tempeh, or fried tofu, can also be included in the package.

In today's slametan, modern Indonesian food dishes (or from other regions), such as sliced fried egg, telur bumbu Bali (Balinese style egg), beef either as empal (sweet fried beef) or rendang, may also be included. Some people may also add bihun goreng (rice vermicelli) or mie goreng (noodle) to the dish. Krupuk, rempeyek, or emping can also be added.

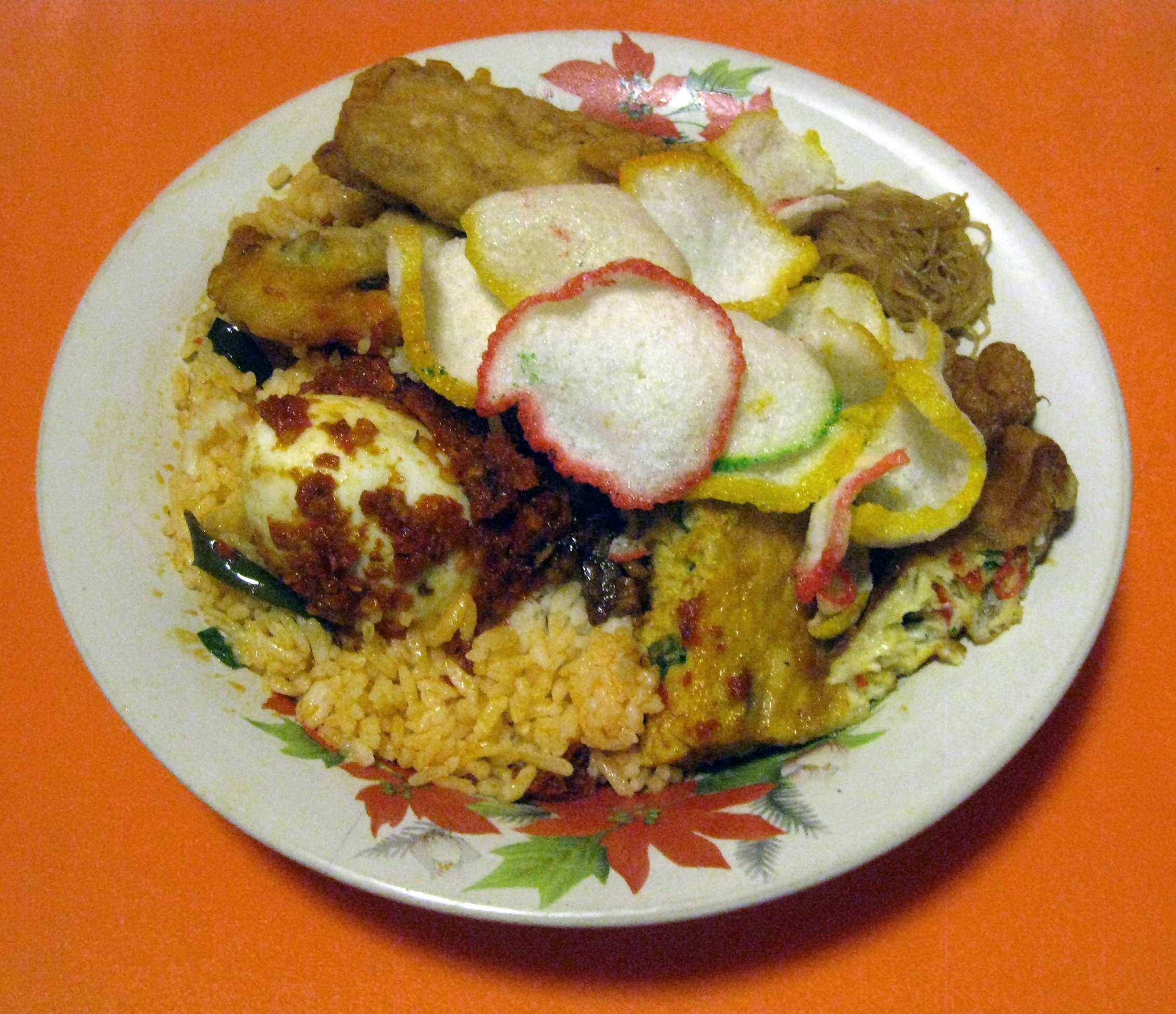
Traditional Betawi nasi uduk, mixing all the side dishes on the nasi uduk plate, such as egg, tempeh, sambal, bihun goreng, and krupuk

Jakarta's style uduk is a cross between Javanese's uduk and Melayu's nasi lemak. It may include jengkol (brown stinky beans) as a Betawi touch, and some elements of nasi lemak, such as teri-kacang, similar to ikan bilis and peanuts in nasi lemak, which is also slightly similar to Javanese sambel goreng teri, except that it is not spicy.

Sambal may be used in a commercial uduk, but it is not a prerequisite for a ritual or ceremonial uduk. In general, any type of sambal can be used as a condiment. Jakarta's style nasi uduk call for sambal kacang, which is hot chili pepper paste mixed with ground peanuts.

== Nasi uduk in Jakarta ==
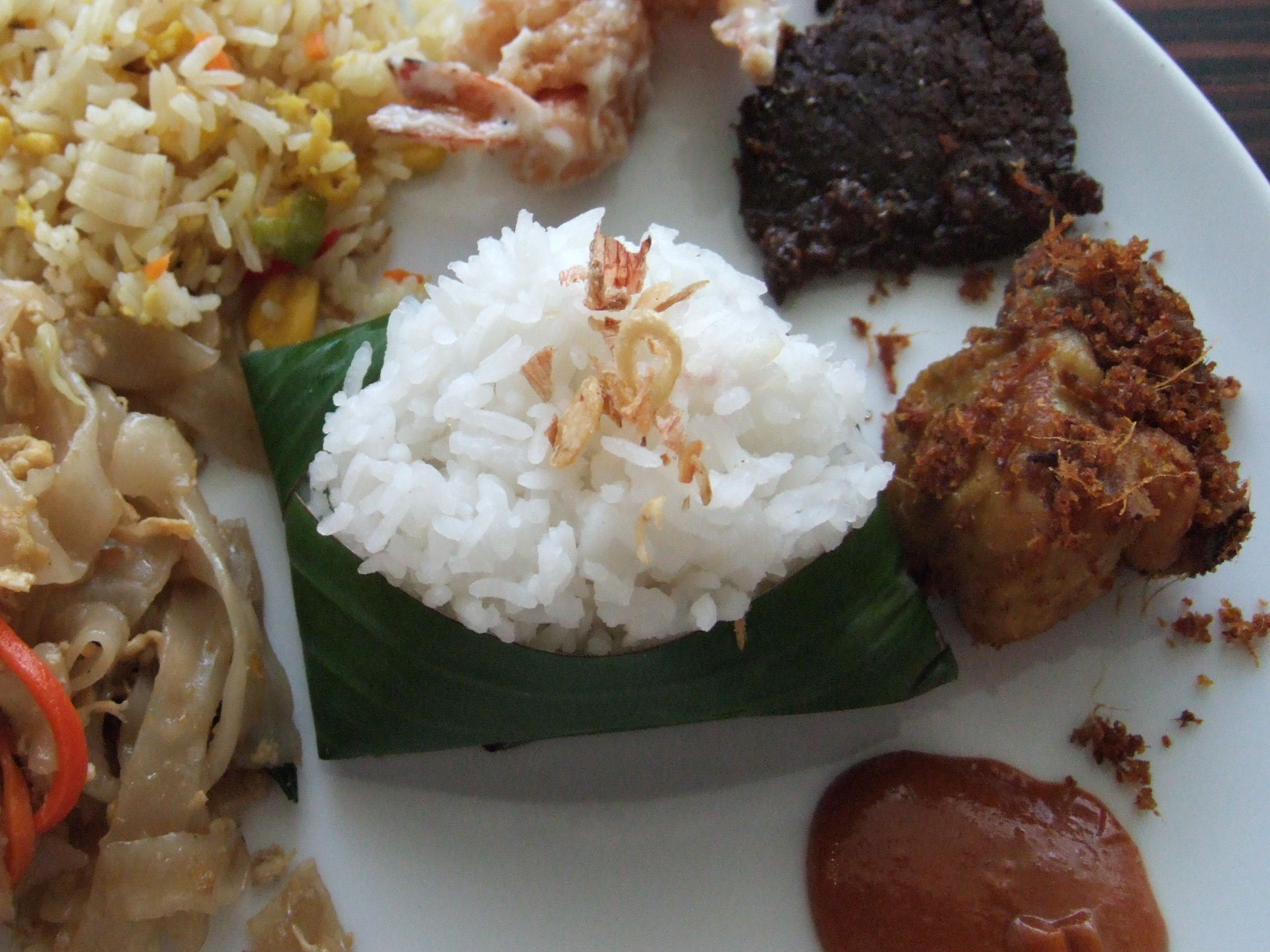
Nasi uduk served in Kebon Kacang style: a small amount of nasi uduk wrapped in banana leaf

Nasi uduk is common breakfast fare in Jakarta kampungs or urban residential areas. In most pasar pagi traditional markets in Jakarta and surrounding areas, nasi uduk vendors can be easily spotted selling their breakfast offering every morning. Each neighbourhood in Jakarta has its variant of the dish, such as nasi uduk slipi from West Jakarta. The Kebon Kacang area near Tanah Abang in Central Jakarta is known for its nasi uduk. Nasi uduk served in Kebon Kacang style usually consists of a small amount of nasi uduk wrapped in banana leaf, consumed with a variety of side dishes. A single portion of nasi uduk Kebon Kacang style is usually quite small, thus two or multiple wraps of banana leaf nasi uduk are required to be a fulfilling meal.

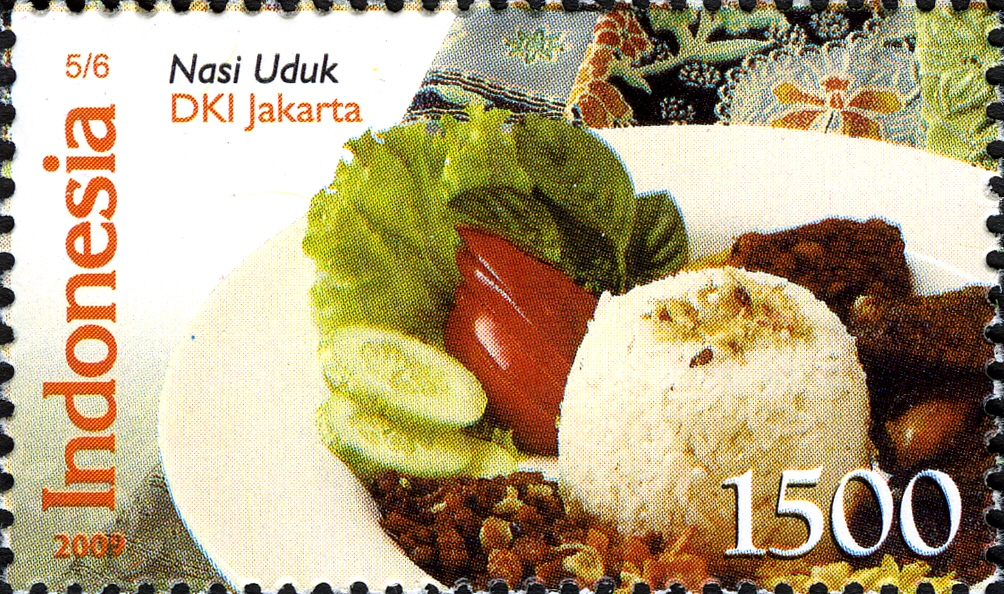
Nasi uduk depicted on an Indonesian stamp as a dish from Jakarta

Nasi uduk is a popular dish for busy commuters in Jakarta, mainly because it is affordable (one serving costs an average Rp10,000 or about US$0.77). It can be found throughout the day; some roadside stalls open exclusively in the morning, noon, or night, depending on the demographics of the surrounding area. Stalls near residential areas, marketplaces, train stations, and schools are usually open from morning to noon, while the ones near offices and street-side are usually open from afternoon to midnight.

== See also ==
- List of rice dishes
- Nasi bogana
- Nasi campur
- Nasi gemuk
- Nasi goreng
- Nasi gurih
- Nasi kebuli
- Nasi kucing
- Nasi kuning
- Nasi lemak
- Nasi liwet
- Nasi pecel
- Nasi ulam
