= Nasi lemak =

Traditional Malay breakfast dish

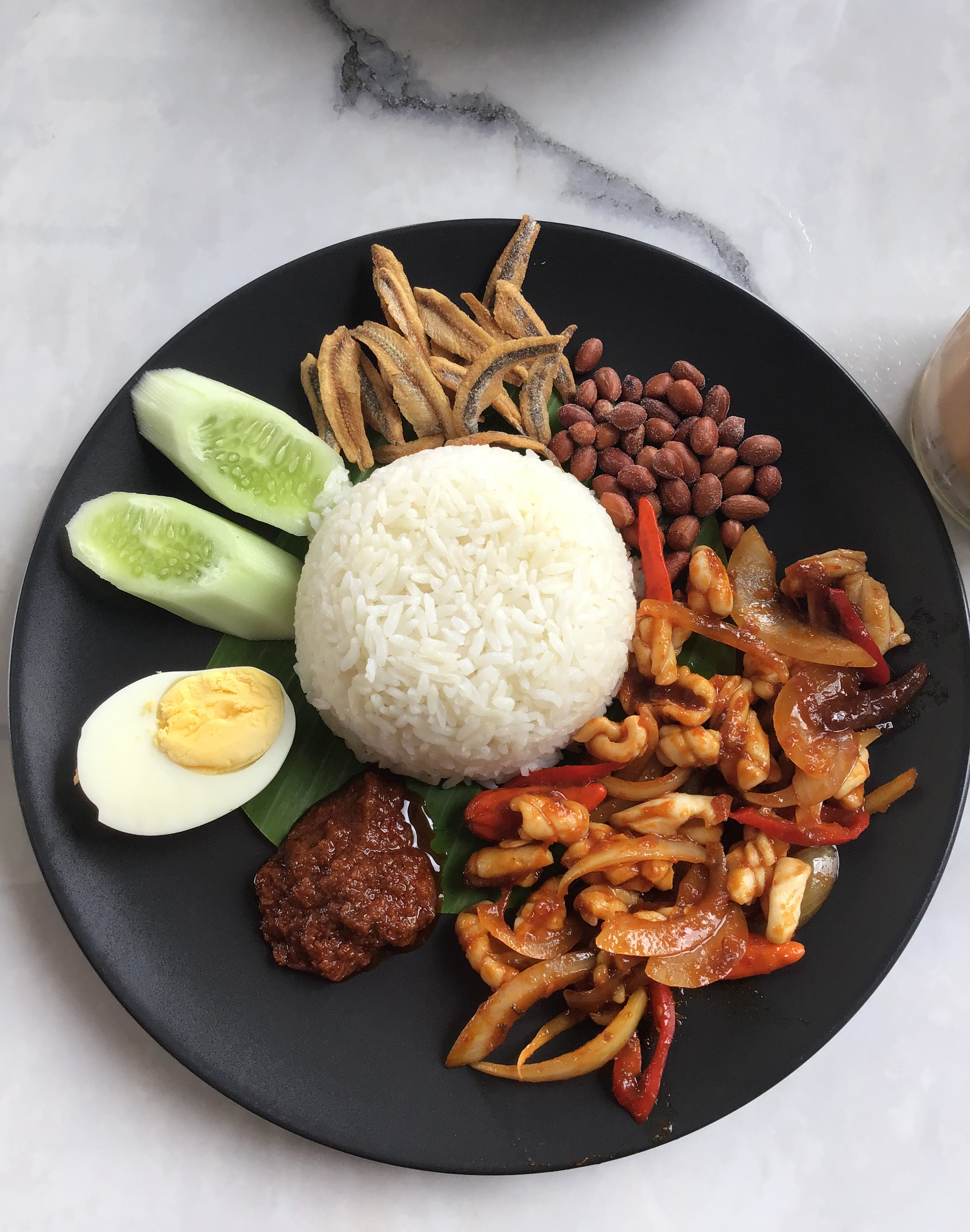
- Nasi lemak with spicy squid, sambal chilli paste, boiled egg, slices of cucumber, anchovies, and peanuts, served at a restaurant in Penang
- Course: Main course, usually for breakfast
- Place of origin: Malaysia
- Region or state: Peninsular Malaysia, certain parts of Sumatra (Medan, Riau, Riau Islands, and Palembang), Singapore, Brunei, southern Philippines, Southern Thailand, Cocos (Keeling) Islands, and Christmas Island
- Serving temperature: Hot or room-temperature
- Main ingredients: Rice cooked in coconut milk with pandan leaves
- Ingredients generally used: Served with sambal, anchovies, cucumber, and various side dishes
- Variations: Nasi lemak (standard), nasi lemak halba (Johor), nasi lemak kuning (Kedah), nasi lemak sambal tongkol (Terengganu), nasi lemak tumpang (Kelantan)
- Food energy (per serving): 352 kcal (1,470 kJ)

Breakfast culture in Malaysia: dining experience in a multi-ethnic society
- UNESCO Intangible Cultural Heritage
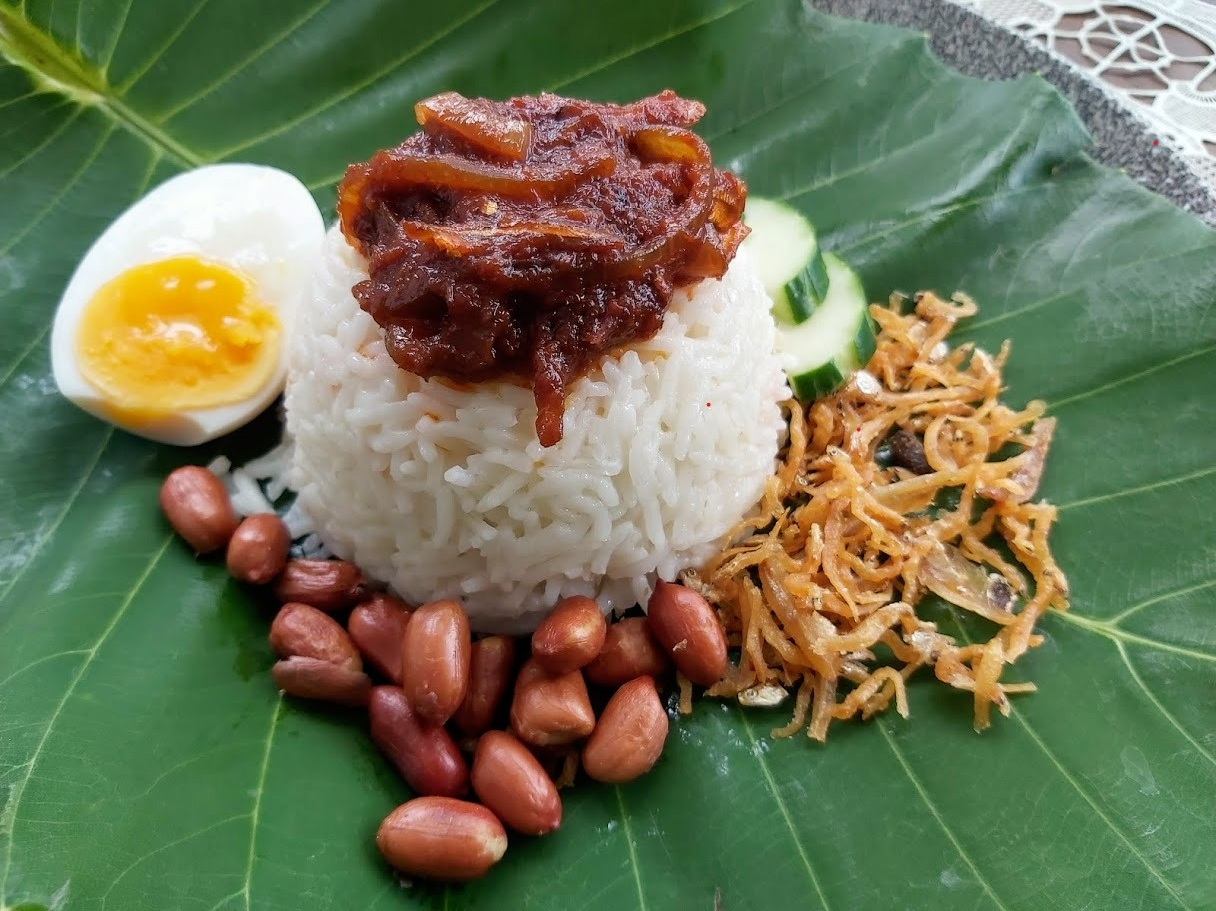
- Nasi lemak is traditionally wrapped in leaves
- Country: Malaysia
- Reference: 02113
- Region: Asia and the Pacific

Inscription history
- Inscription: 2024 (19th session)
- List: Representative

Nasi lemak (Jawi: ناسي لمق; Malay pronunciation: [ˌnasi ləˈmaʔ]; lit. 'fatty rice') is a dish originating in Malay cuisine that consists of rice cooked in coconut milk and pandan leaf. It is commonly found in Malaysia, where it is considered the national dish. As it is common throughout the Malay world, it is also a native dish in neighbouring areas with significant ethnic Malay populations, such as Singapore and Southern Thailand. In Indonesia, it can be found in parts of Sumatra, especially the Malay regions of Riau, Riau Islands, and Medan. Nasi lemak can also be found in the Philippines as well as in Australia's external territories of Christmas Island and Cocos (Keeling) Islands.

It is considered an essential dish for a typical Malay-style breakfast, and it has been recognised by the National Heritage Department of Malaysia. It was nominated to the UNESCO Intangible Cultural Heritage List in 2024 by Malaysia, where it was subsequently listed.

== History and background ==
Nasi lemak was mentioned as early as 1875 in a French–Malay dictionary compiled by Pierre-Étienne-Lazare Favre, a Roman Catholic missionary based on the Malay Peninsula, and in a book titled The Circumstances of Malay Life, written by Richard Olaf Winstedt in 1909. One legend tells the story of a young girl named Seri in Malacca who accidentally spilled coconut milk into rice while she was cooking for her mother. When the latter asked her what she was preparing, the daughter replied, "Nasi le, mak" ("just rice, Mom"). With roots in Malay culture and cuisine, the name of the dish in Malay literally means "fat rice" but is taken in this context to mean "rich" or "creamy". This refers to the cooking process, which involves soaking the rice in coconut milk and steaming the mixture. The addition of pandan leaves gives the rice its distinct flavour. Traditionally, nasi lemak is wrapped and served in banana leaves, together with a hot spicy sauce (sambal) and various garnishes, including fresh cucumber slices, fried anchovies (ikan bilis), roasted peanuts, and hard-boiled or fried eggs.

As a more substantial meal, nasi lemak may also be served with an additional protein dish such as ayam goreng (fried chicken), sambal sotong (cuttlefish in chilli), small fried fish, cockles, and rendang daging (beef stewed in coconut milk and spices). Other accompaniments include stir-fried water convolvulus and spicy pickled vegetable salad (acar). Nasi lemak is widely eaten in Malaysia and Singapore as breakfast and is sold in hawker centres and roadside stalls. In Indonesia, it is also common breakfast fare, especially in Sumatra (Riau Islands, Riau, and Medan). In the Palembang and Jambi provinces, it is called nasi gemuk, since in Palembang Malay, gemuk is a synonym of lemak. In January 2019, Google released a Google Doodle celebrating nasi lemak. In 2024, Malaysia nominated the dish, along with roti canai and teh tarik, for United Nations recognition as intangible cultural heritage foods and beverages, where it was subsequently listed.

== Variations ==
In Malaysia and Singapore, nasi lemak comes in many variations, as it is prepared by different chefs from different cultures. In northwestern Peninsular Malaysia, nasi lemak dishes typically incorporate curry into their recipe. The sambal served with the dish varies in spiciness, ranging from mild to very spicy. Hawker centres usually wrap the dish in banana leaves to enhance its flavour. Roadside stalls sell it ready-packed, known as nasi lemak bungkus, with prices as low as RM2.00 ($0.49 USD).

=== Malaysia ===
==== Traditional Malaysian version ====
A traditional Malaysian nasi lemak calls for rice and a serving of sambal, anchovies, peanuts, and boiled egg. While the dish is typically made using white rice, brown rice can also be used. Cooked with fresh coconut milk, with pandan leaves thrown in, the dish is served on banana leaves.

==== Alor Setar variant ====
Also known as nasi lemak kuning ("yellow nasi lemak"), or nasi lemak royale, this version is prevalent around parts of northern Kedah, especially in Alor Setar, as well as in the state of Perlis. The rice is yellow in colour and commonly eaten with curries. As both variations of nasi lemak are widely available in northern Kedah and Perlis, locals commonly refer to the traditional dish as nasi lemak daun pisang ("banana leaf nasi lemak").

==== Terengganu variant ====
In the east-coast state of Terengganu, ikan aye/aya/tongkol ("mackerel tuna") is often added to the dish.

==== Malacca variant ====
In Malacca, kangkung is usually served together with nasi lemak, a contrast from the cucumber that is commonly used in the standard version of the dish.

==== Malaysian Chinese variant ====
Although it is not common to see Chinese stalls and restaurants selling nasi lemak, there is a non-halal version that contains pork, sold in towns and cities such as Malacca, Penang, Perak, and certain parts of Kuala Lumpur.

==== Malaysian Indian variant ====
The Malaysian Indian variation is similar to the original one. As many Malaysian Indians are Hindus, however, and thus do not eat beef, their variant of nasi lemak is often served with chicken curry, fish curry, or lamb curry, as well as with dishes like chicken masala or chicken varuval.

==== Vegetarian variant ====
In certain parts of Malaysia and Singapore, hawkers and restaurants may offer vegetarian nasi lemak. In this version, the dried anchovies and the shrimp paste for sambal are replaced with vegetarian substitutes. The dish can also be served with stir-fried vegetables and plant-based imitation fish or meat.

==== Strawberry variant ====
This variant is usually regarded as a unique Cameron Highlands speciality, where strawberries are commercially grown. The fruit is added to the sambal, and the rice is coloured dark pink.

=== Singapore ===
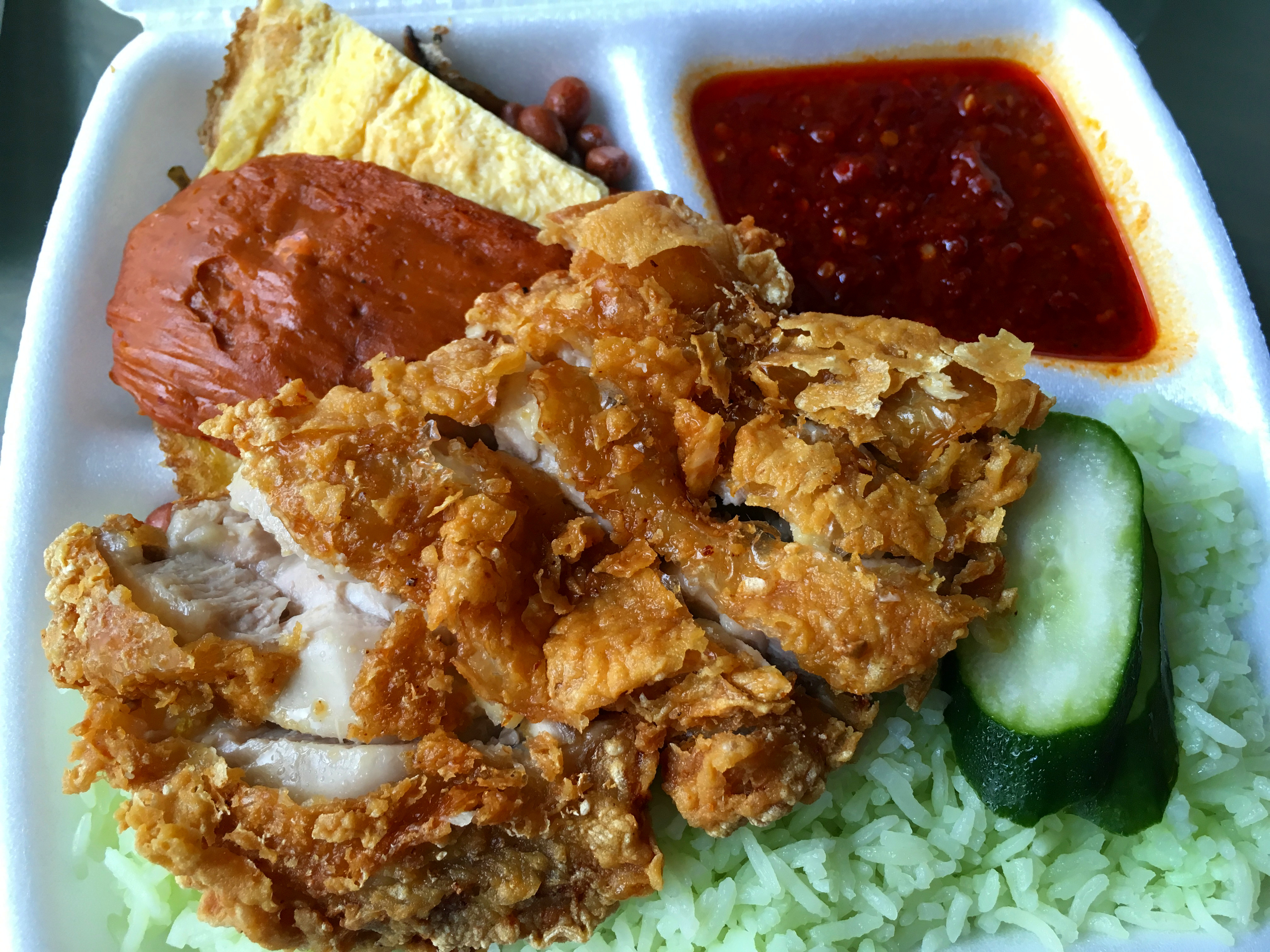
Nasi lemak in Singapore, served with chicken cutlet, sambal ikan bilis (anchovy sambal), peanuts, salted anchovies, egg, and otah

==== Singaporean variant ====
Retaining the familiar aroma of pandan leaves, the Singaporean variation of nasi lemak comes with a variety of sides that include deep-fried chicken drumsticks, chicken franks, fish cake, curried vegetables, and tongsan luncheon meat.

=== Indonesia ===
Across the Malacca Strait, the Malay Indonesians of the Sumatran east coast share a common heritage and cuisine with their Malaysian counterparts. As a result, nasi lemak is also native to the provinces of Riau Islands and Riau.

==== Riau Islands variant ====
In the Riau Archipelago, nasi lemak is considered a native Malay dish as well as a favourite breakfast food. Being an archipelagic region, seafood is usually added to the dish, including ikan tamban, ikan selar kuning, sotong (cuttlefish), cumi-cumi (squid), or shrimp.

==== Riau variant ====
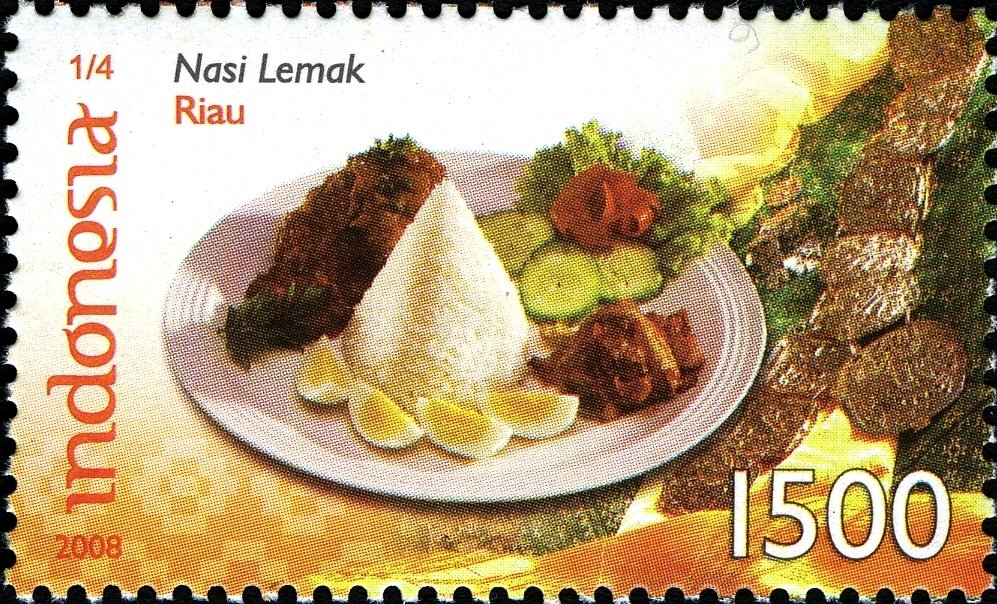
An Indonesian stamp depicting nasi lemak as a local dish of Riau province

In Pekanbaru, locally caught freshwater river fishes are commonly used to accompany nasi lemak. These include ikan selais, ikan patin, and ikan lomek. The fish are usually cooked in Minang-style lado ijo (green chilli pepper), minced and fried as perkedel ikan, or just plain fried.

Other than fried fish, Pekanbaru's nasi lemak might also be served with fried tempeh, beef prepared as gulai or rendang, with the addition of stir-fried long beans, often cooked in spicy coconut milk.

==== Medan variant ====
The Medan Melayu Deli version of nasi lemak is usually served with a choice of side dishes, either rendang (beef or chicken) or balado (egg or shrimp in chilli sauce). It may additionally include a sprinkle of crispy fried shallot, slices of omelette, kripik kentang balado (spicy potato chips), tempe orek (seasoned fried tempeh), perkedel (fried potato patties), sambal, and slightly bitter emping crackers.

Next to rendang and balado, the vegetable dish sayur masak lemak (vegetables including long beans, cabbage, and long green chillies in coconut milk) is also offered. It is a popular street food in Medan, sold in small warung, usually together with lontong Medan.

== Similar dishes ==
Nasi lemak's closest analogue is probably the Sumatran nasi gemuk (lit. "fatty rice"), commonly found in the Indonesian cities of Jambi and Palembang. The two dishes are essentially the same.

Other, similar regional dishes that use rice cooked in coconut milk include nasi uduk from Jakarta, nasi gurih from Aceh, and the Javanese nasi liwet. Nasi lemuni is a similar savoury rice dish traditionally found in northern Peninsular Malaysia. Its preparation is similar to that of nasi lemak, though the inclusion of lemuni leaf makes it distinctive. Nasi katok is another similar dish, this one from Brunei, which uses plain white rice rather than coconut rice.

== Preparation ==
The ingredients for cooking traditional nasi lemak can easily be found in and around traditional Malay villages. This includes anchovies that have been deep-fried, peanuts that have been fried, cucumber slices, egg wedges that have been hard-boiled, and the red chilli condiment known as sambal, either spicy or non-spicy. The traditional method of preparation has been passed down through generations to ensure its consistency and unique taste.

== Gallery ==
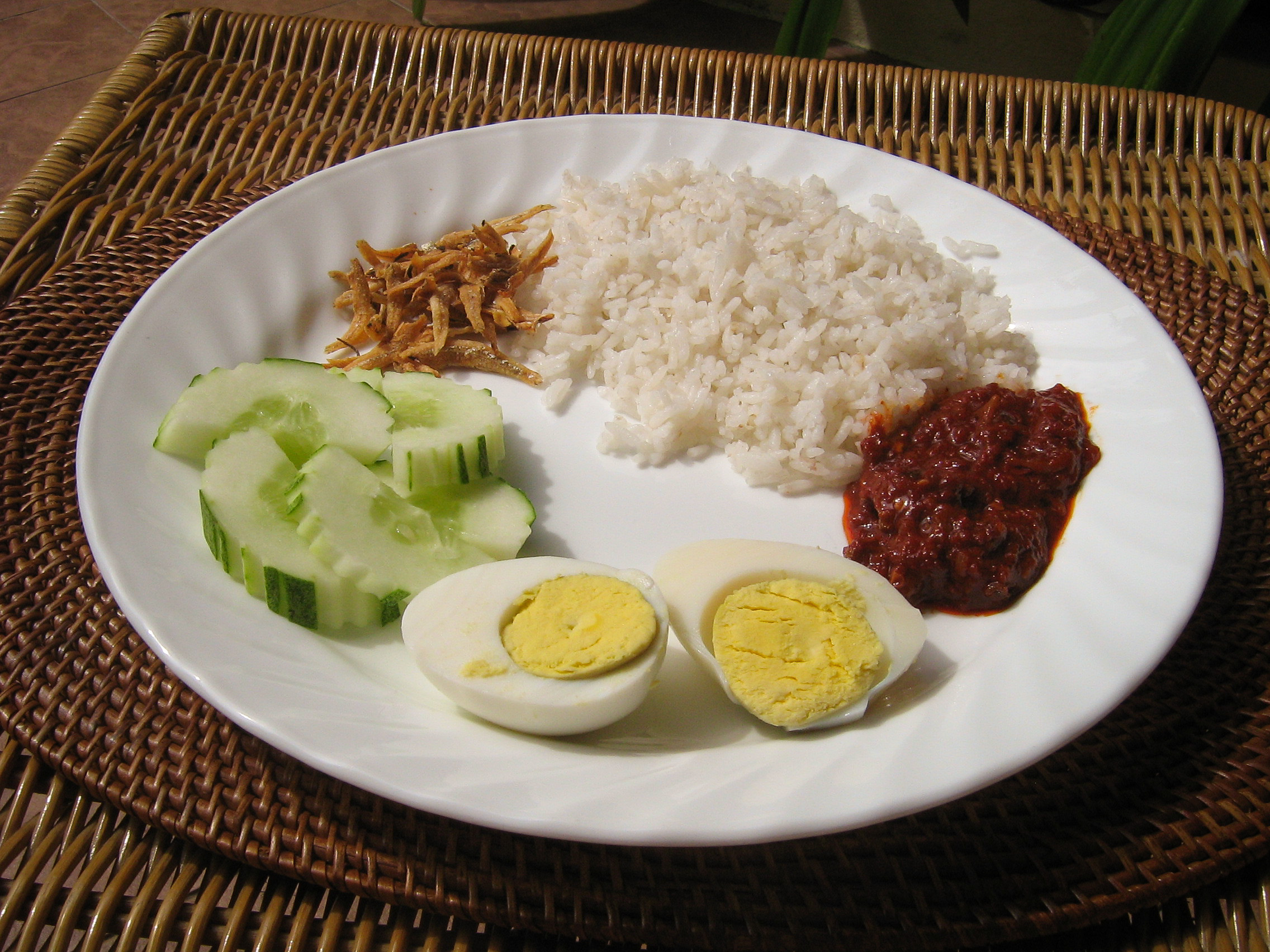
Traditional Malaysian nasi lemak in its basic form: sambal, fried anchovies, sliced cucumbers, and boiled egg

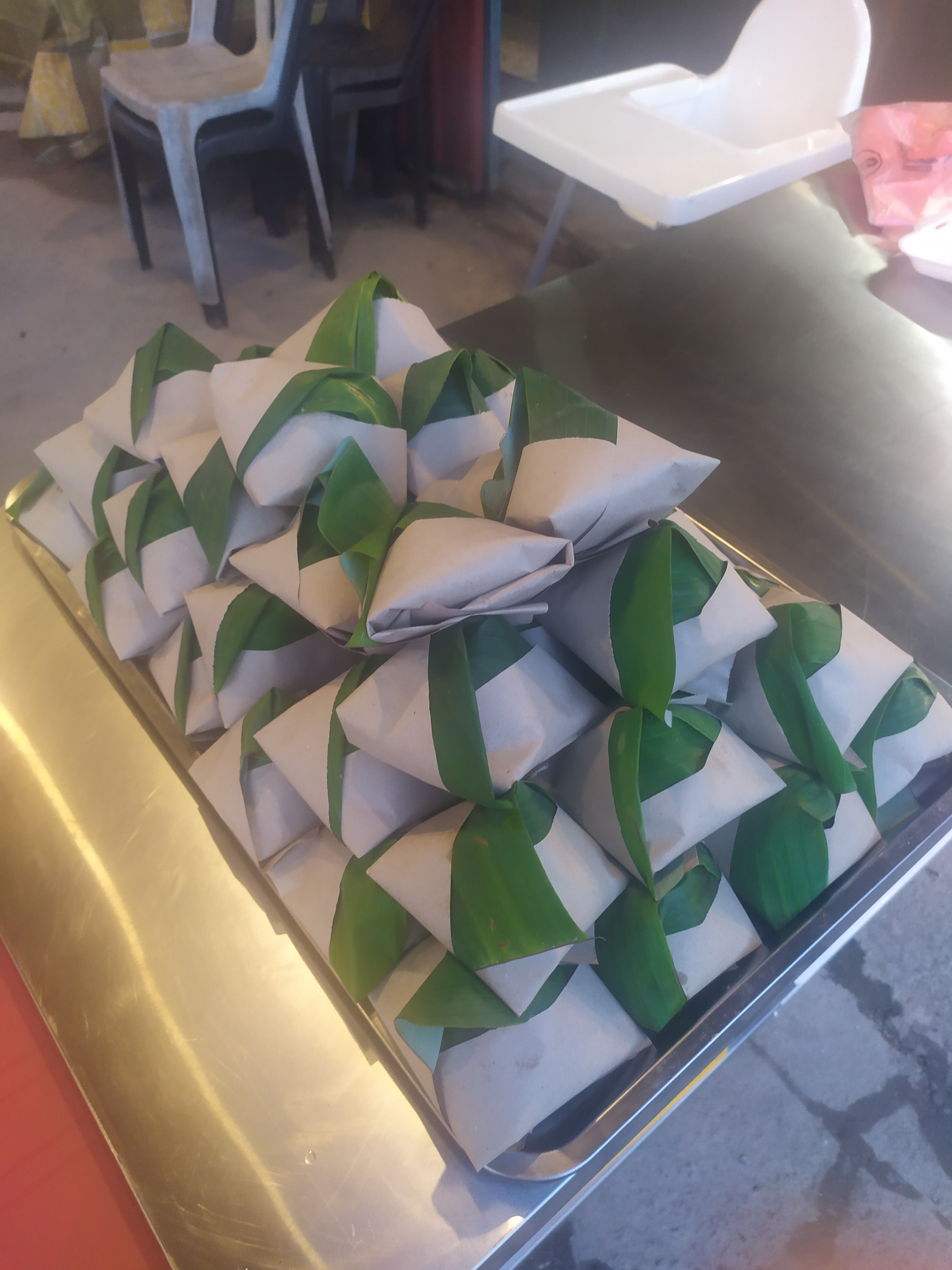
Stacked packs of nasi lemak in a kedai makan

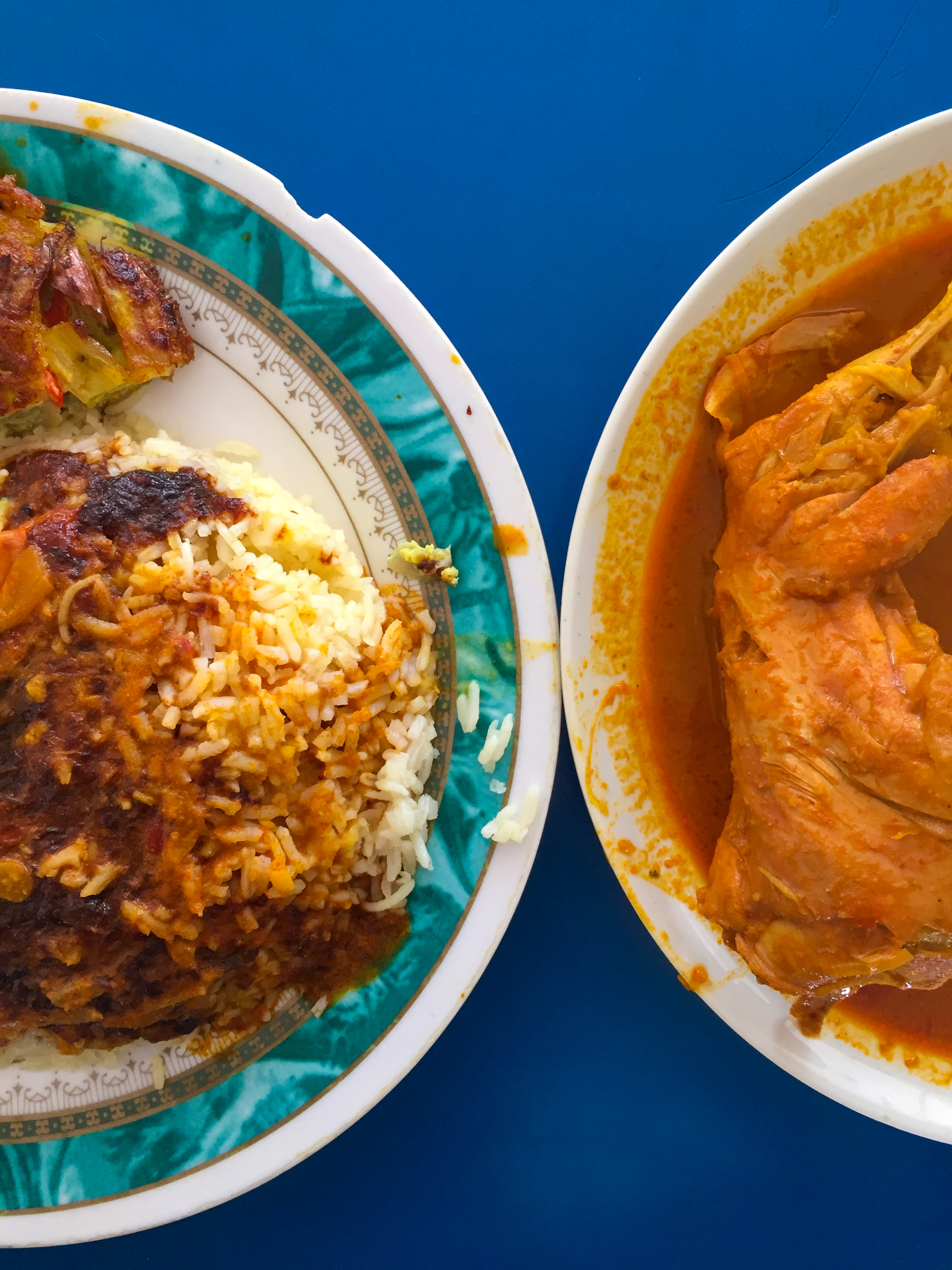
An Alor Setar-style nasi lemak, served with curry and an omelette

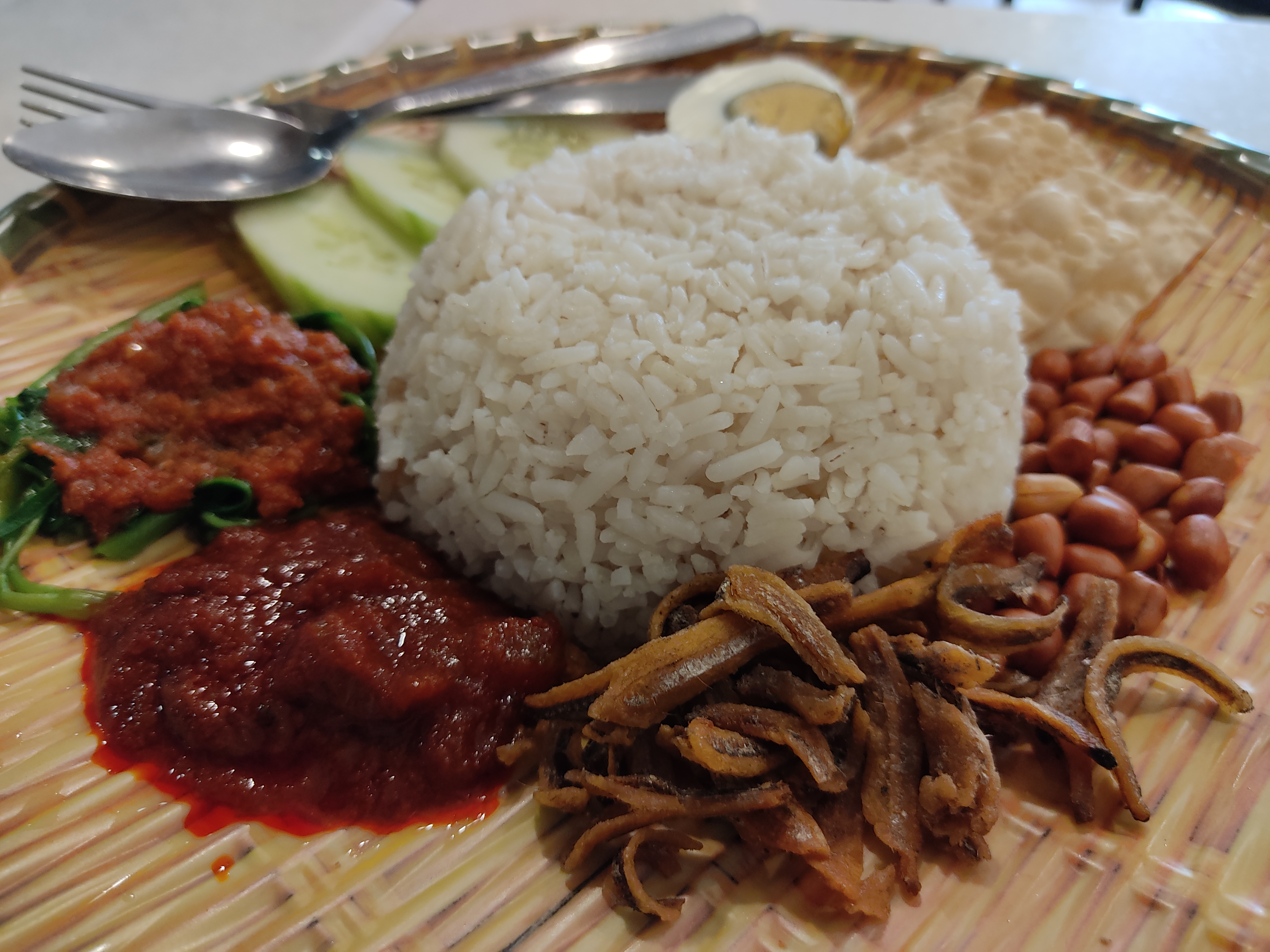
Malaccan nasi lemak kangkung

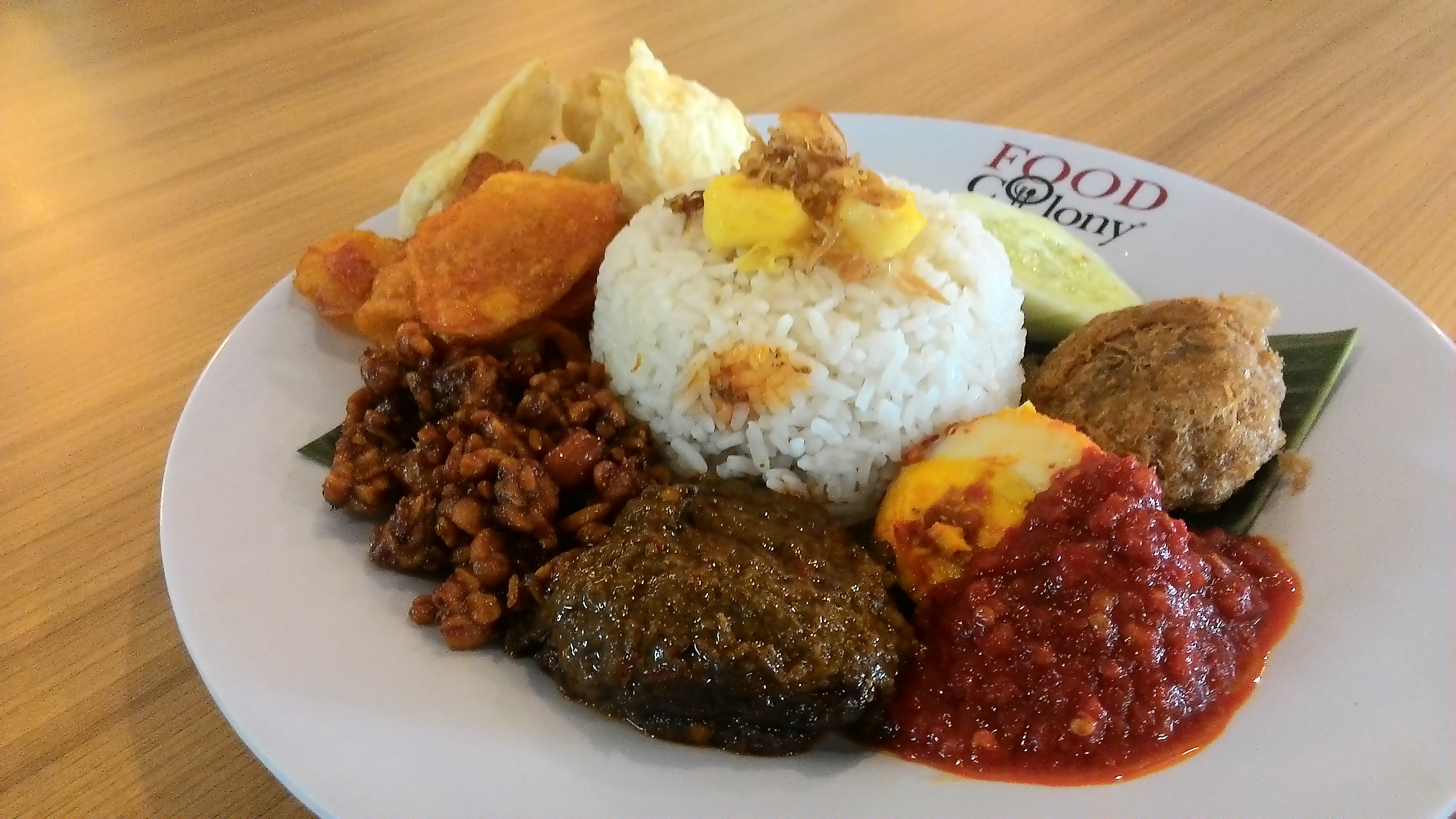
Nasi lemak Medan with emping and potato crisps, sweet fried tempeh, beef rendang, egg balado, perkedel, and cucumber, topped with egg bits and fried shallot

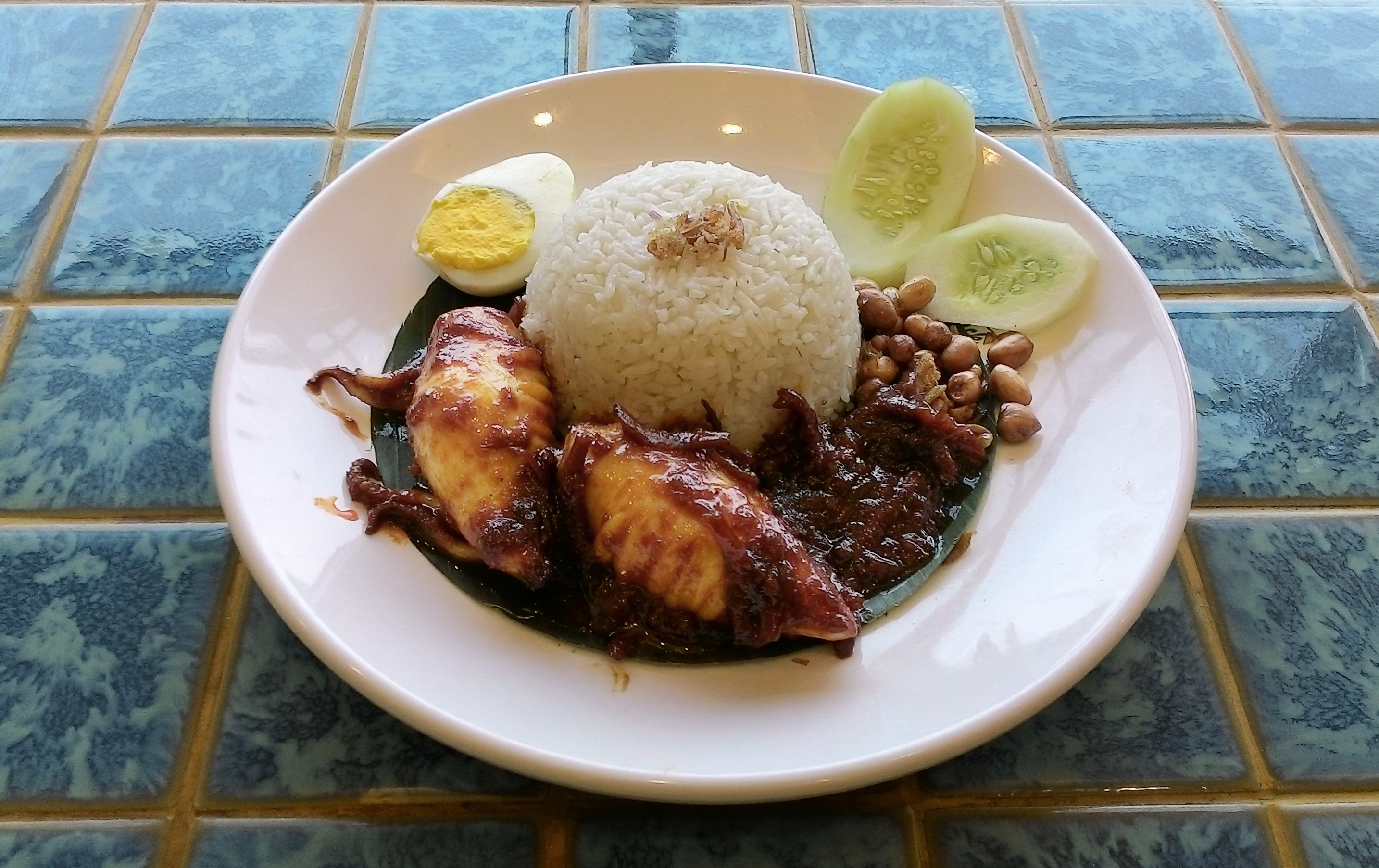
Nasi lemak in the Riau Islands, usually served with seafood, such as spicy chilli squid, anchovy sambal, peanuts, boiled egg, sprinkled with bawang goreng, and slices of cucumber

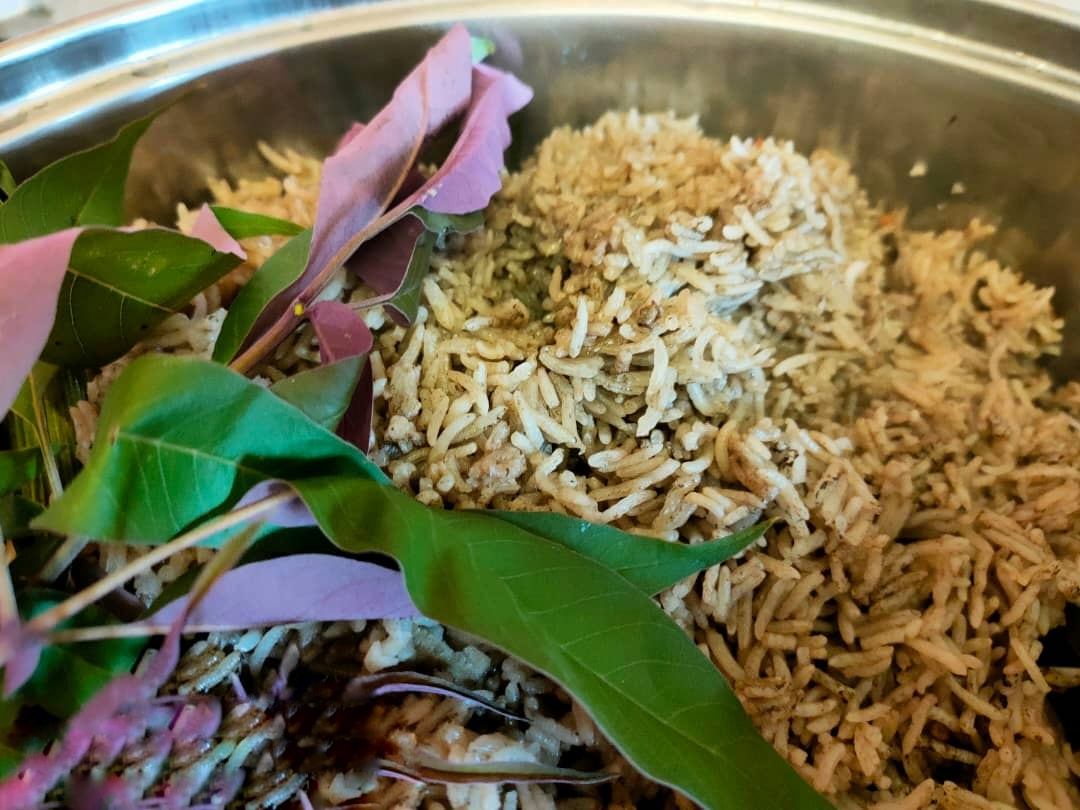
Preparation of nasi lemuni

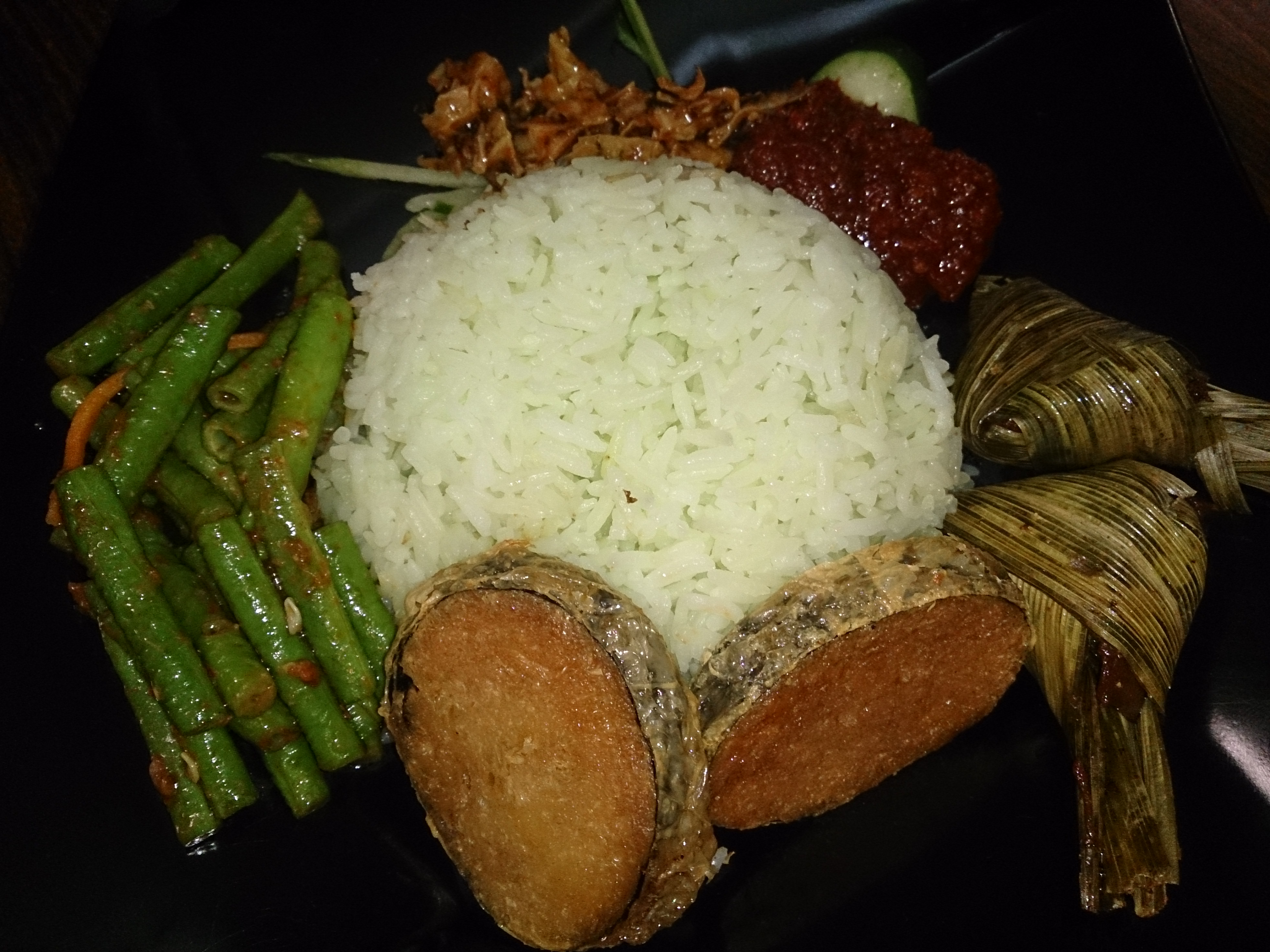
Vegetarian nasi lemak

== See also ==
- List of rice dishes
- Cuisine of Malaysia
- Cuisine of Singapore
- Cuisine of Indonesia
- Mamak stall
- Nasi dagang
- Nasi kuning
- Nasi ulam
