= Varieties of sambal =

Chili-based sauces and condiments

Sambal is a group of chili-based sauces and condiments widely consumed in maritime Southeast Asia, especially in Indonesia, Malaysia, Brunei, Singapore and Sri Lanka. Traditionally made by grinding fresh or dried chili peppers with ingredients such as shrimp paste, garlic, shallots and lime juice, sambal is served as a condiment, dipping sauce,or cooking ingredient. Its flavour ranges from mildly spicy to intensely hot, often reflecting local tastes and the availability of regional ingredients.

Across Indonesia alone, culinary records and ethnographic surveys identify between 212 and 300 varieties of sambal. Each region has developed distinctive recipes, from fruit-based sambals of South Kalimantan and Palembang to the andaliman-infused sambals of the Batak people in North Sumatra, lemongrass-rich Balinese sambal matah, and fermented durian sambal tempoyak found in Sumatra. In Malaysia, sambal belacan is a staple, while Sri Lankan sambols are usually prepared from uncooked ingredients such as coconut, onion and lime.

In addition to being served as a condiment, sambal is also used as a base for cooking. Many Indonesian, Malaysian, Singaporean and Bruneian dishes are prepared by stir-frying sambal with meat, seafood or vegetables, creating dishes such as sambal goreng ati (liver), udang balado (chilli shrimp), and sambal tumis kangkung (water spinach). In some regions, specific sambals are closely associated with traditional meals or festive occasions, contributing both flavour and cultural identity to local cuisine.

== Indonesia ==
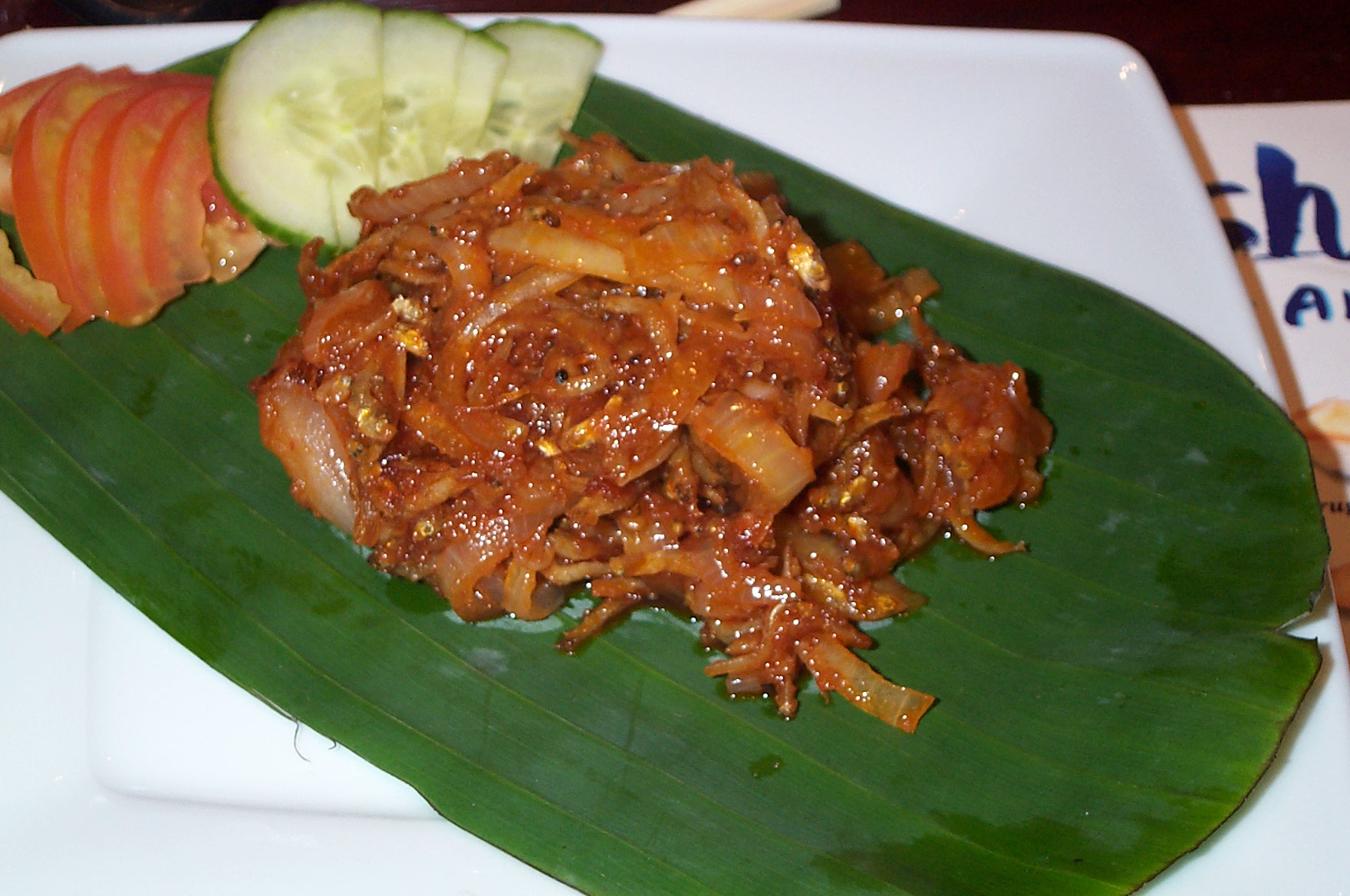
Anchovy in sambal

In the Indonesian archipelago, there are as many as 212 to 300 varieties of sambal. The intensity ranges from mild to very hot. Some varieties include:

Sambal acan
Fruit sambal, which is acan or belacan (shrimp paste) sambal mixed with tropical fruits of Kalimantan. Specialty of Banjar culture of South Kalimantan. Sliced tropical local fruits used in this sambal including young raw mango, binjai (white mango), gandaria, belimbing wuluh, limau kuit or key lime.
Sambal andaliman
Sambal made of andaliman pepper, locally known as merica batak (Batak pepper). Culinary signature of Batak tribes of North Sumatra.
Sambal asam
This is similar to sambal terasi with an addition of tamarind concentrate. Asam means tamarind or sour or acid in Indonesian.
Sambal bajak (badjak)
Banten sambal. Chilli (or another kind of red pepper) fried with oil, shallot, garlic, terasi, candlenuts, palm sugar and other condiments. This is darker and richer in flavour than sambal asam.

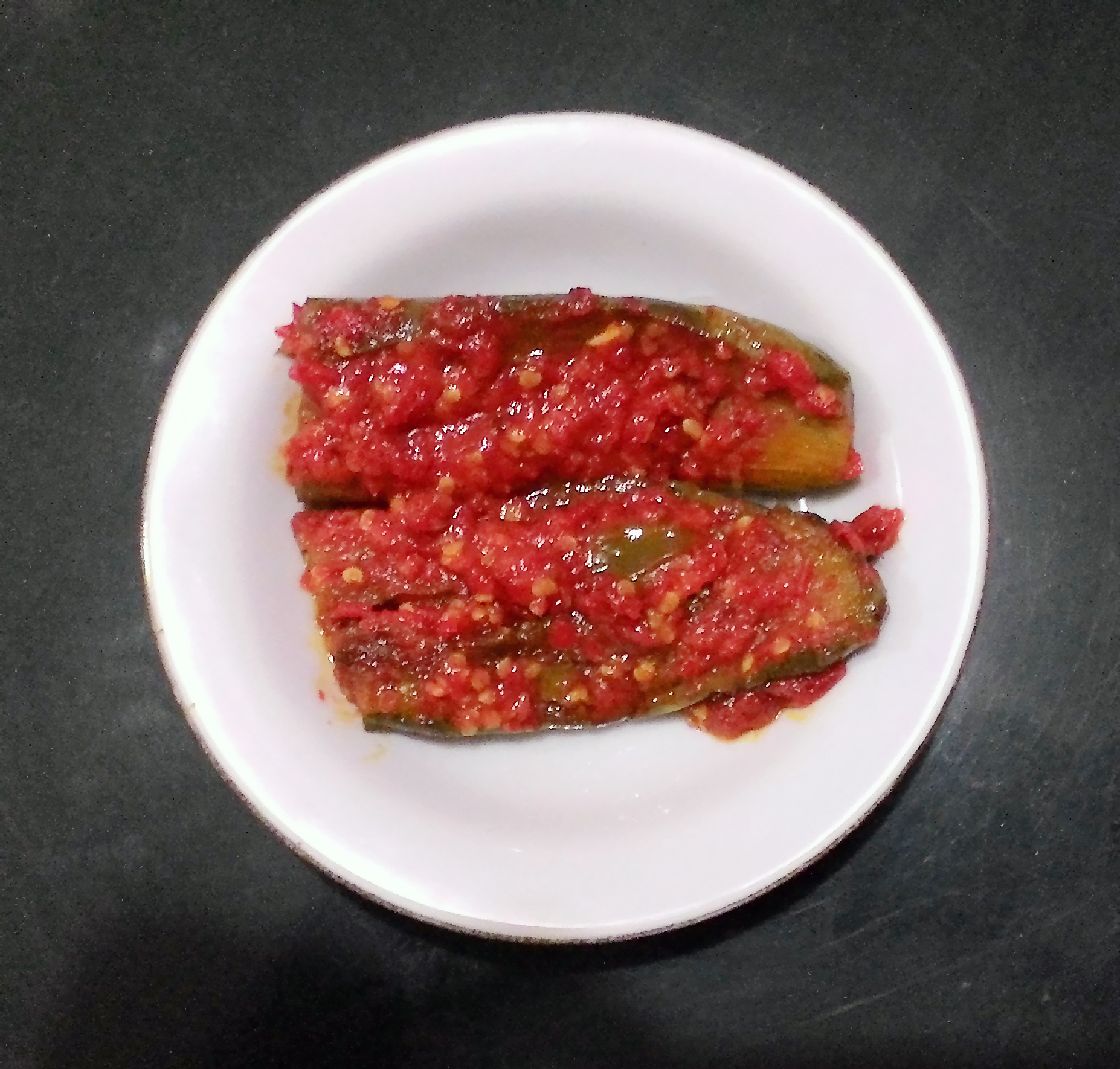
Eggplant in sambal balado

Sambal balado
Minangkabau style sambal. Chilli pepper or green chili is blended together with garlic, shallot, red or green tomato, salt and lemon or lime juice, then sauteed with oil. Minang sambal balado often mixed with other ingredients to create a dish, such as egg, eggplant, shrimp or anchovy.
Sambal bawang
Sambal made from sliced shallot, chilli pepper, garlic, shrimp paste and lemon juice.
Sambal beberuk terong
A type of sambal from West Nusa Tenggara, made of chili, tomato, shallot, asparagus bean, and pea eggplant.
Sambal belimbing or sambal belimbing wuluh
Sambal made of sour tasting belimbing wuluh (Averrhoa bilimbi), can be found in some places in Indonesia, especially in Java and East Nusa Tenggara.
Sambal bengkoang
Jicama (bengkoang) sambal, made from the mixture of jicama or replaced with water chestnut, red chillies, garlic, Asian basil, shrimp paste and lemon juice.
Sambal berandal (brandal)
A fried sambal made with kemiri nuts, garlic and onion. Sometimes tamarind (asem) or kaffir lime leaves (daun djeruk perut) are added.
Sambal bongkot
A speciality sambal from Bali, sambal with a mixture of sweet, sour, and spicy flavours, made with bongkot or kecombrang flower stems, shallots, chilli, grilled shrimp paste, sugar, salt, and lime juice.

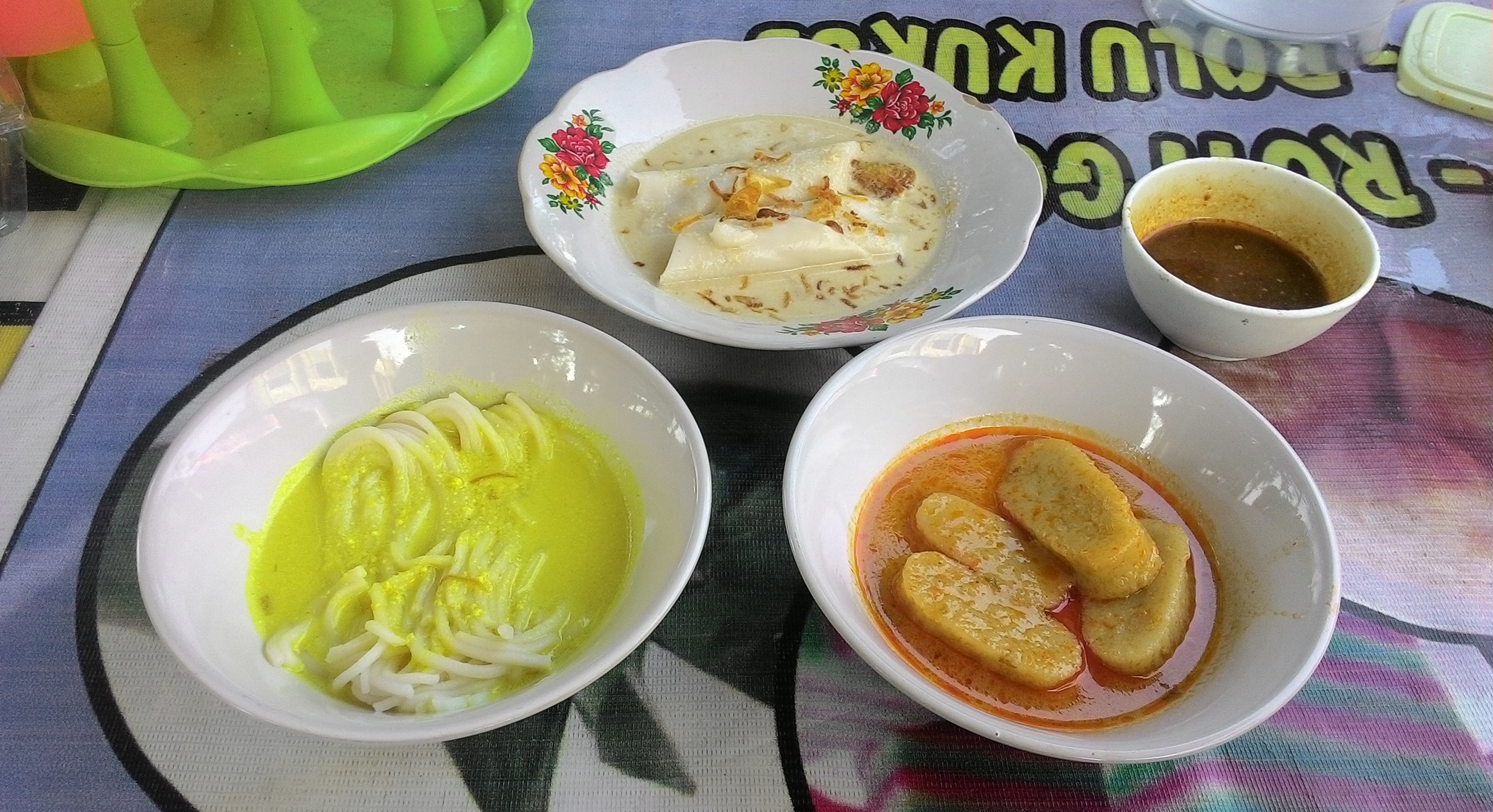
Palembang sambal buah (in the top right bowl) as a condiment to spice up lakso, burgo, and laksan.

Sambal buah
(lit: fruit sambal) Speciality of Palembang, made from the mixture of chilli, shrimp paste, kemang (a type of mango) and pineapple.

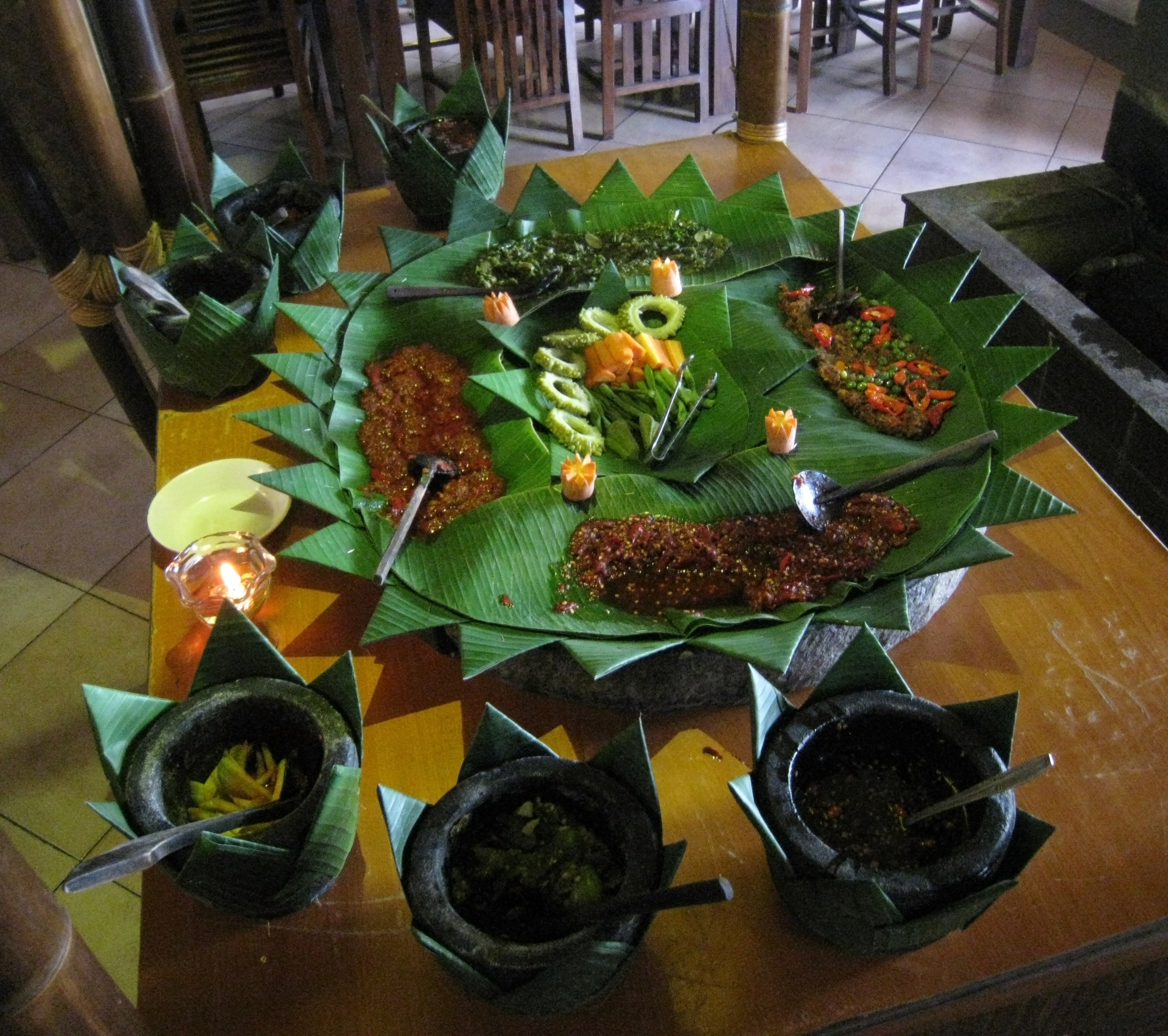
Variants of sambal cibiuk

Sambal cibiuk
A sambal recipe speciality of Cibiuk village, Garut Regency, West Java. It consists of coarsely chopped and ground green bird's eye chilli, green raw tomato, shallot, galangal, lemon basil, shrimp paste and salt.
Sambal colo-colo
From Ambon, it consists of chilli, tomato pieces, shallots and lime and has a chiefly sour taste. It is suitable for barbecue dishes, especially fish. Some variations add butter or vegetable oil to the sambal.

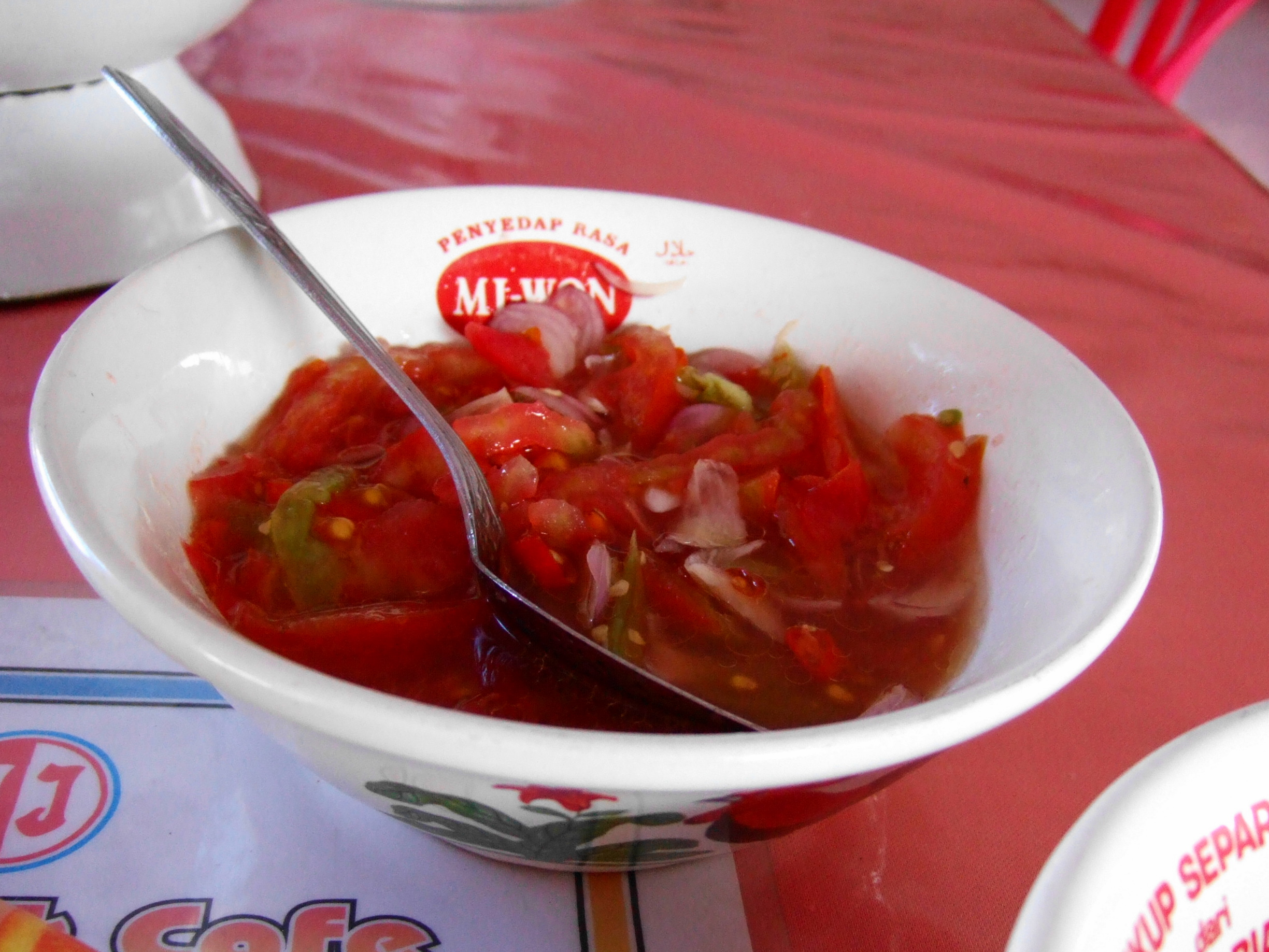
Sambal dabu-dabu

Sambal dabu-dabu
Dabu-dabu comes close to the Mexican salsa, it is of Manado origin. It consists of coarsely chopped tomatoes, calamansi or known as lemon cui or jeruk kesturi, shallots, chopped bird's eye chili, red chilli, basil, poured with hot vegetable oil, salt.
Sambal durian or Sambal tempoyak
It is made from fermented durian called tempoyak. The fermentation process takes three to five days. The chilli and the tempoyak may be readily mixed or served separately, to cater the individual preference in ratio of chili to tempoyak to determine the scale of hotness. This sambal is available in two varieties: raw and cooked. In the cooked variety, pounded chillies, shallots and lemongrass are stir-fried with anchovies, tempoyak and turmeric leaf (for aroma). Petai (Parkia speciosa) and tapioca shoots are also frequently added. The sweet-sour-hot sambal can be found in Sumatra and Kalimantan (Indonesian Borneo), especially in Palembang and Bengkulu, and also in Malay Peninsula.
Sambal ebi
Dried shrimp (ebi) sambal, made from the mixture of dried shrimp, candlenut, galangal, red chillies, shallot, garlic, brown sugar and salt.
Sambal gami
Sambal made of ground chili pepper, shrimp paste, tomato slices, onion slices, sugar, salt, and seasoning, cooked with several types of cockles on earthenware plate. Specialty of Bontang coastal town in East Kalimantan.
Sambal gandaria
Freshly ground sambal terasi with shredded gandaria, a kind of tropical fruit native to Southeast Asia.
Sambal goang
An extra hot Sundanese sambal associated with the town of Tasikmalaya, made from the mixture of cayenne pepper, garlic, salt and kencur (Kaempferia galanga).
Sambal goreng
Literally means "fried sambal". It is a mix of crisp fried red shallots, red and green chilli, shrimp paste and salt, briefly stir-fried in coconut oil. It can be made into a whole different dish by adding other ingredients, such as sambal goreng ati (mixed with diced liver) or sambal goreng udang (added with small shrimp).

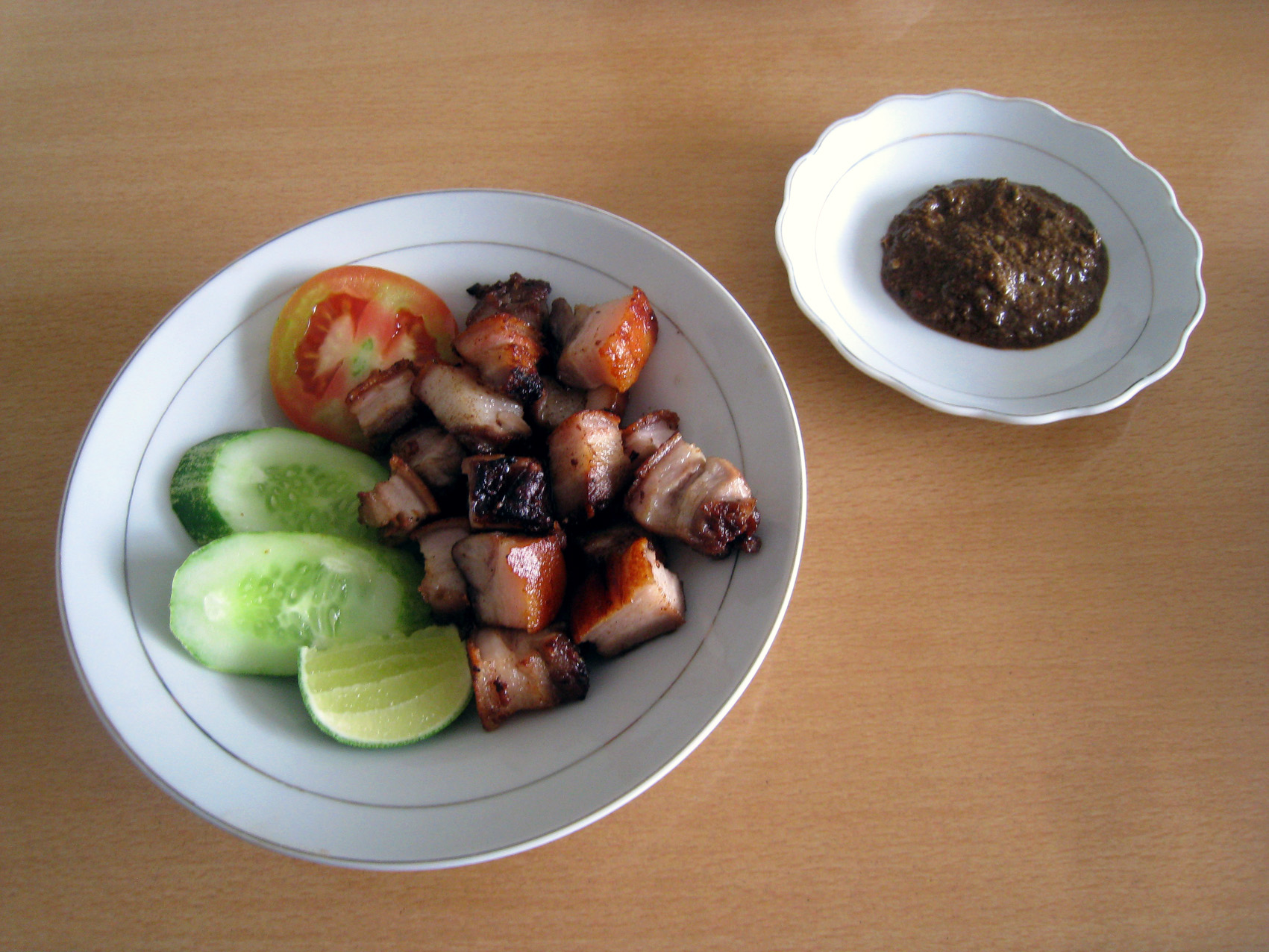
Batak dish panggang served with sambal gota as a dipping sauce

Sambal gota
Blood sambal made of andaliman, chili pepper, garlic and other seasoning mixed and cooked with pork blood or sometimes chicken blood. Specialty of Batak cuisine, North Sumatra.
Sambal jenggot
Sambal with addition of grated coconut, similar to urap.
Sambal jengkol
Freshly ground sambal terasi mixed with sliced fried jengkol, a kind of tropical bean with slightly stinky aroma native to Southeast Asia. Sambal jengkol can be found in Sundanese and Cirebon cuisine.
Sambal kalasan
Sometimes also called sambal jawa, a Javanese stir-fried sambal similar to sambal tumis. It uses a handful of gula jawa palm sugar which gives its dark brown color, tomato, spices and chilli. The overall flavour is sweet, with mild hints of spices and chili.
Sambal kacang
A mixture of chilli with garlic, shallot, sugar, salt, crushed fried peanuts, and water. Usually used as condiments for nasi uduk, ketan, or otak-otak. The simple version only employ cabe rawit chilli, crushed fried peanuts, and water.
Sambal kandas serai
A typical sambal of the Dayak tribe in Central Kalimantan, made of chilies, lemon grass and shredded fish.
Sambal kecap
A sambal consists of Indonesian kecap manis (sweet soy sauce), red chilli, tomato pieces, shallots and lime, it has a sweet and spicy taste and usually used for barbecue dishes.
Sambal kecombrang
A sambal made from kecombrang (Etlingera elatior) flower, mixed with red cayenne pepper, shallot, garlic, salt and lime leaves.

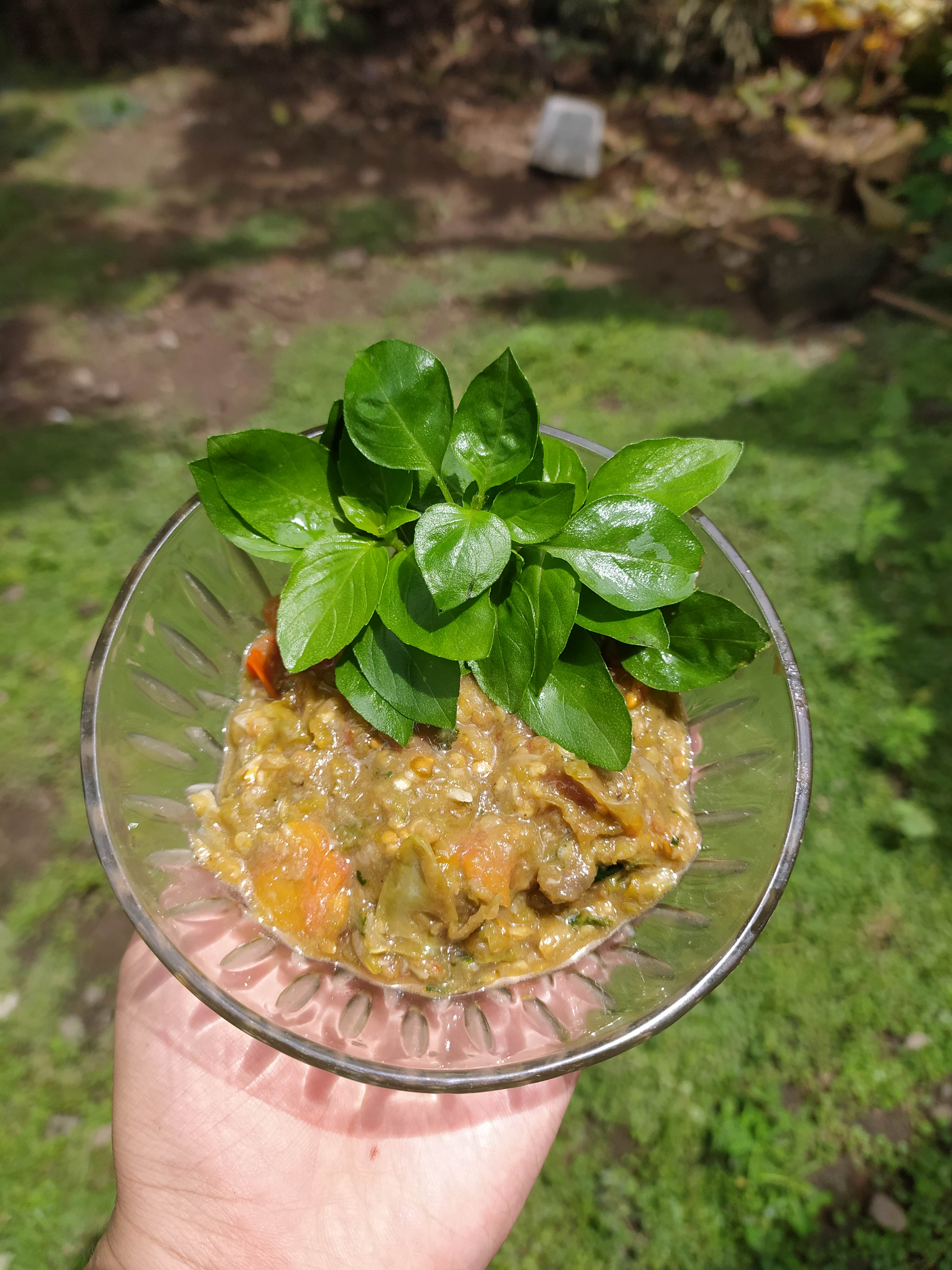
Sambal kemangi

Sambal kemangi
Sambal made with a mixture kemangi (Lemon basil) fragrant leaf.
Sambal kemiri
This is similar to sambal terasi with addition of candlenuts.
Sambal kenari
Sambal made with a mixture of kenari (Canarium ovatum) nut, speciality of Maluku islands.

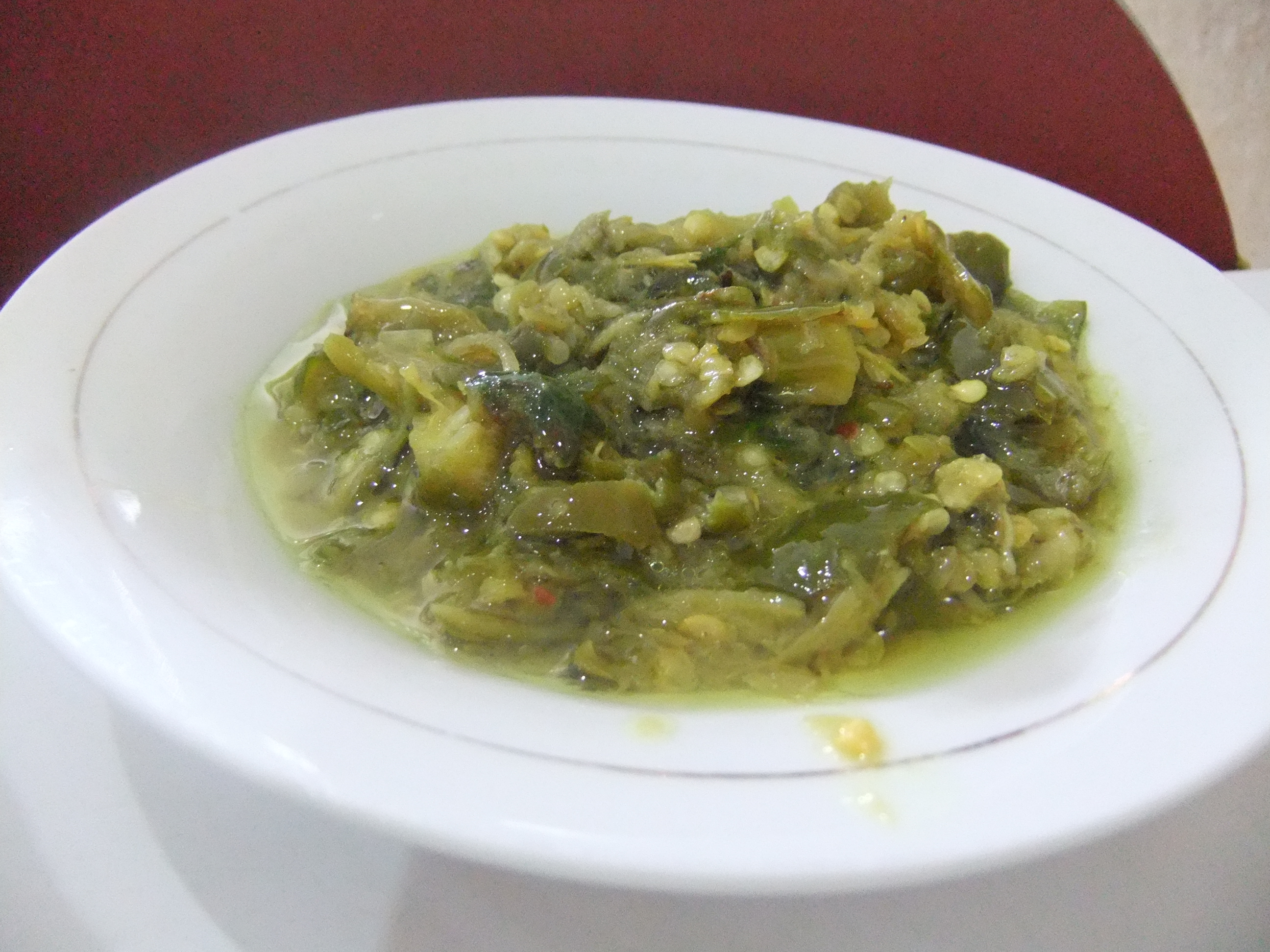
Minang sambal ijo

Sambal lado mudo or sambal ijo
Literally a Minangkabau word for "green sambal". It is also known as sambal hijau or sambal ijo, also "green sambal". Sambal lado mudo, a West Sumatran speciality, used green chilli, stir-fried with dried shrimp, red shallots, garlic, and spices. It is less hot compared to common sambals, and has a fresh flavour that complements the richness of Sumatran food.
Sambal lado uwok
A sambal made from steamed chili, garlic, shallot, tomato and mixed with sauteed anchovies.

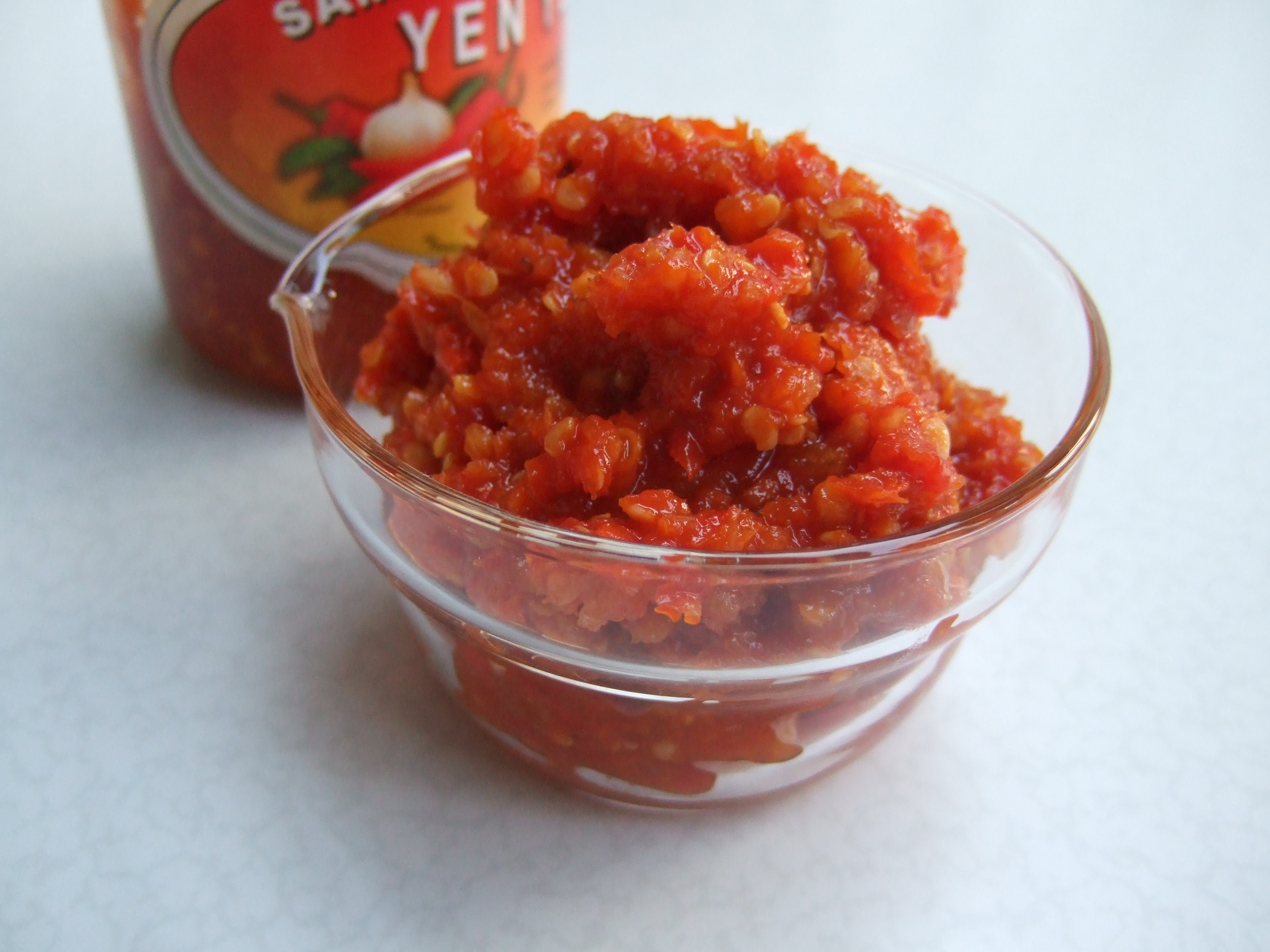
Sambal lampung

Sambal lampung
A popular variant of slightly sweet chilli, garlic, tomato sambal of Lampung origin, Sumatra.
Sambal leunca
A Sundanese sambal, especially popular in West Java, made with the mixture of red chilli pepper, bird's eye chilli, shallot, shrimp paste and leunca (Solanum nigrum) berries.

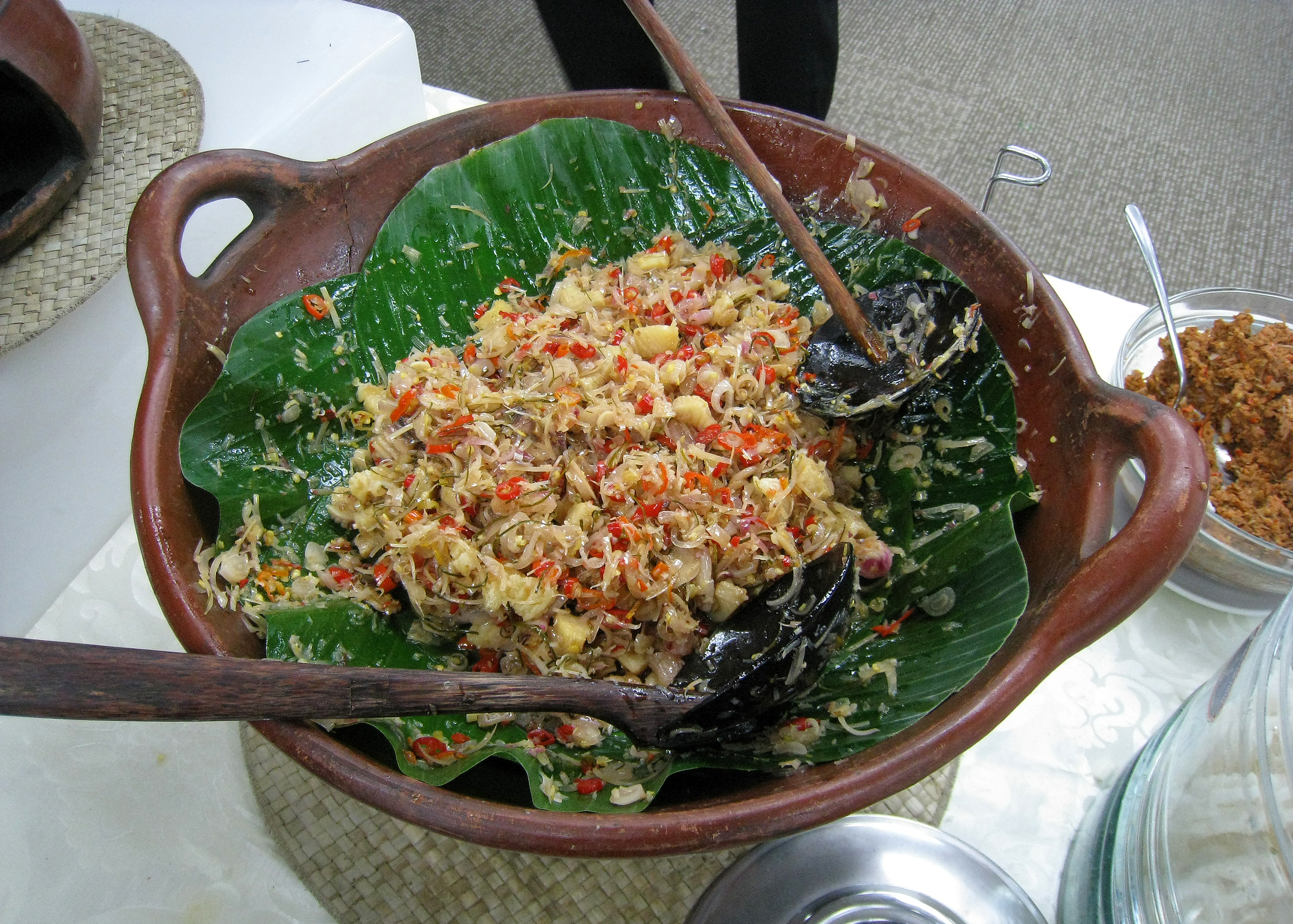
Balinese sambal matah

Sambal luat
Sambal made of the mixture of red chilli pepper, terasi shrimp paste, key lime juice, shallot, scallion, coriander, tomato, salt. Specialty of East Nusa Tenggara province. Usually consumed as a condiment to accompany Se'i smoked pork or beef.
Sambal mandai
Sambal made with mixture of fermented inner skin of cempedak fruit (Artocarpus integer), specialty of East Kalimantan.
Sambal matah
Raw shallot and lemongrass sambal of Bali origin. It contains a lot of finely chopped shallots, chopped bird's eye chilli, lemongrass, cooking oil with a dash of lime juice.
Sambal pare
Bitter gourd sambal. Ground chilli and shallot fried with finely chopped bitter gourd to reduce bitterness.
Sambal pecak
Sambal pecak is served as the condiment of fried fish or chicken. The Betawi version is more soupy and using ginger in the sambal.
Sambal petai
A mixture of red chilli, garlic, shallot, and petai green stinky bean as the main ingredients.

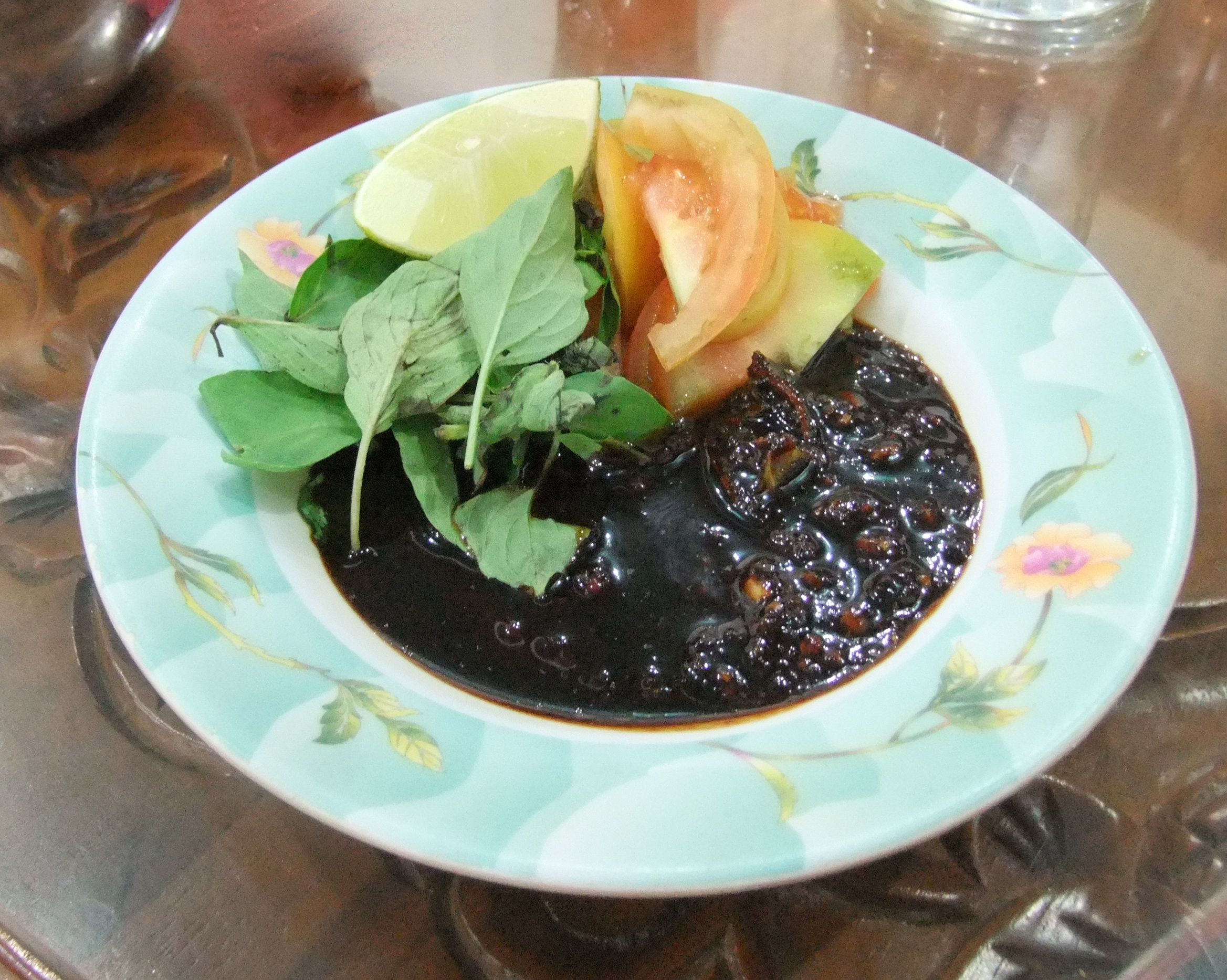
East Javanese sambal petis

Sambal petis
An east Javanese sambal uses chilli, petis (a kind of shrimp paste), peanuts, young banana, herbs and spices.
Sambal pencit/mangga muda
Green mango sambal from Central Java. Freshly ground sambal terasi with shredded young unripe mango. This is a good accompaniment to seafood. Pencit means young mango in Indonesian.
Sambal plecing
Originating from Lombok island, the sambal consists of Lombok's chili variety and Lombok's lengkare shrimp paste, tomatoes, salt, and lime juice.
Sambal rampai
A sambal from Lampung made of chili and rampai tomato.
Sambal rica rica
A hot sambal from Manado region, it uses ginger, chili, lemon and spices. Suitable for barbecue meats and chicken.
Sambal roa
Spicy smoked roa fish (halfbeak) sambal from Manado region, North Sulawesi.
Sambal rujak
Rujak spicy sauce, made from palm sugar, tamarind, chili pepper and shrimp paste.
sambal serai
a sambal made from chopped onions, garlic cloves, chilis, lemongrass, salt, shrimp paste, sugar, tamarind or kaffir lime water, cooked with butter or coconut oil.
Sambal serdadu
a sambal made from chopped onions, chilies, shrimp paste water, salt, water and cooked with butter or coconut oil. It designed for soldiers during colonial era or wartime era.
Sambal seruit
A sambal from Lampung, made of fish, tempoyak, chili, shrimp paste, and aren palm juice.
Sambal setan
A very hot sambal with Madame Jeanette peppers (red brownish, very sharp). The name literally means "devil's sauce". It is popular in Surabaya.
Sambal taliwang
This variant is native to Taliwang, a village near Mataram, Lombok Island, and is made from naga jolokia pepper grown specially in Lombok, garlic and Lombok shrimp paste. A kilogram of naga jolokia pepper is extracted, ground and pressed. This is mixed with ground garlic and shrimp paste, then cooked with vegetable oil.
Sambal tape (tapai)
A variant of sambal from Tegal in Central Java that consists of chili pepper, salt and the addition of sour fermented cassava called tapai. Usually served to spice up krupuk crackers or vegetables.
Sambal tauco
A Sulawesi sambal, contains the Chinese tauco, lime juice, chilli, brown sugar, and salt.
Sambal terasi
A common Indonesian style of sambal with a distinct shrimp paste flavor. Similar to the Malaysian belacan, but with a stronger flavour, since terasi is more tangy and fermented. Red and green peppers, terasi, sugar, salt, lemon or lime juice (tangy, strong). One version omits the lime juice and has the sambal fried with pounded tomatoes. Popularly eaten raw. Alternate spelling in the Netherlands: trassi or trassie.
Sambal teri lado
A Padang speciality, sambal is made using chilli pepper, tomato, shallot, spices, and mixed with salted ikan teri (anchovy). The sambal is stir fried and similar to Malay sambal ikan.

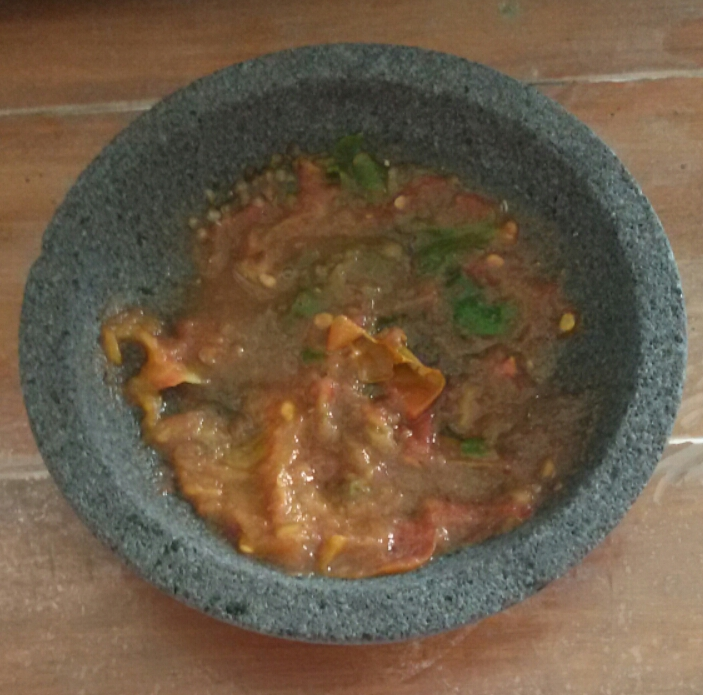
Fresh tomato sambal with only 1 chilli from Java, Indonesia

Sambal terung asam
Sour and spicy sambal made of terung dayak (Solanum ferox), specialty of Kalimantan (Indonesian Borneo).
Sambal tomat
Similar to sambal tumis but with the addition of crushed tomato and sugar. It can be served as fresh sambal or stirred sambal. The tomato is stir fried along with the other ingredients until a paste-like consistency. The overall taste is hot and sweet, it is a good mix with lalapan. For very young children, sambal tomat sometimes uses very little or no chilli at all; it is regarded as one of the first steps in introducing children to the taste of Indonesian sambal.

Sambal tuktuk
A traditional hot and spicy condiments typically served in Batak cuisine of Batak people, native of Tapanuli region, North Sumatra, Indonesia. The ingredients to make sambal tuktuk is similar to other chili sauce ingredients, distinguished by the use of andaliman (Sichuan pepper). It is often served as tuktuk aso-aso, being mixed with dried fish called aso-aso (a type of dried and preserved mackerel), but sometimes aso-aso fish is replaced with fresh anchovy.
Sambal tumis
Chilli fried with belacan shrimp paste, onions, garlic, tamarind juice. Tumis means 'stir fry'. Often the cooking oil is re-mixed with the sambal. It may be mixed with other ingredients to produce dishes such as sambal kangkong, sambal cumi (squid) and sambal telur (egg).
Sambal tumpang
Javanese sambal made from the mixture of chili pepper, other spices and semangit (old and pungent) tempeh.
Sambal udang bawang
A speciality sambal from Surabaya. It is one of Indonesia's super hot sambal. It used simple ingredients, such as chili pepper, shallot, garlic, asam jawa (tamarind) and coconut oil. People of Surabaya often called it Njaluk Sambal, as they eat it with fragrant steamed white rice.

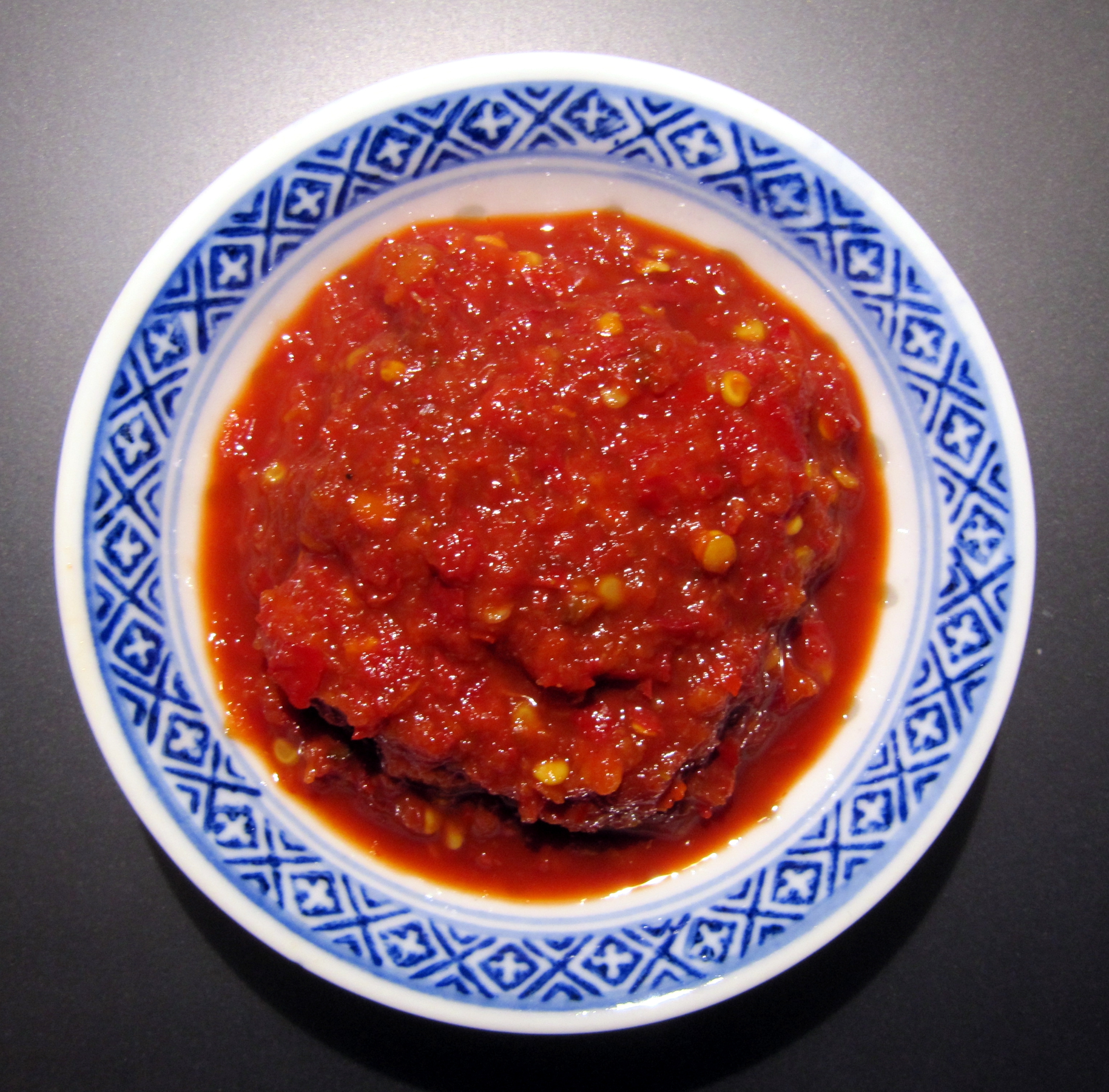
Sambal oelek

Sambal ulek (oelek)
Raw chilli paste (bright red, thin and sharp-tasting). Can be used as the base for making other sambals or as an ingredient for other cuisines. Some types of this variant call for the addition of salt or lime into the red mixture. Oelek is the old pre-1947 Indonesian spelling (based on Dutch orthography) which has since become ulek. The pronunciation has not changed and is in line with Malay pronunciation. Some suppliers use the older spelling due to its association with the Dutch East Indies and Indo culture. Cobek is Indonesian special stoneware derived from the common village basalt stone kitchenware still ubiquitous in kitchens, particularly in Java. The cobek is a mortar shaped like a hybrid of a dinner and soup-plate with an old, cured bamboo root or stone pestle (ulek or ulekan) employed in an ulek manner: a crushing and twisting motion (like using a screwdriver) for crushing lime leaves, chilies, peppers, shallots, peanuts, and other kinds of ingredients.
Sambal stroberi
A sambal made with strawberries originated from Bandung, West Java. Usually served to accompany breaded fish cutlet.

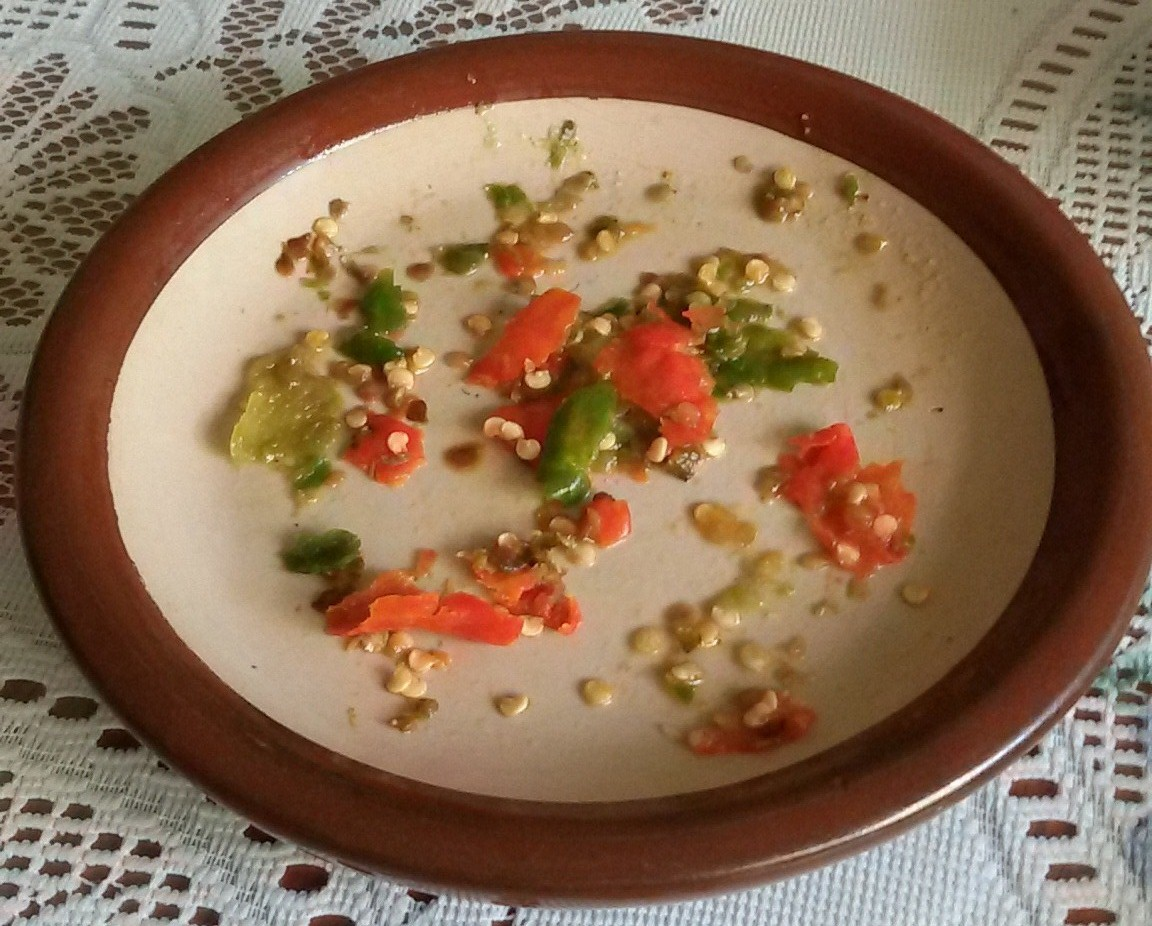
uyah-lombok sambal (lit. 'salt-chilli')

Sambal uyah-lombok
A kind of sambal which is only made from raw chilli and salt. Very simple and easy to make, and usually be eaten with steamed rice and fried foods like fried chicken.

== Malaysia ==
Sambal belacan
A Malay-style sambal. Fresh chillies are pounded together with toasted shrimp paste (belacan) in a stone mortar to which sugar and lime juice are added. Limau kesturi or calamansi lime is used traditionally but may be substituted with lime outside Southeast Asia. Tomatoes are optional ingredients. Sometimes, sweet-sour mangoes or equivalent local fruits are also used. It can be eaten with cucumbers or ulam (leafy herbs) in a meal of rice and other dishes. A Malaysian-Chinese version is to fry belacan with chili.
Sambal jeruk
Green or red pepper with kaffir lime. In Malaysia, it is called cili (chili) jeruk (pickle). Sometimes vinegar and sugar are substituted for lime. Used as a condiment with fried rice and noodle-based dishes.

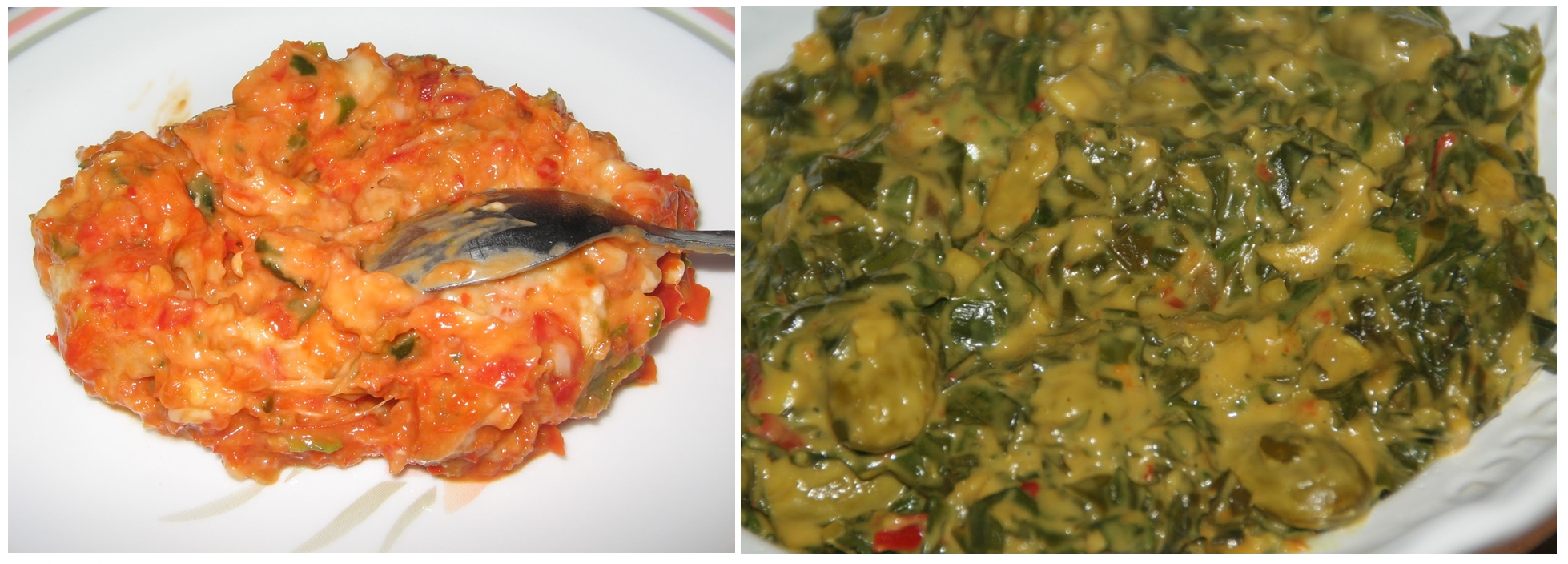
Raw sambal tempoyak on the left and the cooked version on the right

Sambal tempoyak
This sambal may be raw or cooked. Raw sambal tempoyak is prepared from fresh chilis pounded together with dried anchovies and served with fermented durian (tempoyak). The sambal and the tempoyak may be readily mixed or served separately, so that the person eating can determine the ratio of sambal to tempoyak that they want (tempoyak has a sweet-sour taste that offsets the hotness of the chilli). In the cooked variety, pounded chilis, shallots, and lemongrass are stir-fried with anchovies, tempoyak and turmeric leaf (for aroma). Commonly found in Pahang and Perak of Peninsular Malaysia, sambal tempoyak could be found also at Sumatra. Petai (Parkia speciosa) and tapioca shoots are also frequently added.
Sambal kicap
Made from a mix of sweet soy sauce, shallot, garlic, bird's eye chili for any fried dishes especially for fried banana, fried tempeh or condiment for soto and bihun soup.
Sambal goreng
Dishes consist of tempeh, anchovies, peanut fried together with sambal until dried.
Sambal kacang
Condiment for satay.
Sweet sambal
This is sambal made from dried chillies, fresh chilies, belacan and gula Melaka (palm sugar) as main ingredients. Sweet sambal is traditionally served with nasi lemak and also side dishes fried crispy anchovies, toasted peanuts, boiled egg and cucumber.

== Sri Lanka ==
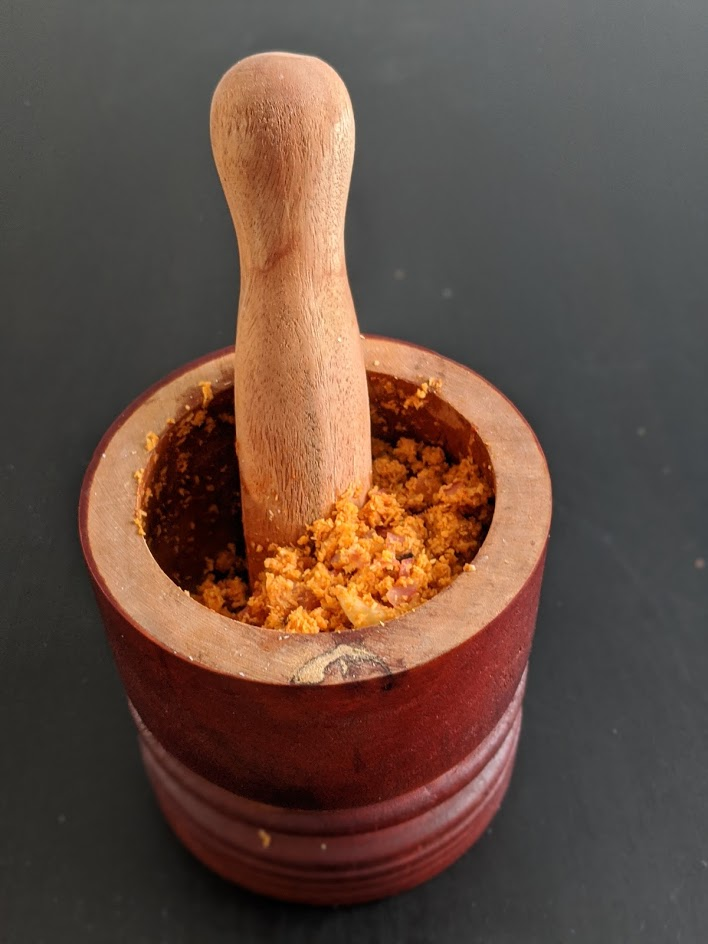
Pol sambol in a wooden mortar and pestle

Sambols in Sri Lanka differ from those originating in Malaysia and Indonesia, in that they are generally made from uncooked ingredients, such as fresh chillies, shallots, coconut, garlic, which are then ground with a mortar and pestle and mixed with a citric acid, such as lime or lemon juice. They resemble a Mexican salsa or Laotian jaew.

Seeni sambol
This is a hot/sweet sambal of the Sri Lankan cuisine that includes onion, crumbled Maldives fish, and spices as its main ingredients. Its name, also spelled as "sini sambol" or "seeni sambal", is derived from the local word for "sugar".

Pol sambol/Thengkai sambal
This is a sambal made of scraped coconut (pol and thengkai mean coconut in Sinhala and Tamil, respectively), onion, green chilli, red chilli powder, and lime juice as its main ingredients. Sometimes, crumbled Maldives fish is also added, and tomatoes can be used instead of lime juice for flavor.

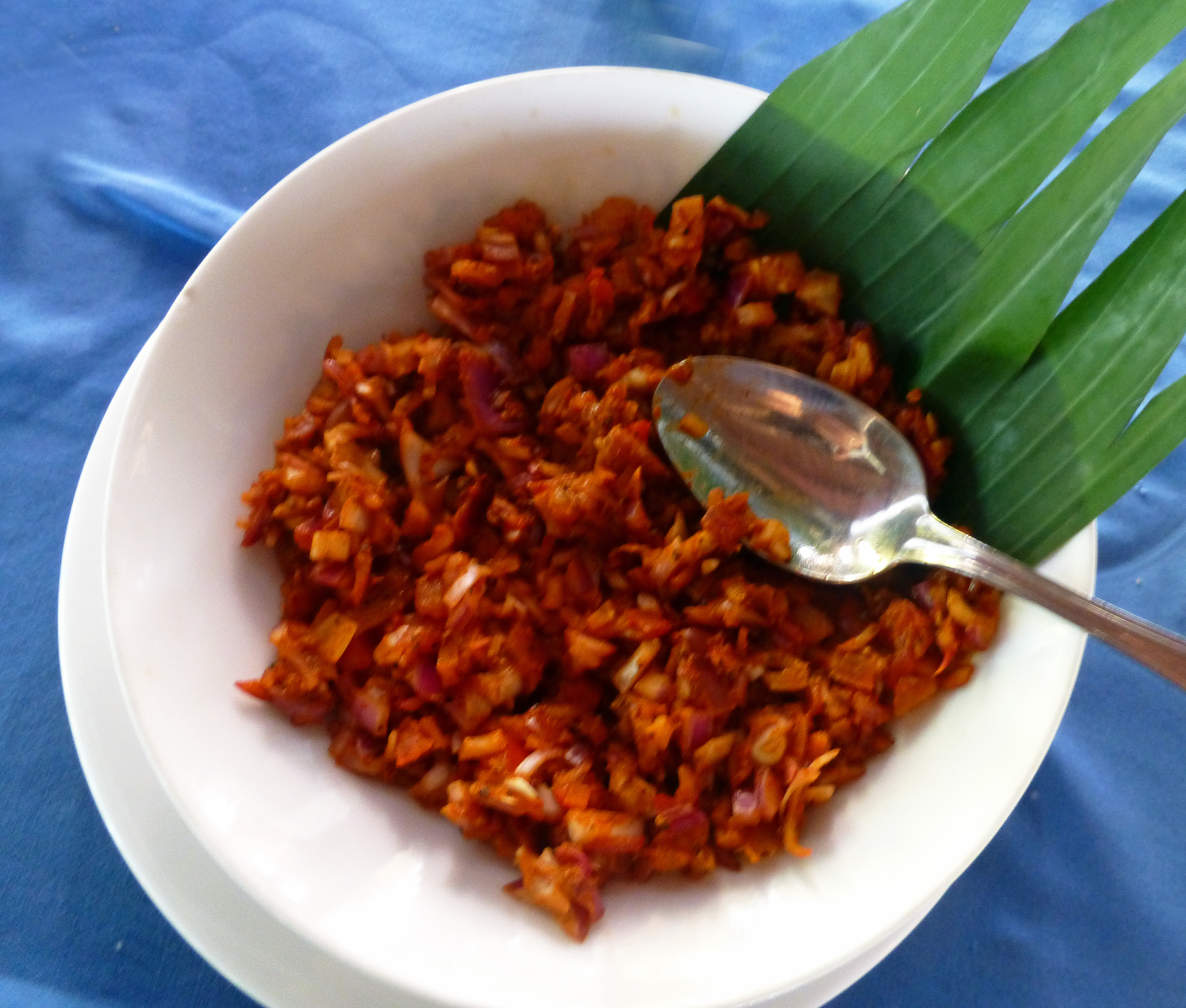
Lunumiris in a white serving dish

Lunumiris (Katta sambal)
This is a red onion sambal. The name "lunu miris" can be literally translated as "salt chili" and is a paste of red chilli pounded with sea salt. A widespread derivative is katta sambal, which adds onions, crumbled Maldives fish, salt, and lime juice to the chilli-and-salt mixture.

Vaalai kai sambal
This is sambal made of boiled and mashed plantain, scraped coconut, chopped green chillies and onion, salt and lime juice. Vaalai kai means unripe plantain in Sri Lankan Tamil.

Jaffna Tamils make campal that is more close to a chutney.

== Dishes ==
Sambal can also be used as an ingredient to a dish, which uses a large amount of chili peppers. The dishes started with the term sambal goreng means "fried sambal" dishes. It refer to stir fried sambal mixed with certain ingredients such as sambal goreng kentang (potato), sambal goreng hati (liver), sambal goreng krechek (cow's skin), sambal goreng teri (anchovy), etc. In Padang cuisine, any dishes started with balado- (lit: with chili pepper) indicate the sambal-mixed dish. Dishes bearing the word sambal include:

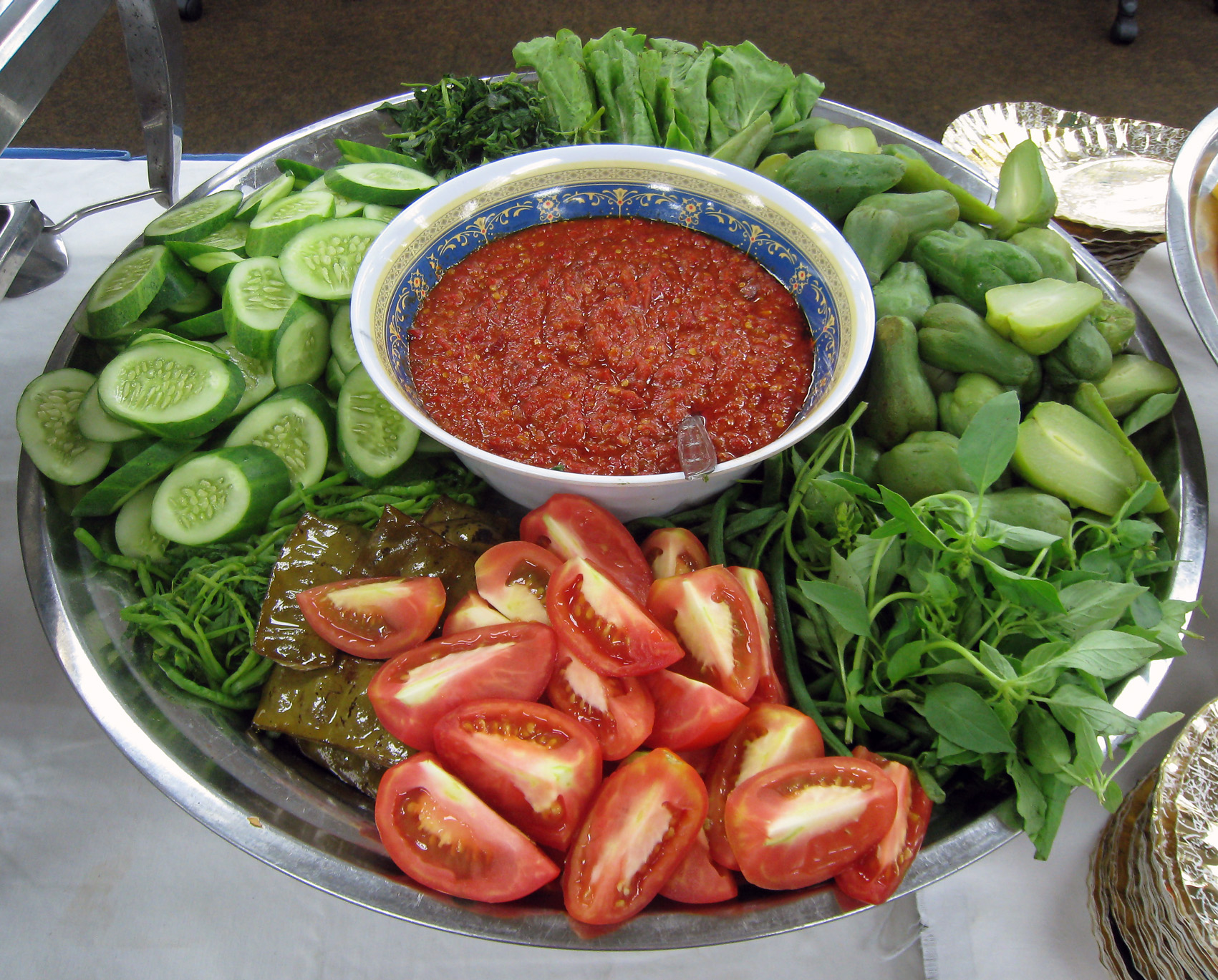
Sambal lalab

Sambal lalab
Sambal served with lalab (assorted of fresh vegetables), consumed as a dip dressing for salad. A Sundanese dish.

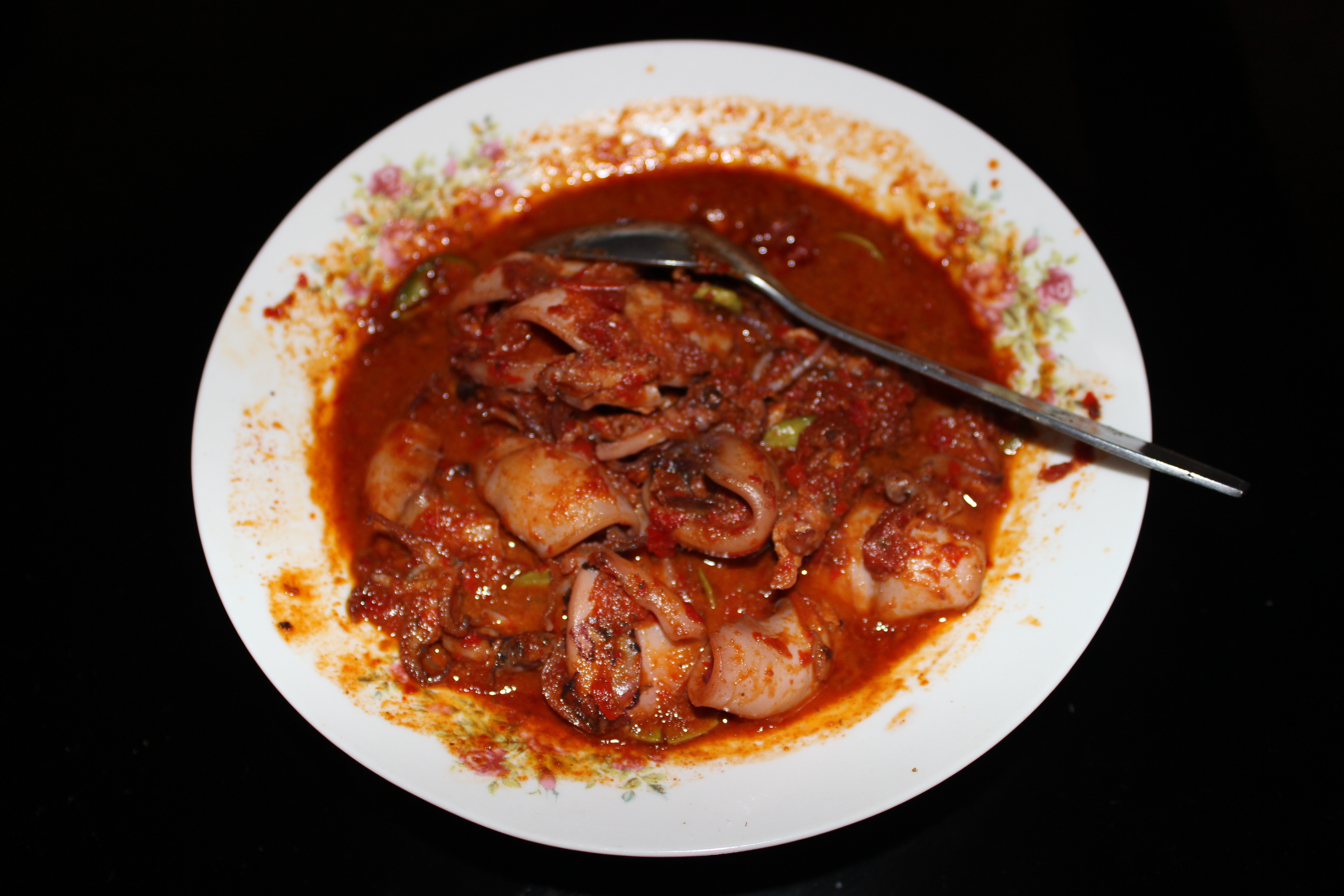
Sambal cumi with squid or cuttlefish

Sambal sotong or Sambal cumi
(with cuttlefish or squid)
Sambal udang kering
(with dried prawns), also known in Penang as "Sambal Hae Bee"
Sambal lengkong
(with ikan parang/wolf herring).
Sambal belut
(with eel). An Indonesian dish.
Sambal goreng ati
(with cow's or chicken liver, potato, and sometimes petai). An Indonesian dish.
Sambal goreng teri kacang
(with anchovy and peanuts). An Indonesian dish.
Sambal goreng kering tempe
(with tempeh). An Indonesian dish.
Sambal goreng krecek
(with cow or water buffalo skin cracker). A Javanese dish.

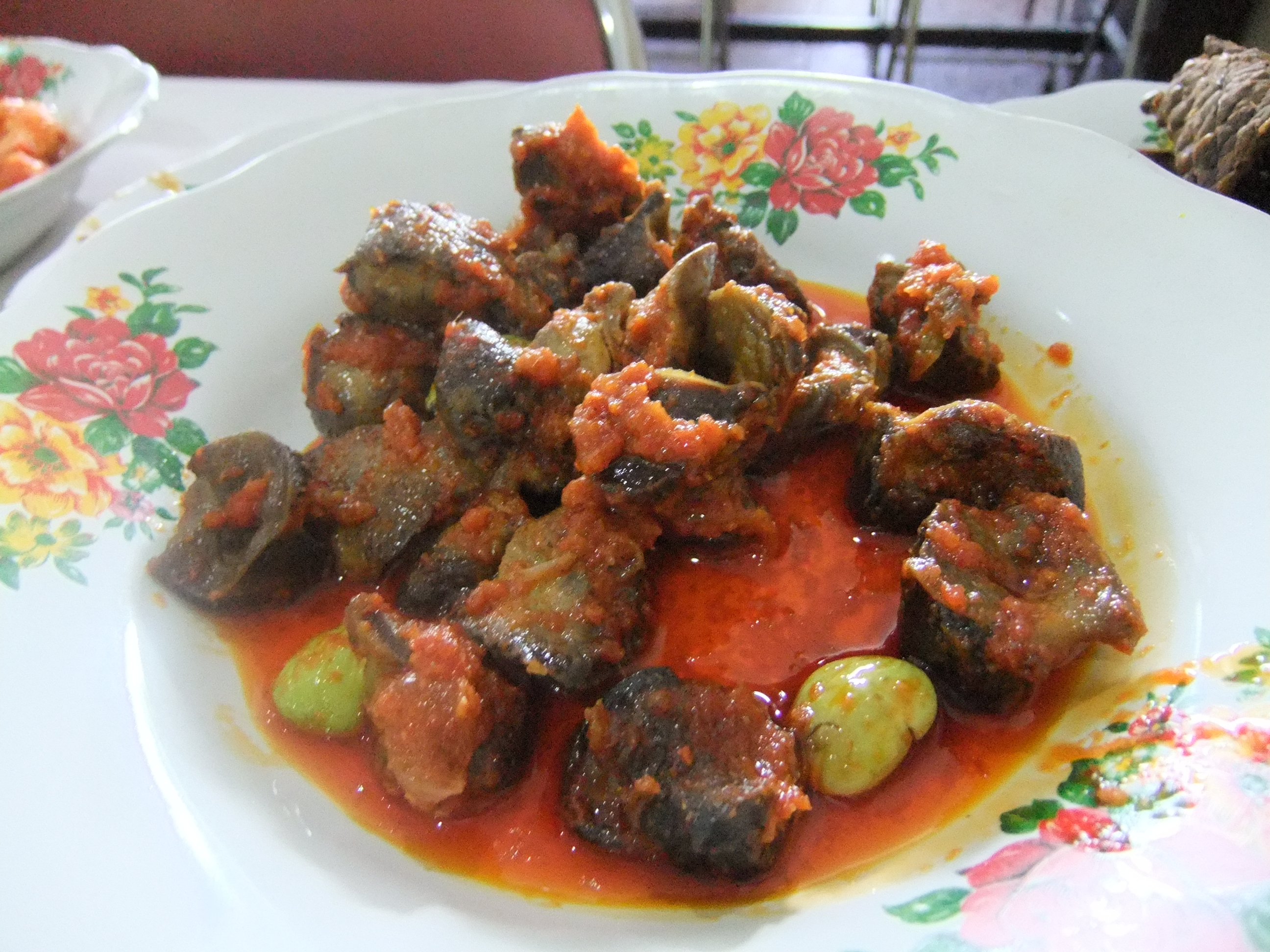
Sambal goreng ati, fried liver in sambal

Sambal goreng udang
or sambal shrimp (with fresh shrimp), also known as udang balado. A Minang dish.
Sambal jamur
(with oyster mushroom). An Indonesian dish.
Sambal radio
A traditional dish from Sarawak, it is an omelette mixed with fried belacan and anchovies.
Sambal ikan
A Malay-style dish prepared from fish and spices and cooked until the fish loses its shape. Available in varieties, some are in the shape of dry fish floss known as serunding ikan, and some are moist such as sambal ikan bilis (anchovies) or sambal ikan tongkol (skipjack tuna).
Sambal daging/serunding daging
A Malay style sambal prepared from meat and spices and cooked for more than 4 hours until the meat loses its shape, similar to meat floss.
Sambal stingray
A Malaysian/Singaporean seafood dish of barbecuing stingray served with sambal paste.
Sambal wader
A Javanese dish made of yellow rasbora and sambal terasi. It is believed to have been served since Majapahit era.
