= Thamrin 10 =

Park in Jakarta, Indonesia

Thaamrin 10 is food and creative park at Thamrin Avenue, Jakarta, Indonesia. It was opened in December, 2019. The place was actually a parking lot before transforming into the park. The park has a food court area, garden and stage for performance. The park is also used as a venue to arrange various festivals.

There are around 54 food and beverage outlets in Thamrin 10. The choices range from traditional to modern culinary delights. These include Soto Banjar, Pempek, Gudeg Jogja, Bakso, and others. Meanwhile, for drinks, there are coffee, Thai tea, dawet ice, and so on. Food court doesn't accept cash, only digital transaction. Thamrin 10 is open on weekdays from 10.00 to 22.00 WIB. Then for weeknd, the park is open from 10.00 to 00.00 WIB.

== See also ==
- Hawker centre
