= Brongkos =

Indonesian meat and bean stew

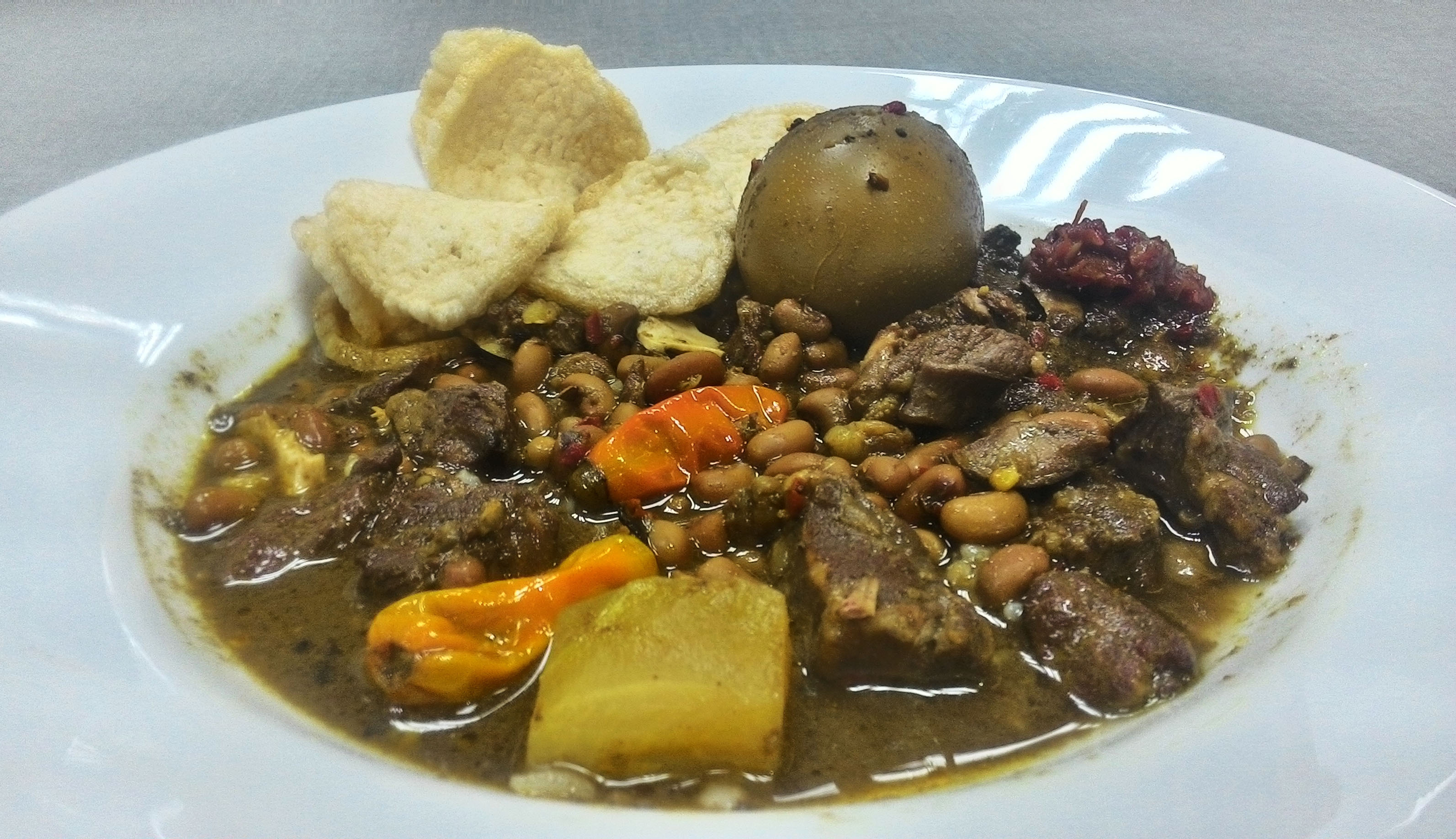
- A plate of brongkos, a spicy Javanese meat and bean stew.
- Course: Main course
- Place of origin: Indonesia
- Region or state: Yogyakarta, Central Java
- Serving temperature: Hot or room temperature
- Main ingredients: Black-eyed pea, meat (beef, goat meat or mutton), palm sugar, chili, kluwek, various spices, coconut milk, egg

Brongkos is a Javanese spicy meat and beans stew, specialty of Yogyakarta and other cities in Central Java, Indonesia.

Brongkos stew should not be confused with the similarly named brengkes—the Javanese name for pepes which is food cooked in banana leaf package.

== Ingredients ==
Brongkos consists of diced meat, either beef, goat meat, or mutton; a hard-boiled egg and tofu; stewed beans, usually black-eyed peas or red kidney beans; diced chayote; and sometimes carrots.

The coconut milk-based stews use a rich mixture of spices, which includes black kluwek, bruised lemongrass, kaffir lime leaves, bay leaves, salt, palm sugar, spice paste consists of ground galangal, kencur, ginger, coriander, shallot and roasted candlenut, also a whole of bird's eye chilies which add a surprising hot spiciness when bitten.

Brongkos often served together with steamed rice in a single plate as nasi brongkos (lit. "brongkos rice").

== History and popularity ==
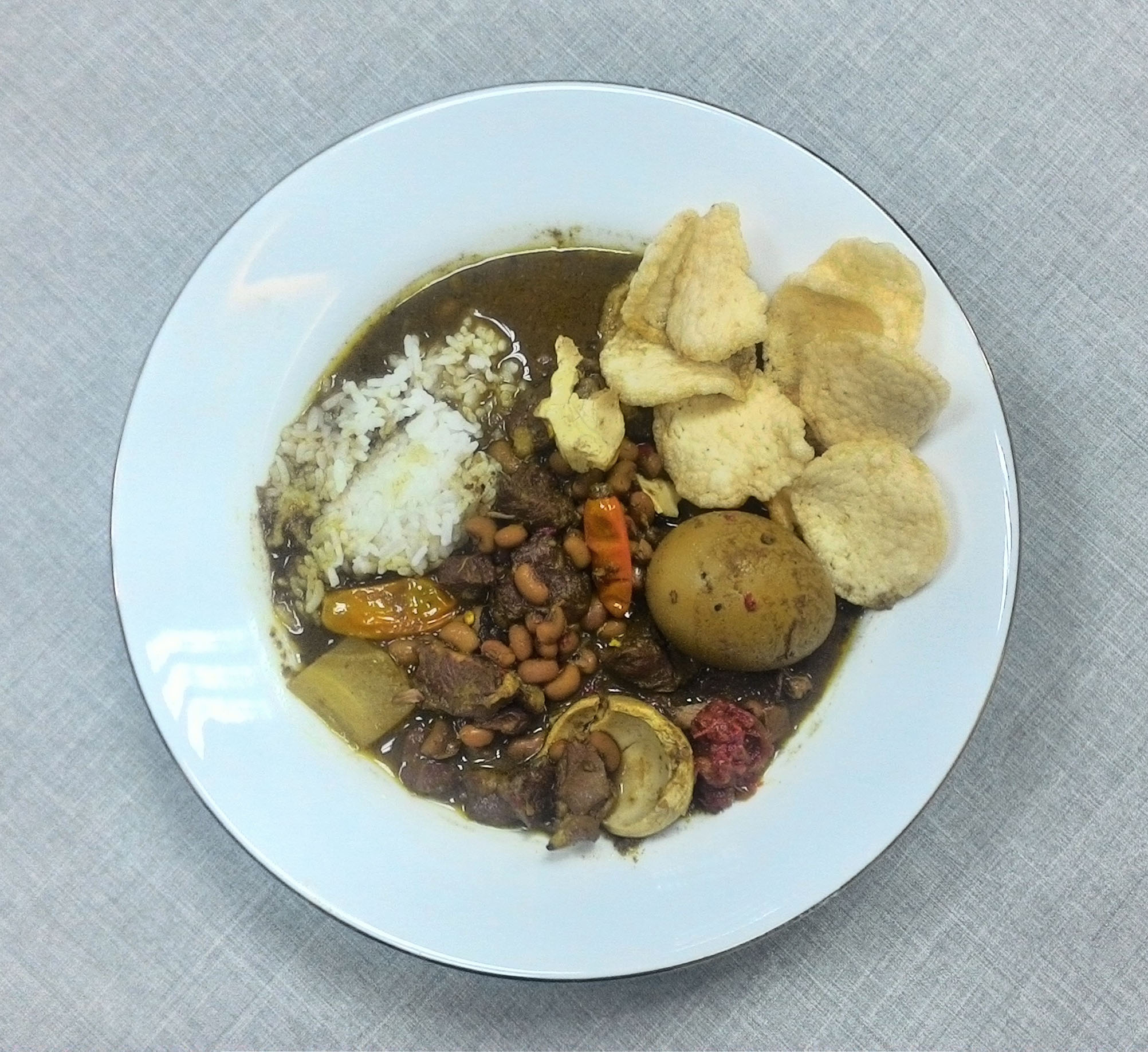
Nasi brongkos, brongkos stew with steamed rice and prawn cracker.

Brongkos, together with gudeg, sayur lodeh and rawon are considered as a classic Javanese dish. It is known as one of the royal dishes of the Kraton Yogyakarta, since it was said as the favourite dish of late Sultan Hamengkubuwono IX and his successor Sultan Hamengkubuwono X, thus subsequently offered in Bale Raos royal Javanese restaurant located within Yogyakarta palace compound and often served to the visiting royal guests.

Although brongkos is often associated with the city of Yogyakarta, this spicy meat and beans stew is quite widespread in Javanese tradition, especially in Central Java, as some cities has their own version and specialty, such as Demak, Solo, Magelang, and Temanggung.

== Etymology ==
The word “Brongkos” originally is from French, meaning “brownhorst,” which later became “Brongkos” in Java dialect meaning brown-meat food.

== See also ==
- Gudeg
- Rawon
- Brenebon
- Semur
- List of stews
