= Brengkes =

Javanese dish

Brengkes is a Javanese word that refers to a specific dish, i.e. a fish slathered with spices and wrapped in a banana leaf.

The most commonly used fish is a "pindang", which is a Javanese word for a fermented fish. Hence "brengkes pindang" is the most popular type of this dish. Peda (salted fish) can also be used.

== Etymology ==
The Javanese word "brengkes" is commonly used to refer to this dish. Some people call it "brengkesan" (brengkes, suffix -an) which actually means "the many types of brengkes".

Not to be confused with "brongkos", a very different dish from Java.

== Variants ==
There are different types of brengkes, like brengkes pindang, brengkes peda, brengkes godhong sembukan, and brengkes godhong pohung.

Brengkes has been introduced to other regions by Javanese diaspora or by colonial ties:

- Brengkes tempoyak (Palembang), where tempoyak sauce is used.
- Brengkes daoen poehoeng (Dutch). Daoen is an Indonesian word for leaf, while poehoeng (new romanized spelling: pohung) is a Javanese word for cassava.

== Similar dishes ==
- Pepes (Sundanese).
- Pesan, Tum (Balinese).
- Palai, paley (Sumatrans).
