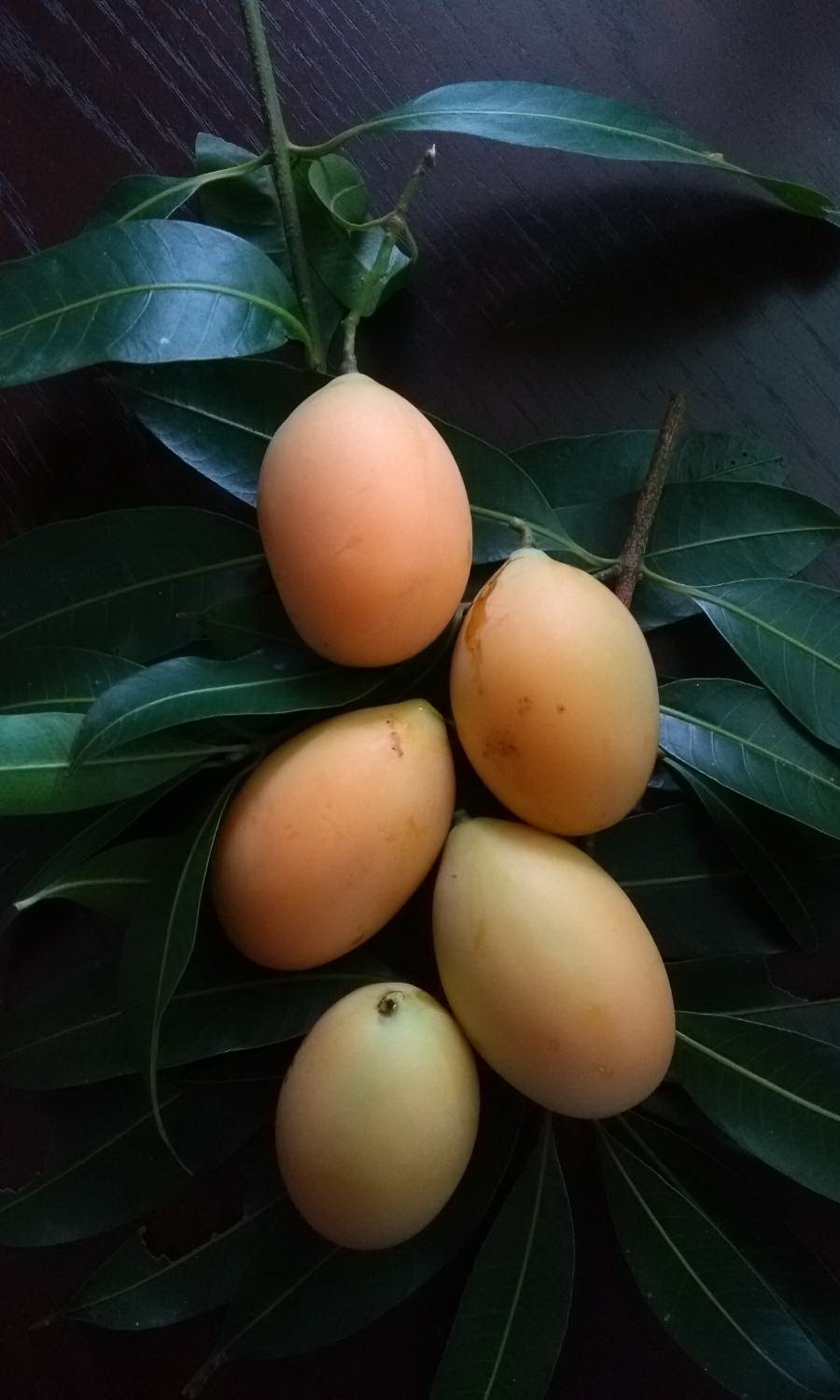

Conservation status
- Least Concern (IUCN 3.1)

Scientific classification
- Kingdom: Plantae
- Clade: Embryophytes
- Clade: Tracheophytes
- Clade: Spermatophytes
- Clade: Angiosperms
- Clade: Eudicots
- Clade: Rosids
- Order: Sapindales
- Family: Anacardiaceae
- Genus: Bouea
- Species: B. oppositifolia

Binomial name
- Bouea oppositifolia (Roxb.) Meisn.

Synonyms
- Bouea angustifolia Blume; Bouea brandisiana Kurz; Bouea burmanica Griff.; Bouea diversifolia Miq.; Bouea microphylla Griff.; Bouea myrsinoides Blume; Bouea oppositifolia var. microphylla (Griff.) Merr.; Cambessedea oppositifolia (Roxb.) Wight & Arn. ex Voigt; Haplospondias brandisiana (Kurz) Kosterm.; Haplospondias haplophylla (Airy Shaw & Forman) Kosterm.; Manga acida Noronha; Mangifera gandaria Roxb.; Mangifera oppositifolia Roxb.; Matpania laotica Gagnep.; Spondias haplophylla Airy Shaw & Forman

= Bouea oppositifolia =

Species of flowering plant

Bouea oppositifolia, also known as plum mango, kundang, kundangan or remenia, is a species of flowering plant, a fruit tree in the mango family, that is native to Indochina and Southeast Asia.

The tree and its fruit are commonly confused with the closely related Bouea macrophylla. B. macrophylla has lanceolate leaves and round yellow fruit, while B. oppositifolia has oblong leaves and oval red/yellow fruit.

== Description ==
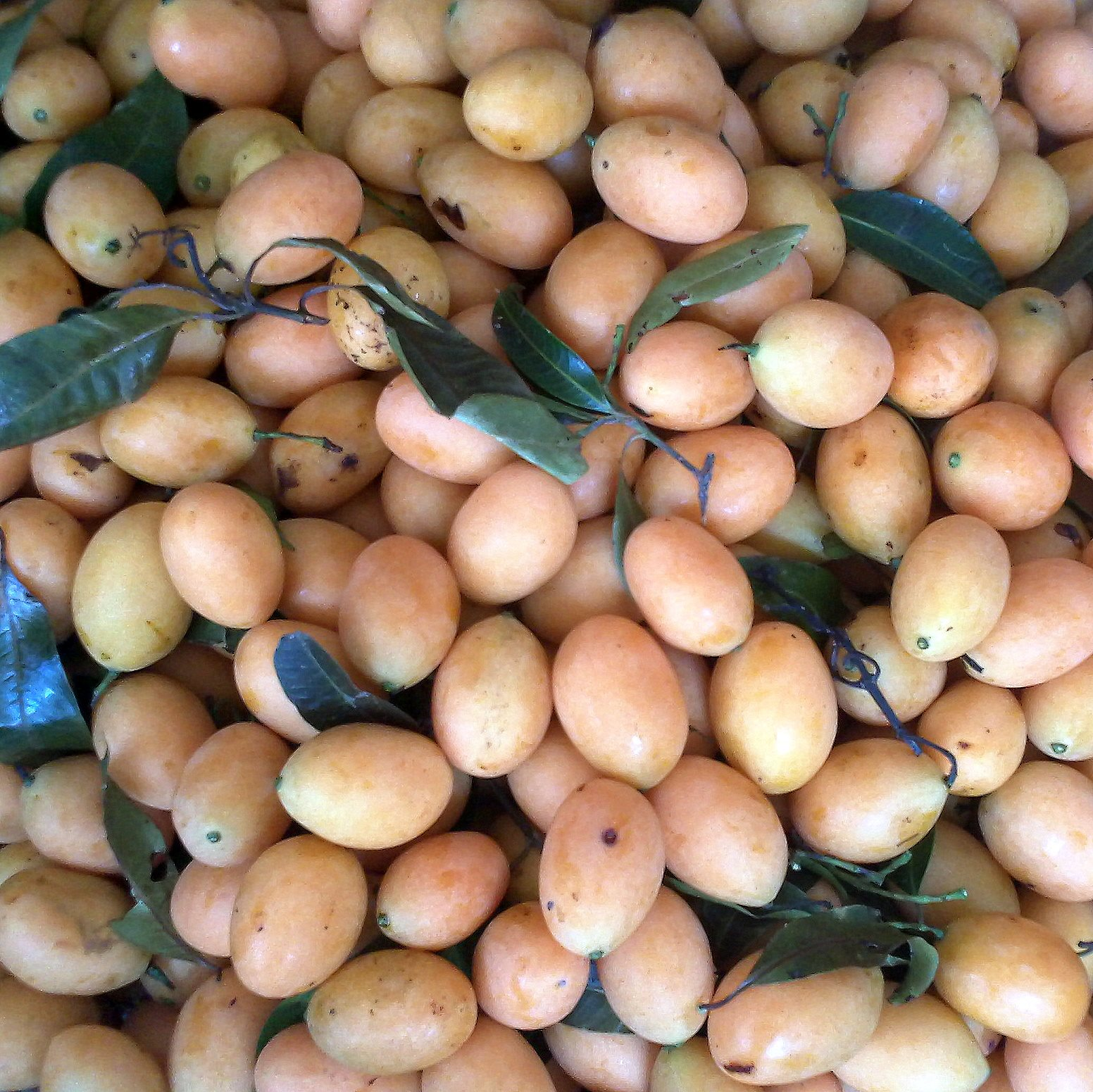
Ripe fruit' sold in Malaysia

The tree grows to 10–20 m (30–70 ft) in height with a short, low-branching bole and a dense rounded canopy. The oval leaves are smooth and leathery, 3–15 cm (1.2–5.9 in) long by 1.5–5 cm (0.6–2.0 in) wide. The inflorescences comprise clusters of small, white to pale yellow flowers at the leaf axils. The fruits are round to ovoid drupes 1.5–2.5 cm (0.6–1.0 in) long by 1–2.5 cm (0.4–1.0 in) wide, turning from yellow to orange or red when ripe. The seed is a 1–1.5 cm (0.4–0.6 in) stone with a fibrous endocarp and violet-purple cotyledons.

== Distribution and habitat ==
The species occurs from Myanmar and Indochina to the Malay Peninsula, Sumatra, Borneo and Sulawesi, where it is found in lowland mixed dipterocarp, coastal and peatswamp forests up to an elevation of 700 m (2,300 ft). It is also widely cultivated.
