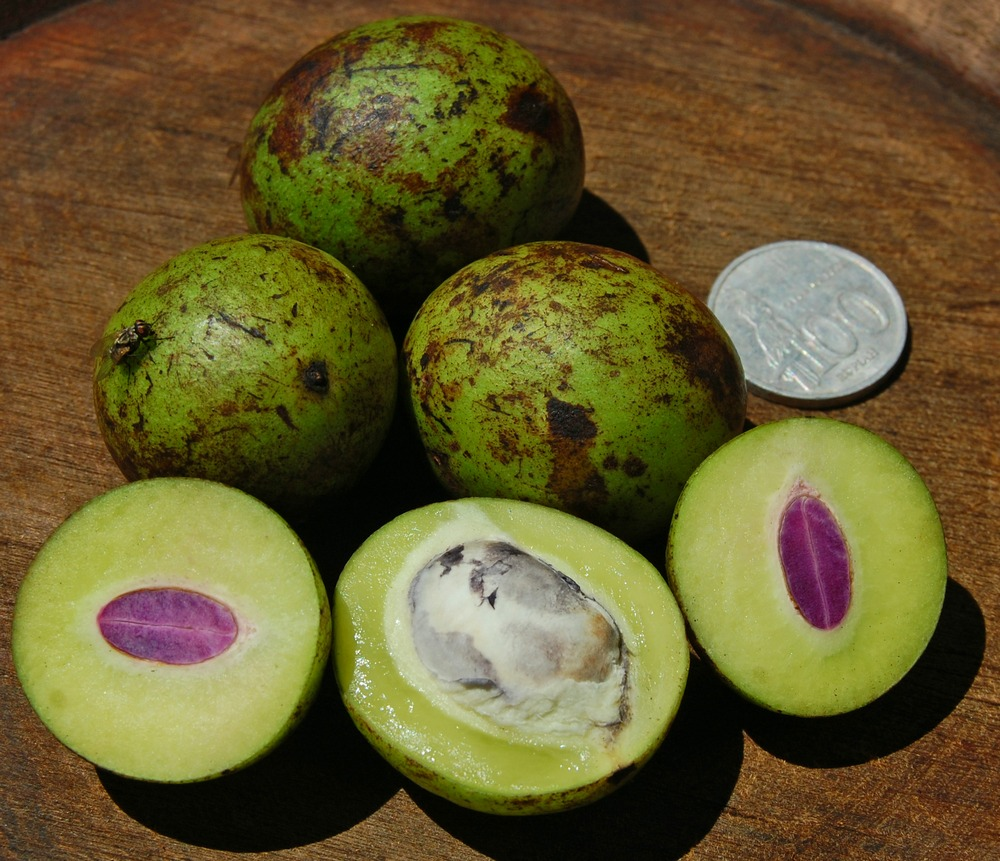
- fruit of B. macrophylla

Scientific classification
- Kingdom: Plantae
- Clade: Tracheophytes
- Clade: Angiosperms
- Clade: Eudicots
- Clade: Rosids
- Order: Sapindales
- Family: Anacardiaceae
- Subfamily: Anacardioideae
- Genus: Bouea; Meisn.

Synonyms
- Cambessedea Wight & Arn.; Haplospondias Kosterm.; Manga Noronha; Matpania Gagnep.; Tropidopetalum Turcz.

= Bouea =

Genus of trees

Bouea is an Asian genus of fruiting trees in the family Anacardiaceae. Species can be found in southern China, Indo-China and Malesia.

== Species ==
Plants of the World Online and the Catalogue of Life list:

- Bouea macrophylla Griff. (Thailand, Peninsular Malaysia, Sumatra, Java)
- Bouea oppositifolia (Roxb.) Meisn. - type species (throughout range)
- Bouea poilanei Evrard (Vietnam only)
