= Krechek =

Indonesian cattle skin spicy stew dish

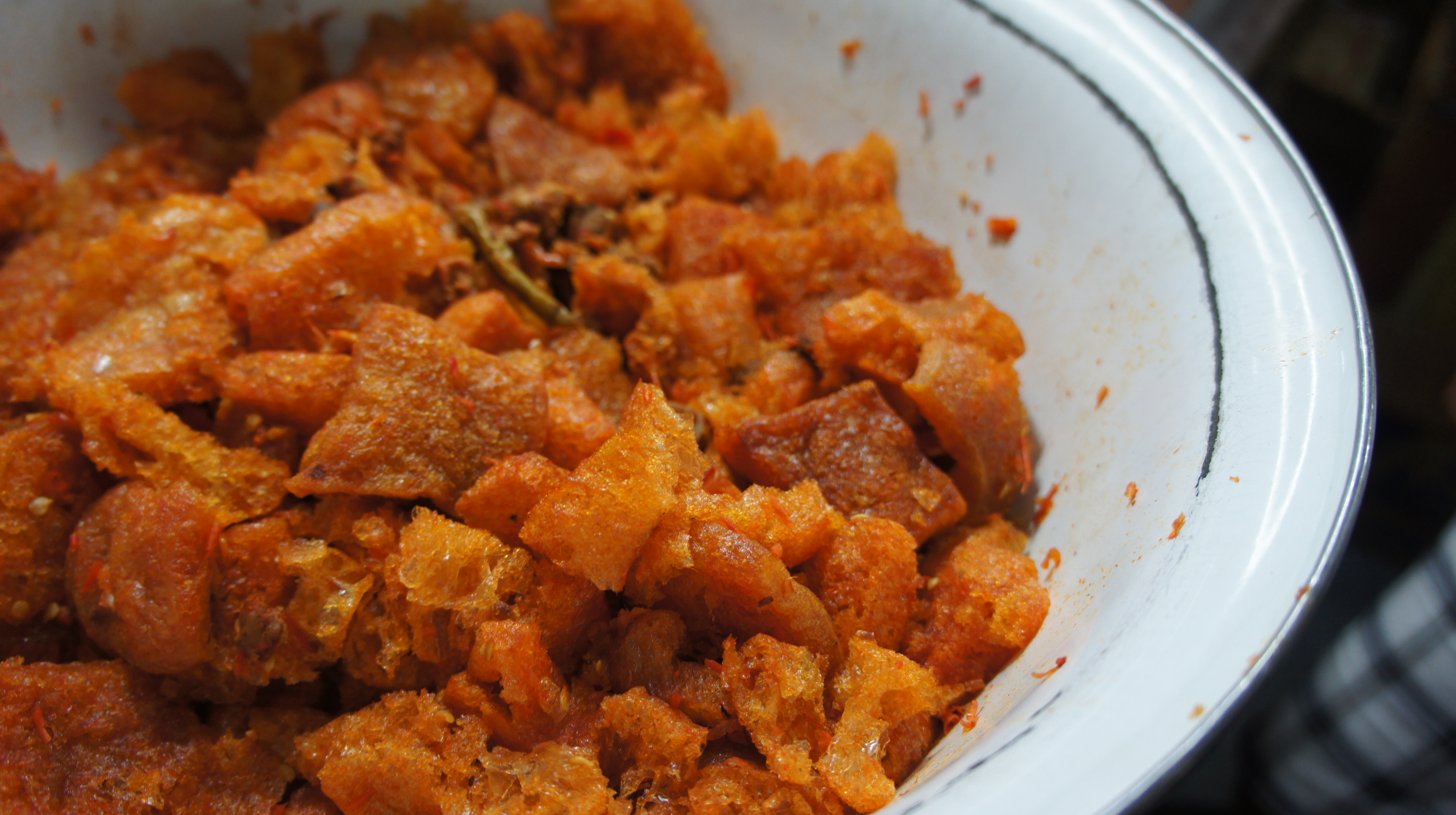
- Krechek served in Yogyakarta
- Alternative names: Krecek
- Course: Main course
- Place of origin: Indonesia
- Region or state: Yogyakarta, Central Java
- Serving temperature: Hot or room temperature
- Main ingredients: Rambak or krupuk kulit, potato and soybeans cooked in spicy coconut milk stew with chili peppers

Krechek or krecek (Javanese: ꦏꦿꦺꦕꦺꦏ꧀) or sambal goreng krechek is a traditional Javanese cattle skin spicy stew dish from Yogyakarta and Central Java, Indonesia. Traditionally it is made from the soft inner skin of cattle (cow or water buffalo), however, the most common recipe today uses readily available rambak or krupuk kulit (cattle skin crackers).

The rambak cracker is cooked in coconut milk-base stew, with diced potatoes and fried soybeans. It is mixed with bumbu (spice mixture) with plenty of red chili peppers. Because the skin crackers absorb coconut milk and spices, they become moist. Krechek has a soft and moist texture with a rich and spicy taste and reddish-orange color. Some recipes might add cow liver as sambal goreng hati krecek, while others might add diced tofu.

== Serving ==
Krechek is served with white steamed rice. It is often served as a side dish, part of nasi gudeg, nasi campur or nasi uduk set.

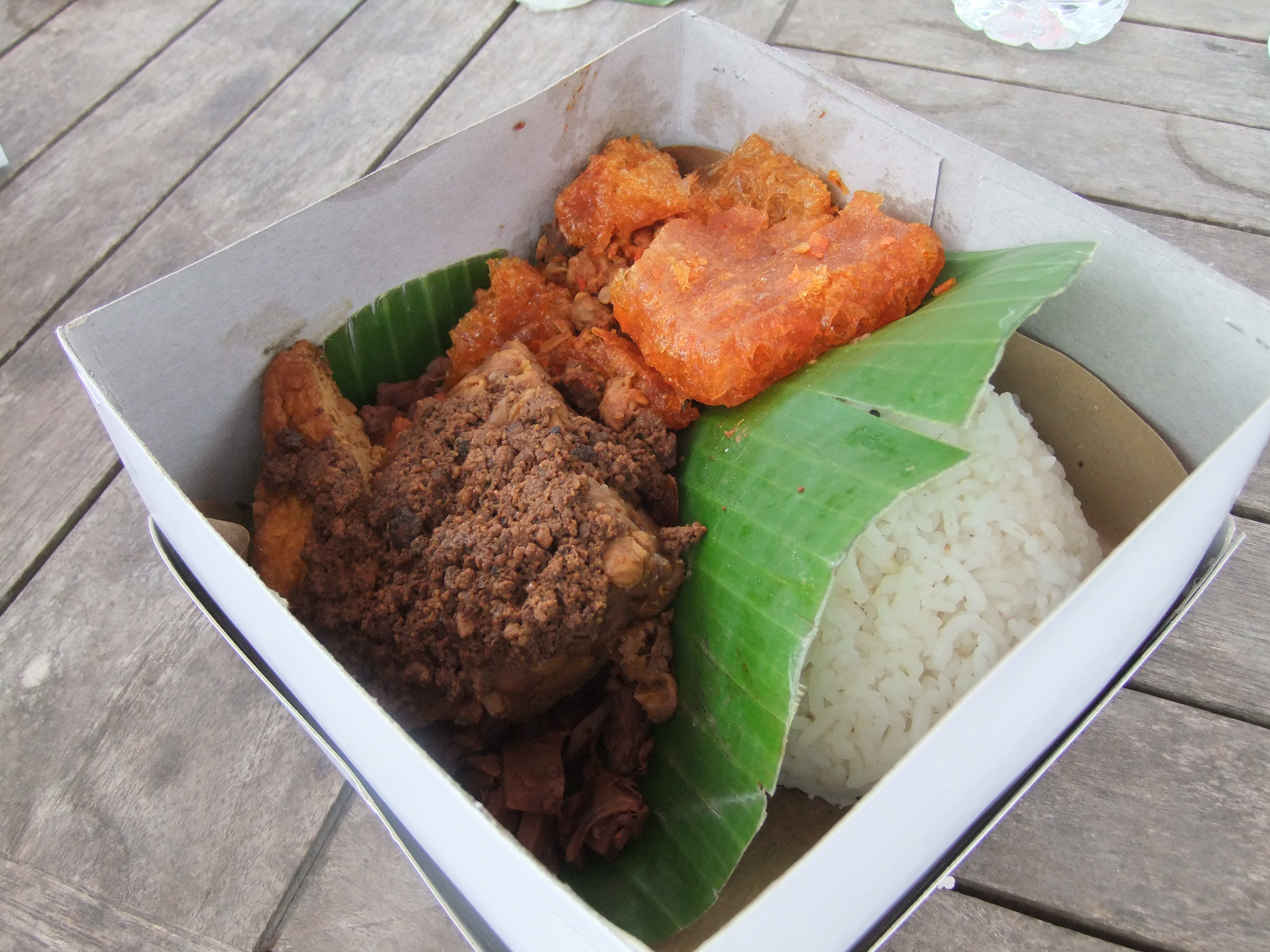
Krechek as part of nasi gudeg

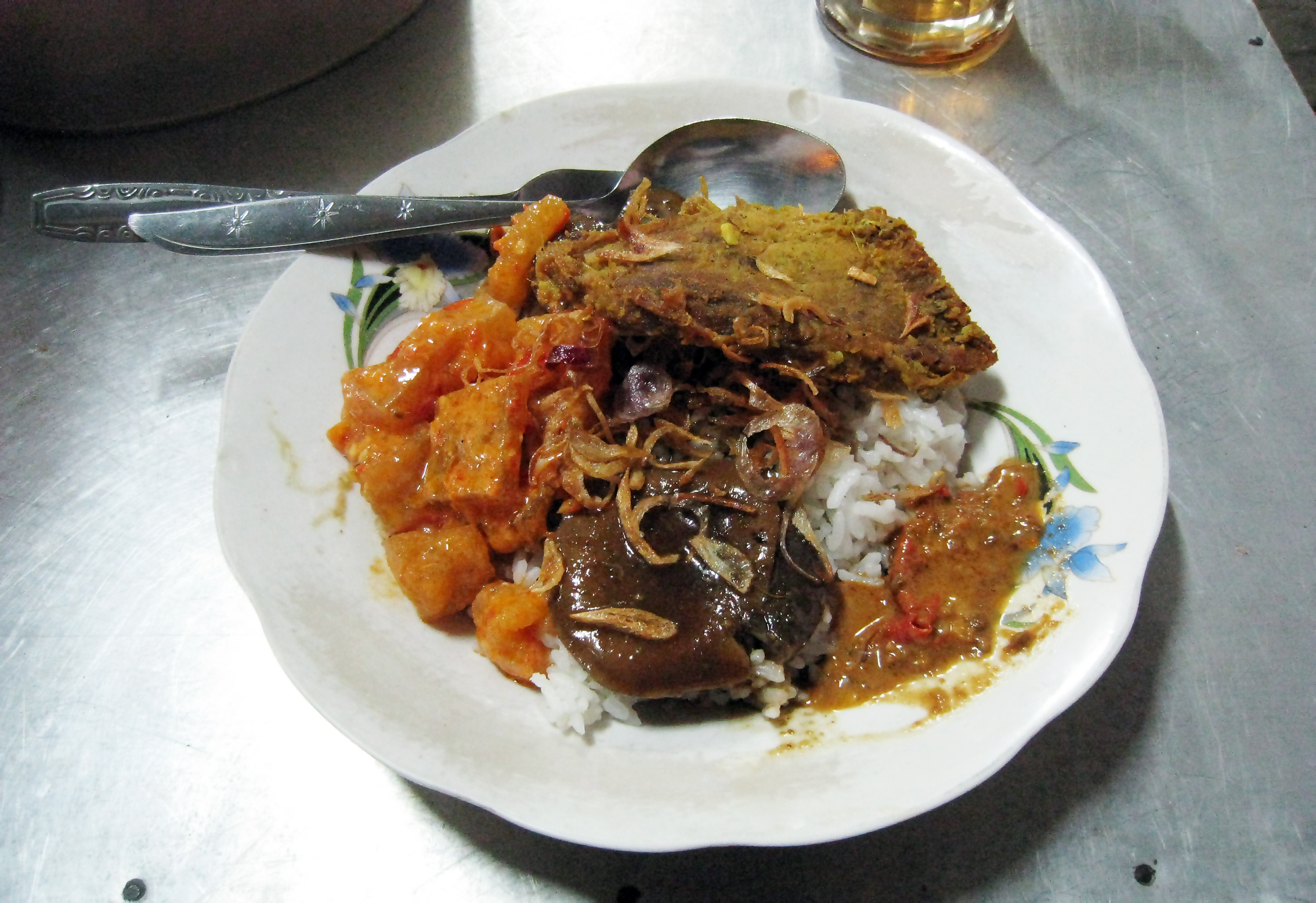
Krechek as part of nasi uduk

== See also ==
- Gudeg
- Nasi uduk
