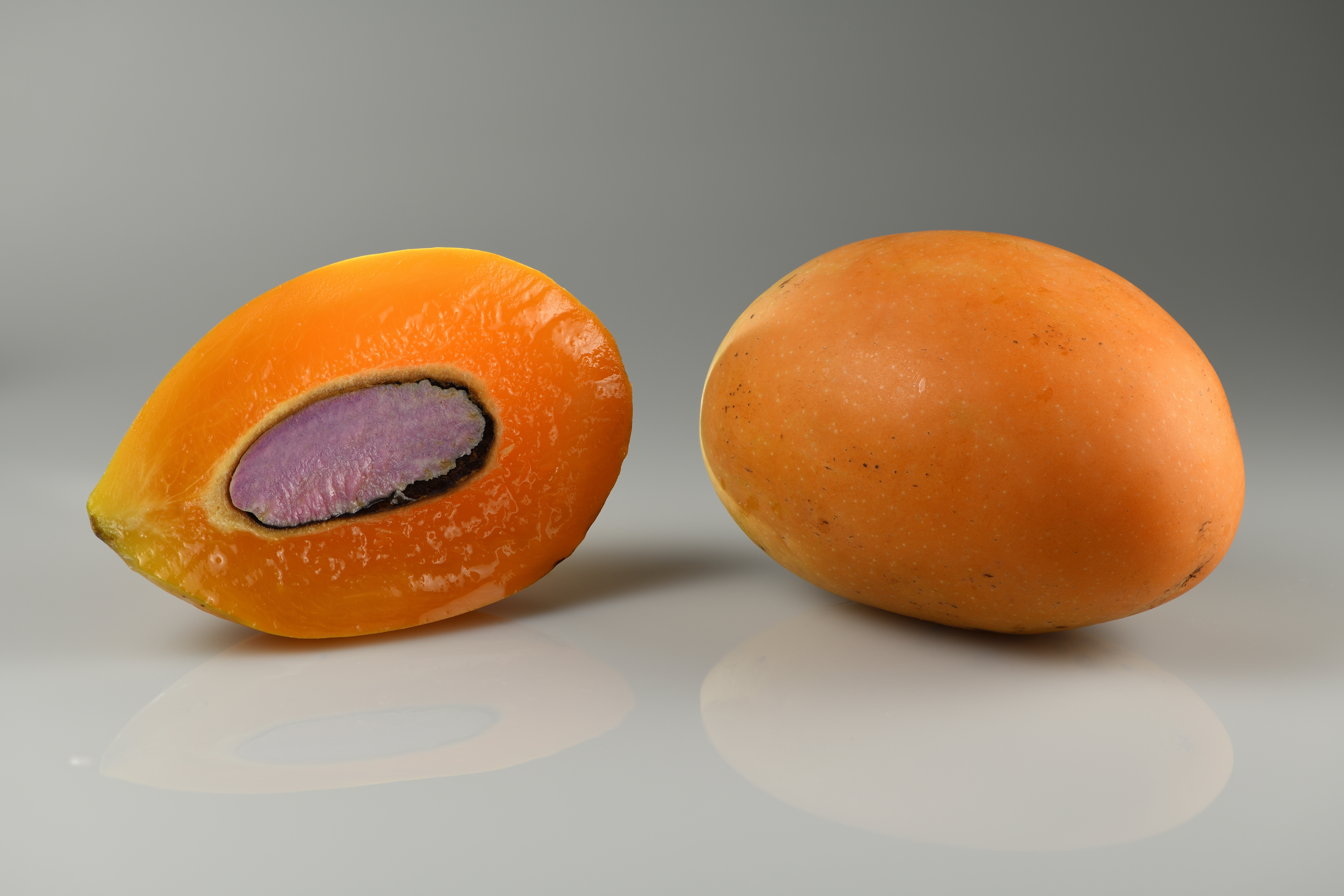
- Whole and halved fruit

Conservation status
- Least Concern (IUCN 3.1)

Scientific classification
- Kingdom: Plantae
- Clade: Embryophytes
- Clade: Tracheophytes
- Clade: Spermatophytes
- Clade: Angiosperms
- Clade: Eudicots
- Clade: Rosids
- Order: Sapindales
- Family: Anacardiaceae
- Genus: Bouea
- Species: B. macrophylla

Binomial name
- Bouea macrophylla Griff.

Synonyms
- Bouea gandaria Blume; Tropidopetalum javanicum Turcz.

= Bouea macrophylla =

Species of fruit and plant

Bouea macrophylla, commonly known as gandaria, Burmese plum, Marian plum, plum mango, mango plum or maprang in English, is a species of flowering plant native to Southeast Asia. The tree belongs to the family Anacardiaceae which also includes mango and cashew.

The tree and its fruit are commonly confused with the closely related Bouea oppositifolia, both of which show considerable morphological variation. B. macrophylla has long lanceolate leaves and round yellow fruit, while B. oppositifolia has shorter oblong leaves and oval red/yellow fruit.

== Description ==
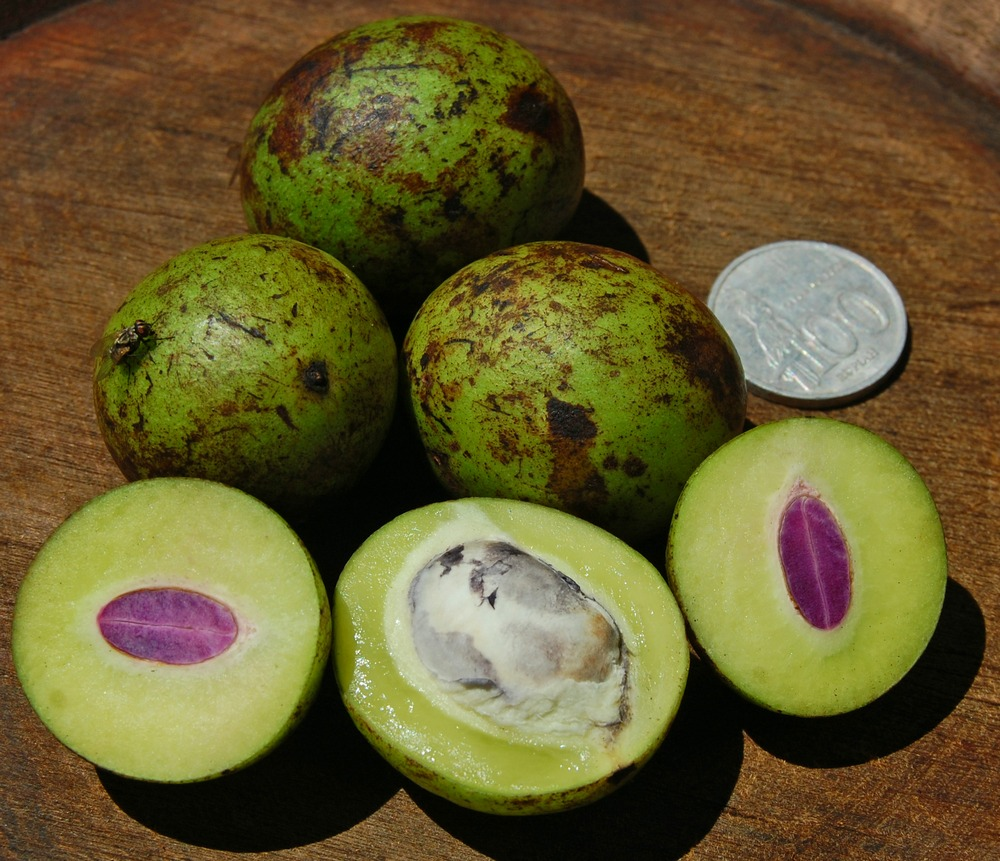
Unripe fruits in Java. Ripened ones are yellow-orange.

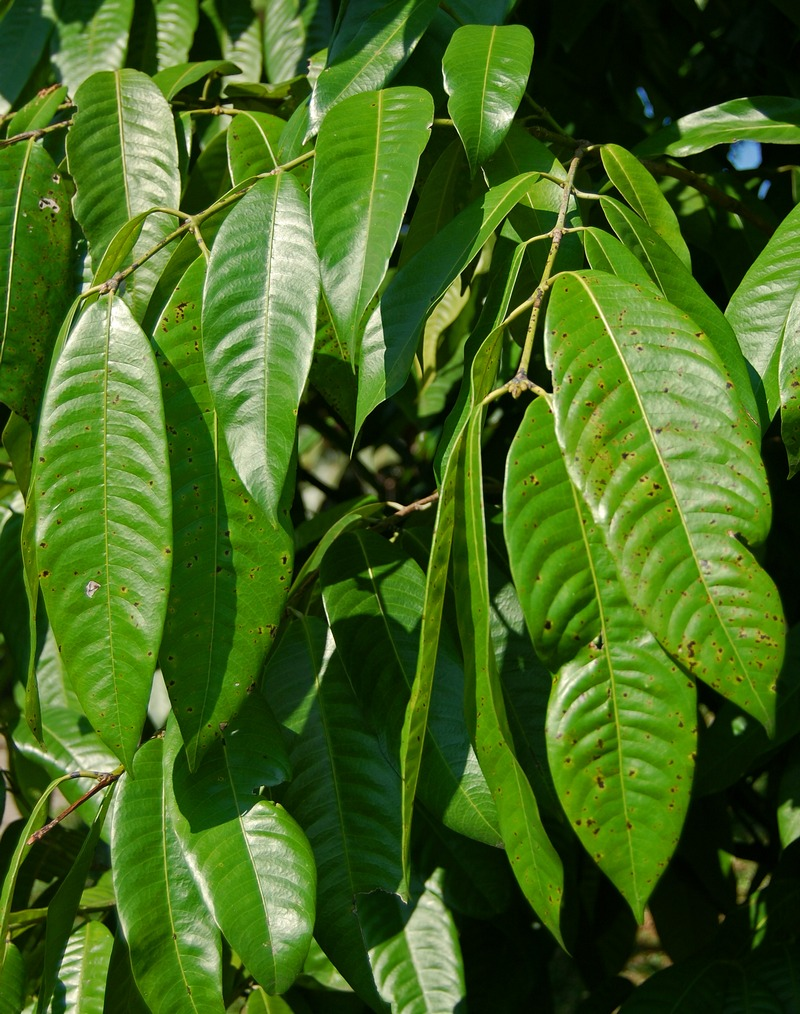
Gandaria leaf in Java

The evergreen tree grows to heights of 25 meters. Its leaves are lanceolate to elliptic in shape (see: Leaf shape), and range from 13 to 45 cm (5 to 17 inches) long and from 5 to 7 cm (2 to 3 inches) wide.

The unripe fruit (resembling a mango) is green in colour and matures to an orange/yellow, with the seed being pink. Fruits grow to roughly 2 to 5 cm (0.7 to 1.9 inches) in diameter. The entire fruit, including its skin is edible. The fruit range from sweet to sour in flavor similar to the Alphonso mango, and have a light smell of turpentine. When ripe, the fruit is soft and has fibrous mango-like seeds that have a noticeable purple color.

Flowering and fruiting times differ for Thailand and Indonesia. In Thailand, it typically flowers in November to December, and fruit appears from April to May. While in Indonesia, it flowers in June to November, and fruit appears from March to June. However, in some regions in Indonesia, the fruiting season starts at the beginning of the rainy season.

Bouea macrophylla can take 10-15 years from planting time to harvest, with a productive life of over 30 years. Propagation is done by seed only.

== Distribution ==
The tree is native to Indonesia, and Burma. It is also found in Thailand, Laos, and Malaysia, where it is commercially grown. It can also be found in the northern parts of Pakistan (such as Murree and Nathia Gali).

In Indonesia, the main areas of production are in wet, humid areas in North Sumatra and West Java.

== Uses ==
=== Culinary ===
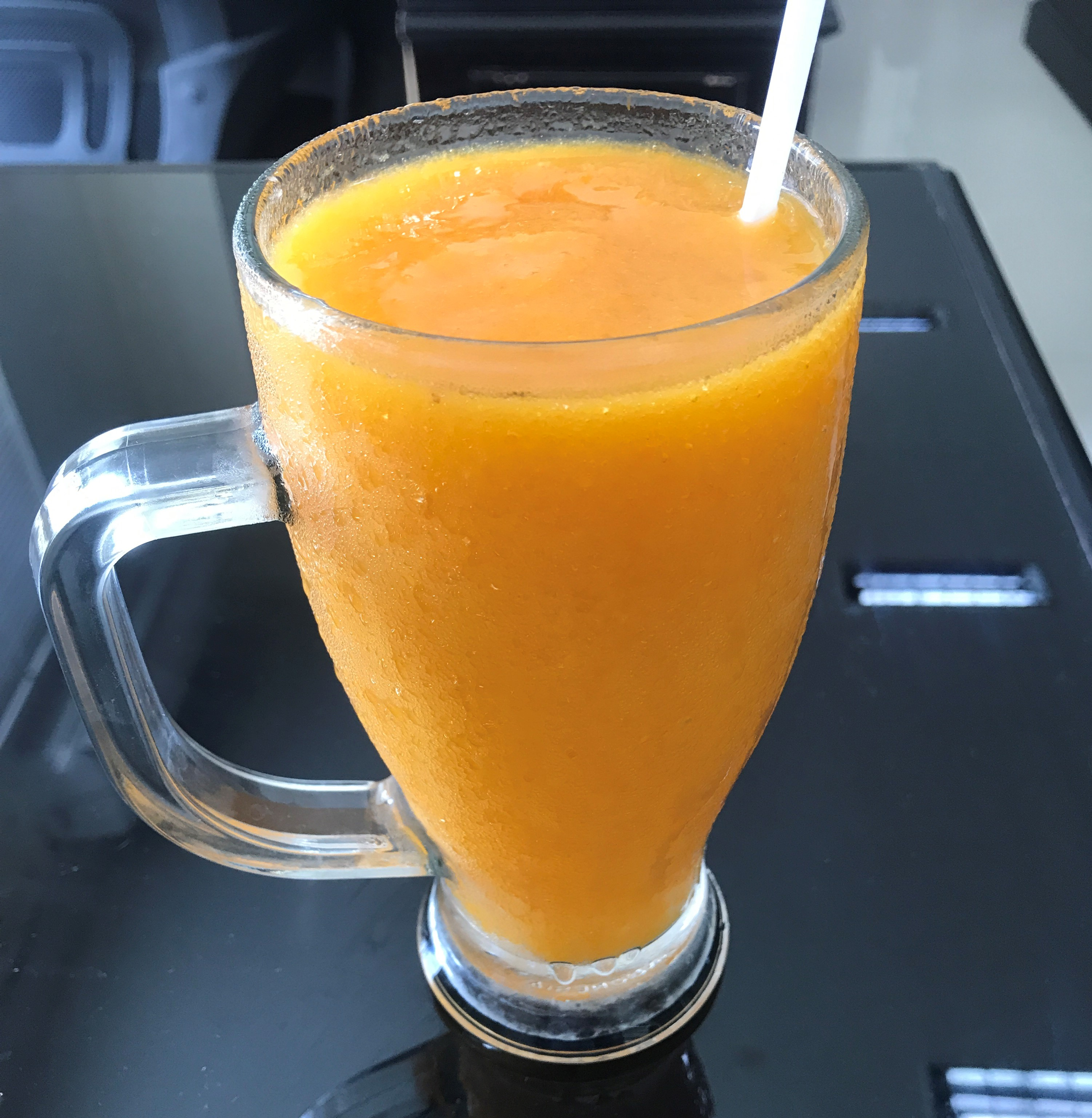
Jus gandaria, mango plum juice consumed in Indonesia

Both the leaves and fruit from the tree can be eaten. The leaves can be eaten raw when they are still young, and can be used in salads. While the seed is edible, the endosperm is generally bitter. The fruit is very acidic and has a mango-like flavour. It can be eaten raw, or made into dishes such as pickle, compote, or sambal. Unripened fruit can be used to make rojak and asinan. In Ambon, the fruit is made for juice.

=== Functional ===
The entire tree can be used as an ornamental fruit bearing shade tree due to its dense foliage.

== Other names ==
Bouea macrophylla is commonly known in English as the "marian plum", "gandaria", "plum mango" and "mango plum". In Malay, the tree is known as kundang in Malay and its fruit buah kundang. The Malays differentiate between two varieties:

- Kundang daun kecil ("small-leaf kundang") also known as remia, remnia or rumenia. This usually refers to Bouea oppositifolia.
- Kundang daun besar ("large-leaf kundang"), also known as kundang hutan ("jungle kundang) or pokok setar. This is the origin of the toponym Alor Setar (with alor meaning "small stream").

In Indonesian, it is known as ramania and gandaria. It is also known in Thai as maprang (มะปราง), mayong (มะยง) and mayong chit (มะยงชิด). In Burmese as mayan-thi (မရန်းသီး); and in Vietnamese as thanh trà.

In 2015 a major retailer introduced the fruit to the British public under the name plango, apparently a portmanteau word for "plum" and "mango". At the time the announcements noted the resemblance of the fruit to plums and mangoes, and some of the local press deliberately or naively announced that the fruit was a cross between a plum and a mango, which is not botanically plausible as plums and mangoes are not in the same family.
