= Gudeg =

Traditional Indonesian dish

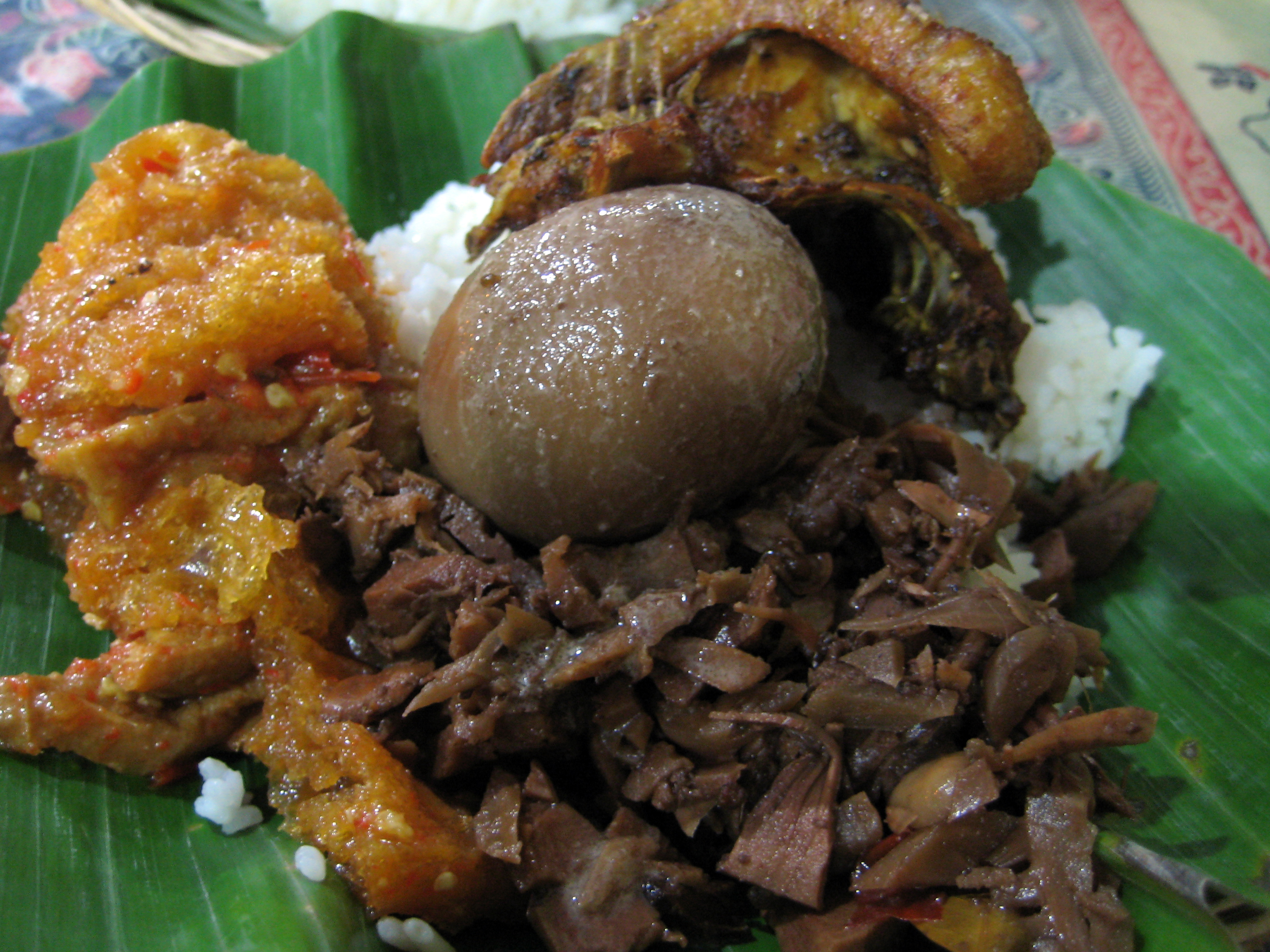
- A typical serving of gudeg
- Course: Main course
- Place of origin: Indonesia
- Region or state: Yogyakarta, Central Java
- Serving temperature: Hot or room temperature
- Main ingredients: Young jackfruit, coconut milk, palm sugar, chili, various spices, chicken, egg, tempeh
- Variations: Dry gudeg, solo gudeg, gudeg putih

Gudeg is a traditional Javanese dish from Yogyakarta, Indonesia. It is made from young, unripe jackfruit (gori, nangka muda) stewed for several hours with palm sugar and coconut milk. It is variously spiced with garlic, shallot, candlenut, coriander seed, galangal, bay leaves, and teak leaves, the latter giving the dish a reddish-brown color. It is sometimes called "green jack fruit sweet stew".

== Serving ==
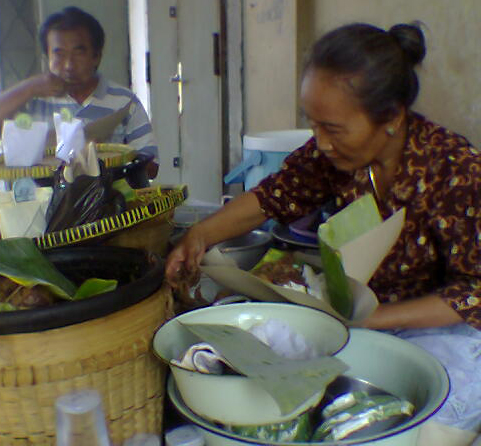
A woman selling gudeg at a street stall in Surakarta, Indonesia

Served on its own, gudeg can be considered vegetarian food, since it only consists of unripe jackfruit and coconut milk. However, the dish commonly includes egg or chicken. Gudeg is served with white steamed rice; chicken, either as opor ayam (chicken in coconut milk) or ayam goreng (fried chicken); hard-boiled egg; tofu and/or tempeh; and sambel goreng krechek, a stew made of crisp beef skin.

== Availability and packaging ==
Gudeg can be packed into a besek (box made from bamboo) or kendil (clay jar), or canned. Canned gudeg can last up to one year.

Warung and restaurants serving gudeg can be found throughout Indonesian cities, and the dish is also available in neighboring countries, such as Singapore and Malaysia.

== See also ==
- Javanese cuisine
- Brongkos
