= Nasi gemuk =

Indonesian rice dish

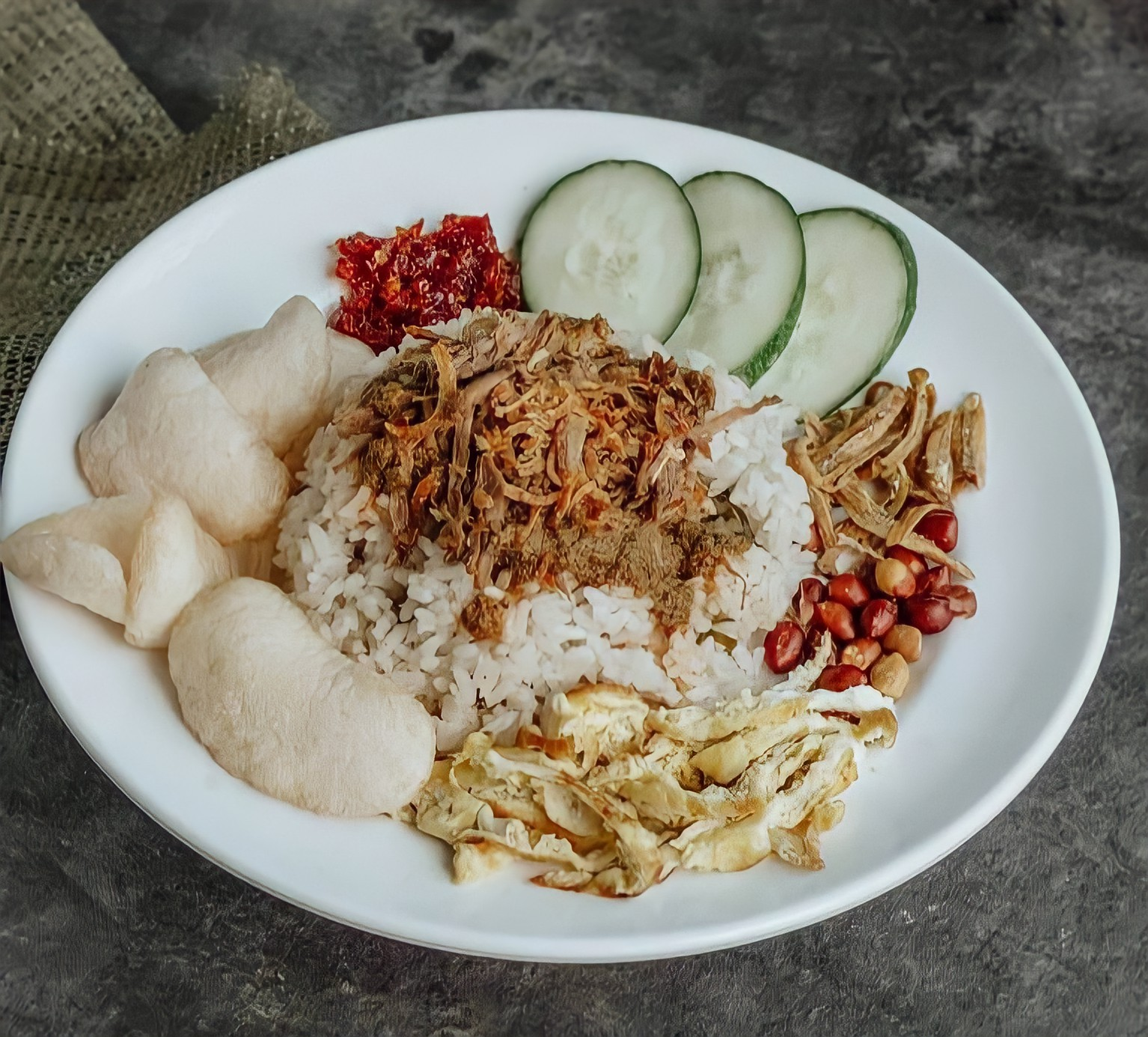
- Course: Main
- Place of origin: Indonesia
- Region or state: Jambi and Palembang
- Main ingredients: Rice cooked in coconut milk served with egg, anchovy, tempeh, peanuts, and cucumber
- Other information: Usually served for breakfast

Nasi gemuk is a rice dish cooked with coconut milk and pandan leaf which is one of typical dish of Jambi and Palembang, Indonesia. Aromatic spices used include lemongrass and daun salam (Indonesian bay leaf).

This food can be found throughout the province of Jambi and also in the city of Palembang. Nasi gemuk is usually served as a breakfast fare.

Among the people of Jambi, this dish is usually served for special celebrations, for example at thanksgiving celebrations that mark the khataman or the completion of the Quran recitation.

In the city of Palembang, nasi gemuk is also commonly found as a local variation of the coconut milk rice dish. Along with nasi minyak, burgo, and lakso, this savory rice dish is also often served for breakfast.

== Etymology ==
Nasi gemuk in Jambi and Palembang Malay dialects literally translate to "fat rice". It refer to the ample amount of coconut milk which after being heated during cooking process would turn into a fatty and oily liquids that seeped into and enrichen the rice. Other than "fat", the term gemuk can be perceived in other contexts, either as "rich", "creamy" or "savoury". In Jambi Malay and Palembang Malay, gemuk is a synonym of lemak in common Malay language. Both terms means "rich" or "creamy", which refer to rice cooked with coconut milk, so that the texture is soft and the flavour is savoury.

== Accompany dishes ==
Nasi gemuk Jambi is usually served with pieces of omelette or boiled egg, anchovies, fried peanuts, sliced cucumber, bawang goreng (fried shallot), and sambal chili sauce with a distinctive taste.

Side dishes for nasi gemuk Palembang include fried anchovies, sambal chili sauce, omelettes or boiled eggs, and fried peanuts. Sometimes other side dishes of beef, fish or chicken are also added. This Palembang version is not usually served with beef rendang, but is served with a local dish of spiced beef stew called malbi.

== History ==
Nasi gemuk, has been a popular breakfast dish for a long time in Jambi city. The reason for giving the name nasi gemuk is because the rice is oily and uses large amounts of coconut milk, even more than nasi uduk.

In Palembang however, nasi gemuk initially was considered as a special dish, only served for celebrative events such as sadaqah (almsgiving), syukuran, or especially khatam turutan celebration, which marked the completion of Quran recital among women, or Juz Amma completion among children. The mothers were proudly prepare nasi gemuk to be taken to the local small mosque (surau or langgar), prayed doa by the Quran teacher, and consumed together afterwards.

Other than become a popular breakfast food item, in Jambi this dish is also served for special events, for example the khataman ceremony marking the completion of the Quran recitation.

Since 2012, this traditional food has been acknowledged and recorded by the Directorate of Cultural Heritage and Diplomacy as one of the Indonesian Intangible Cultural Heritage originating from Jambi province.

== Similar dishes ==
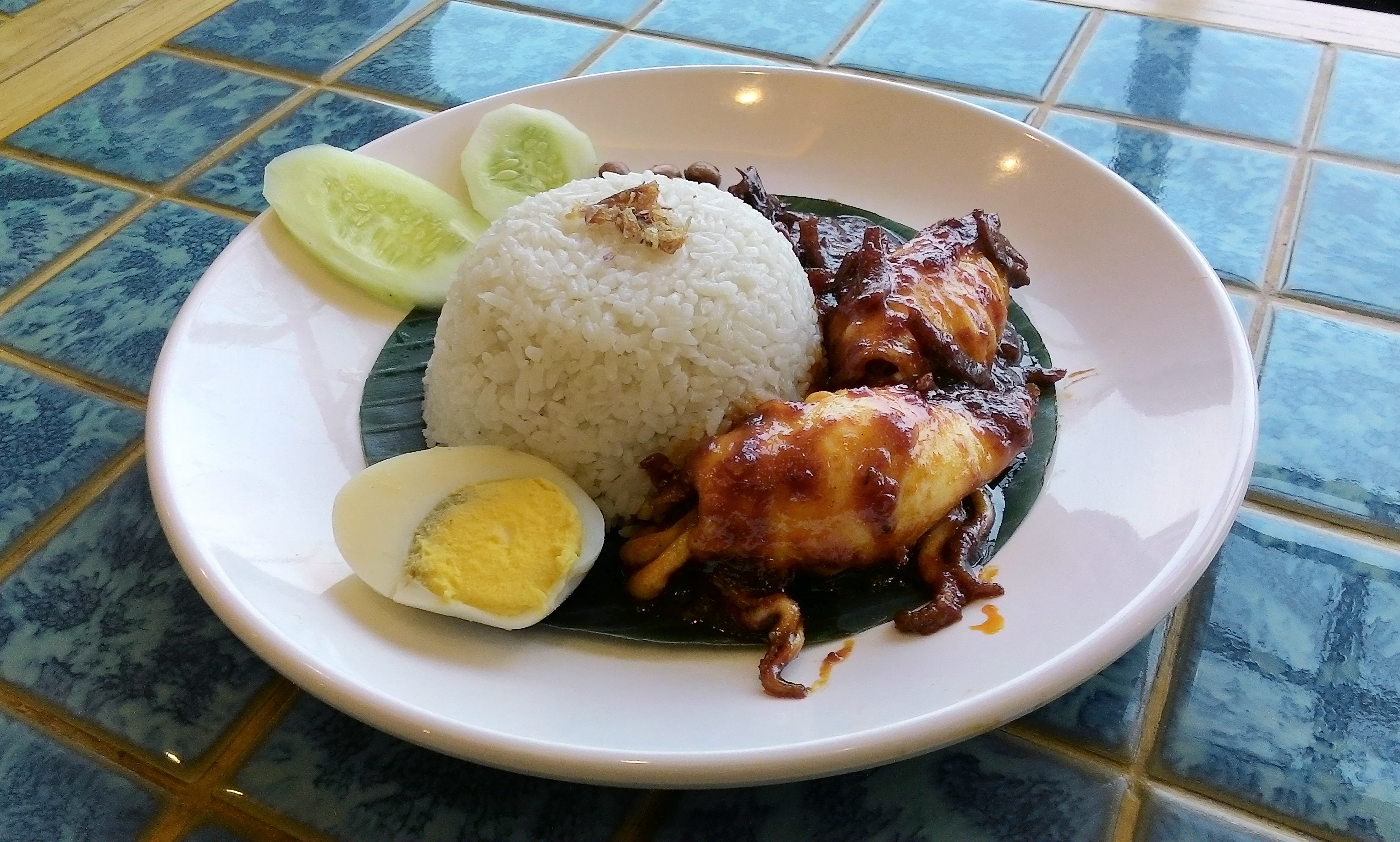
Nasi lemak from neighbouring province of Riau Islands, the closest analogue to Jambi's nasi gemuk

In terms of flavour, nasi gemuk is quite similar to Betawi nasi uduk, Acehnese nasi gurih, and the popular nasi lemak which is usually found in the neighbouring Riau Islands and Riau provinces in Sumatra, as well as in Malaysia and Singapore.

The thing that differentiates nasi gemuk and nasi lemak is the side dishes and the type of sambal chili sauce being used. Nevertheless, indeed nasi lemak is nasi gemuk's closest analogue. It is arguably that the difference is only due to dialects variant, in which the term lemak in Johor and Riau Malay dialect is synonymous with gemuk in Jambi and Palembang Malay dialect.

== See also ==
- Nasi lemak
- Nasi uduk
- Nasi gurih
