= Palembang cuisine =

Cuisine of the people of Palembang

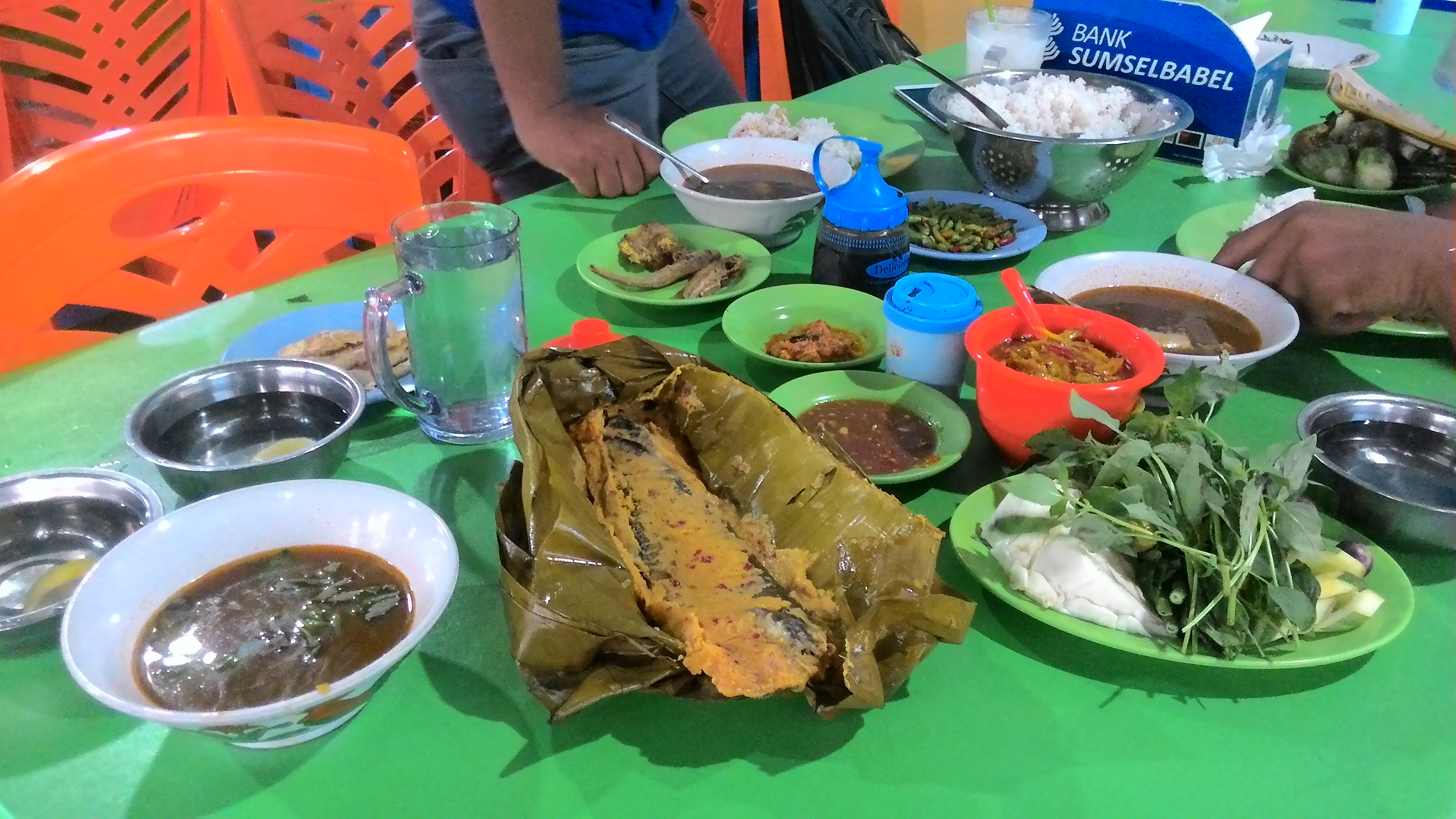
Palembang typical traditional cuisine; pindang iwak baung, brengkes, tempoyak, iwak lais, sambal buah with young mango, sambal tempoyak, salted fish, sour sambal, and lalab (ulam) vegetables, served in a traditional restaurant in Palembang.

Palembangese cuisine is the cuisine of the Palembangese people of the city of Palembang in the South Sumatra province of Indonesia. It is the second most well-known cuisine from Sumatra after Padang.

== Ingredients ==
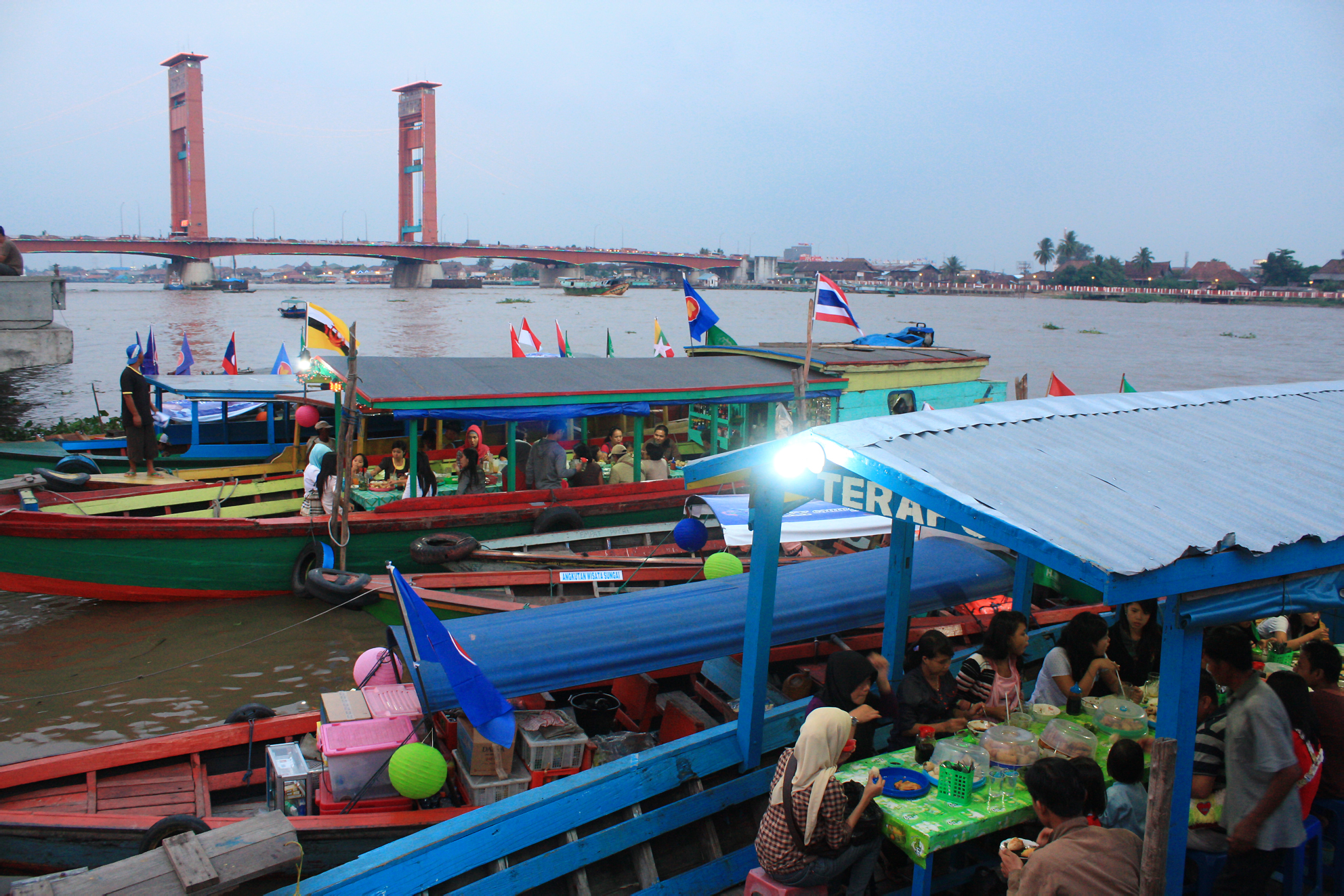
Floating warung boat attached to the bank of Musi river, Palembang, selling local favourite such as pempek. Palembang cuisine rely extensively on Musi's freshwater fisheries.

Palembang cuisine primarily uses freshwater fish and prawns as key ingredients due to the paramount role of the Musi River for the area. Popular freshwater fish includes patin (Pangasius), baung (Hemibagrus), lais (Kryptopterus cryptopterus), lele (catfish), gabus (snakehead), mas (carp) and gurame (gourami). Historically, Palembang waters were teeming with belido (giant featherback), and it has become the city's official animal mascot. It is valued for its succulent flavour and soft texture. However, due to overfishing, today the belido fish are scarce and probably already extinct in Musi river area.

Because of its location that is not far from the sea, seafood such as shrimp, tenggiri (wahoo), kakap merah (red snapper) and Spanish mackerel are also popular in Palembang.

Besides freshwater fish dishes, there are many variations of dishes, snacks, drinks, and sweets in Palembang cuisine.

== Spices and flavouring ==
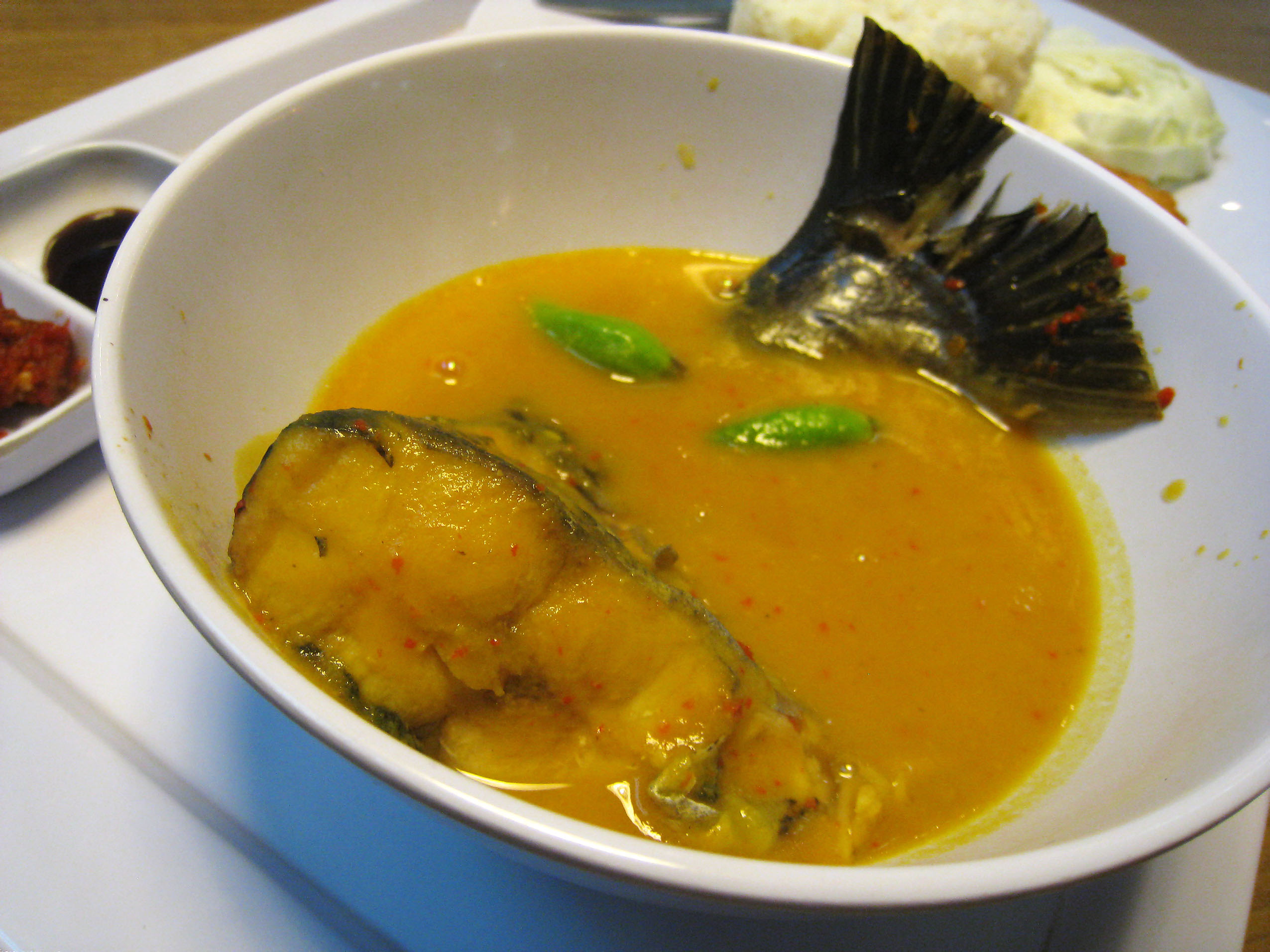
Tempoyak patin, pangasius fish served in fermented durian sauce.

Spices are also generally included although not as liberally as its same-island counterpart. Palembang cuisine is noted by its preference to the sour and sweet flavour, as evidences in pindang fish soup, funky-smelled tempoyak-based dish made from fermented durian, and also kuah cuko spicy sweet vinegar sauce of pempek fishcake. Those dishes are popular fare and often associated with the city.

== Influences ==
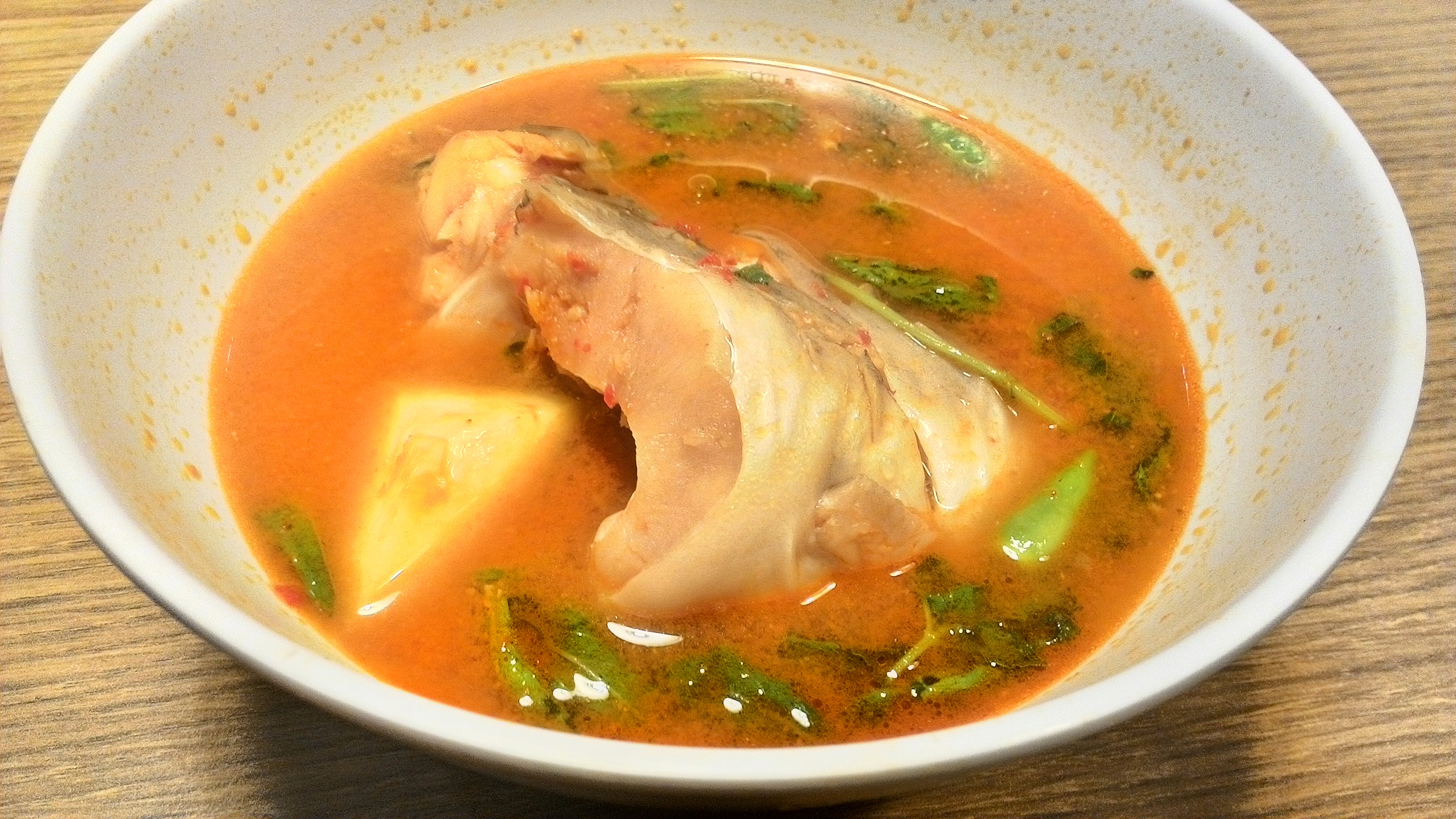
Pindang patin.

Malay, Javanese, Arab, Indian and Chinese culture has influenced Palembang's culinary scene.

Pempek, tekwan and mie celor are the example of Chinese cuisine influence on Palembang. Pempek is basically fishcake made from deboned fish flesh and tapioca flour, which was a local adaptation of East Asian surimi fishcake making. While like most of noodle dishes of Indonesia, mie celor can trace its origin back to Chinese influences.

It was popularly believed that Palembang preference of sweet flavour was due to Javanese influences that favouring palm sugar. Indeed, Palembang absorb many Javanese elements, including language and cuisine. For example, both Javanese and Palembang Malay dialects refer fish as iwak, and cooking method employing banana leaf package as brengkes or brengkesan.

Martabak Palembang and nasi minyak which uses ghee, on the other hand, demonstrate Indian cuisine influence in the city.

== Dishes ==
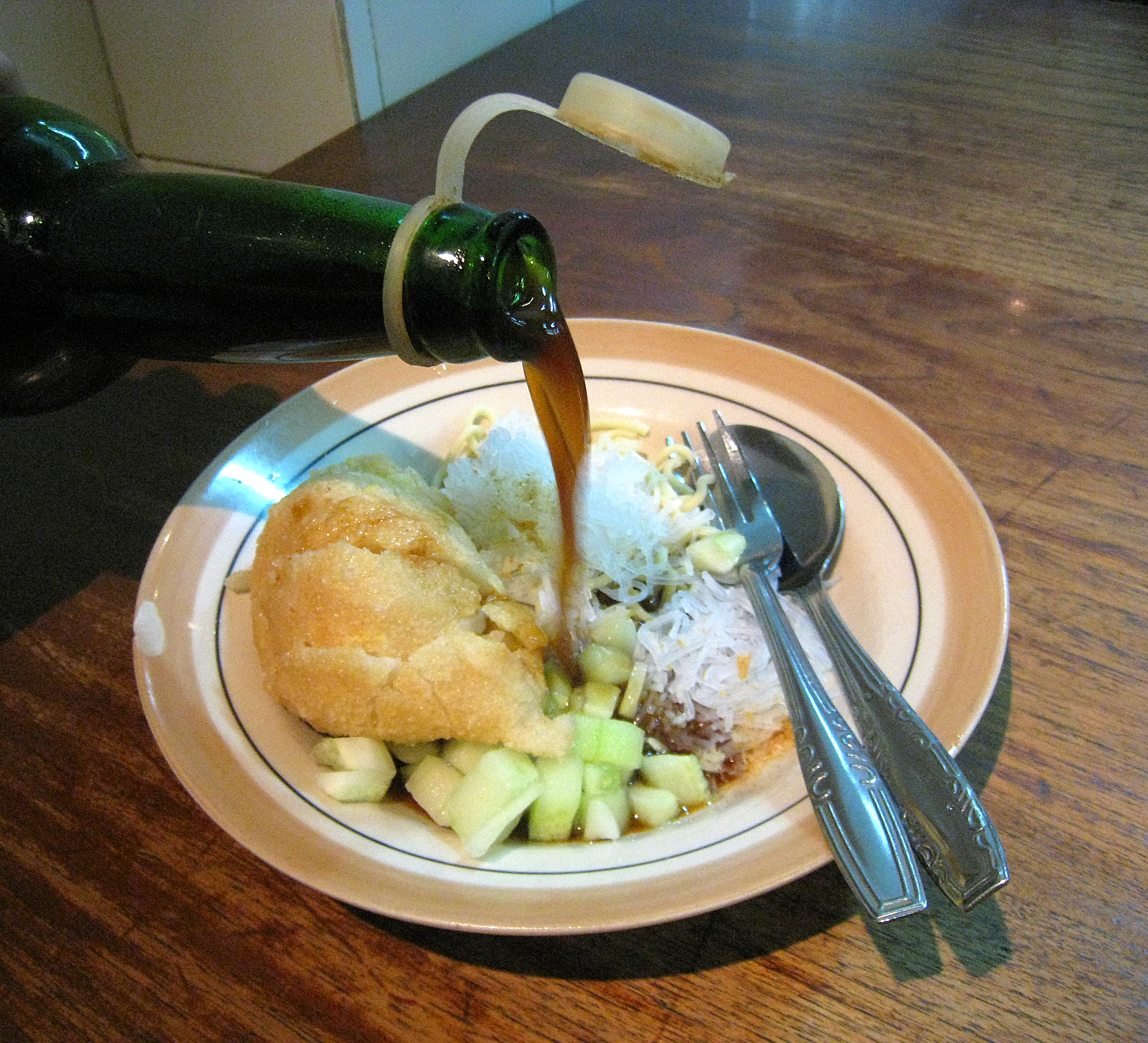
Pempek kapal selam and pempek kriting, simmered with spicy cuko sauce.

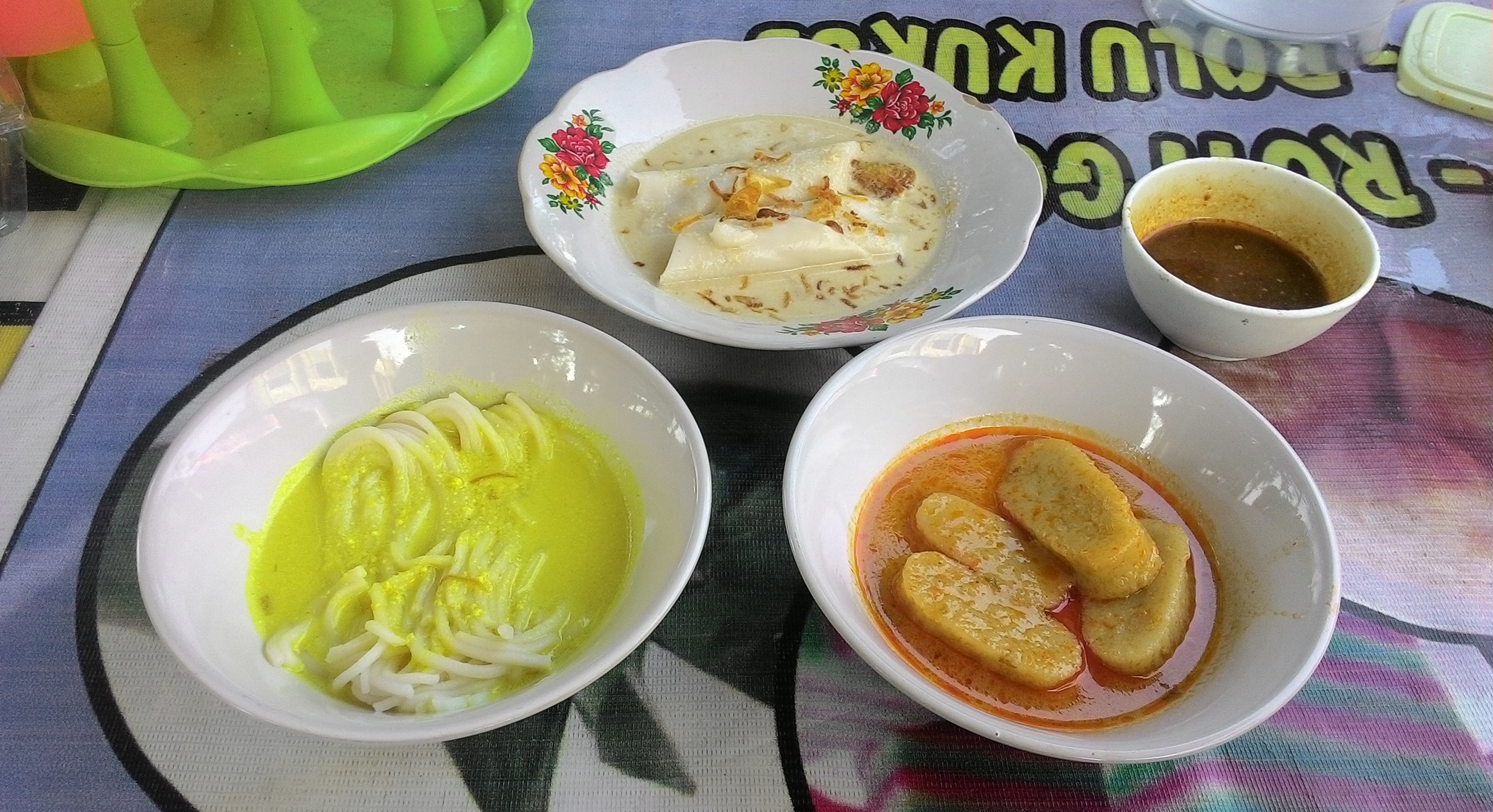
From left to right clockwise: lakso, burgo, and laksan.

Palembang dishes are well known for its extensive use of freshwater fish, its practice of making surimi-like fishcakes as the base of various recipes, also the use of palm sugar, coconut milk, vinegar or tamarind as flavouring agent. Examples of Palembang's favourite are:

- Pempek, is the dish virtually everyone in Indonesia thinks of when mentioning Palembang cuisine. It is a dough of fish cake and tapioca flour which can be either boiled, fried, or grilled and is eaten with a dark, sweet and spicy sauce called Cuko made from palm sugar and pepper topped with cucumber and prawn powder. Because it is actually a dough, locals have diligently crafted them into various shapes and sizes, as well as being creative with fillings. Examples include lenjer (long), keriting (curly), kapal selam (literally "submarine", filled with egg), ada`an (round and fried) and pistel (filled with cooked young papaya). Not every fish can be made into authentic Palembang pempek. A real authentic Palembang pempek is made of giant featherback (Chitala lopis) as its main ingredients. However, since the species is threatened, an authentic pempek can also be made with several other fish such as striped snakehead (Channa striata), narrow-barred Spanish mackerel (Scomberomorus commerson), or snappers (Lutjanus sp.).
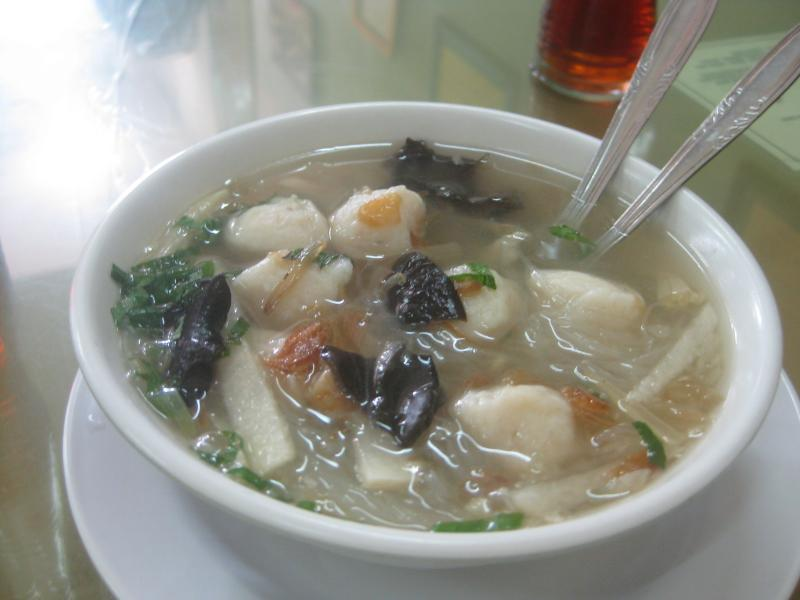
  Tekwan soup
- Tekwan, are small pempek balls served with fresh prawn soup, cellophane noodles, and ear mushrooms, often portrayed as the Palembang version of bakso.
- Model, are a variety of pempek with tofu fillings served with fresh prawn soup and cellophane noodles (model iwak). The pempek ingredients can be substituted with fried bread (model gendum).
- Laksan, are thick sliced pempek lenjer poured with spicy coconut milk and served with prawn powders.
- Celimpungan, are like laksan but with large sized tekwan balls instead of sliced pempek. A coconut milk gravy, enriching the dish's taste, is another highlight to notice. The thick sauce is simmered with turmeric, pepper, and bay leaves.
- Mie Celor, are yellow noodles like Japanese soba poured with coconut milk, prawns, and boiled egg.
- Burgo, are folded pancakes made of rice flour which are sliced and served with whitish coconut milk soup, snakehead fish or powdered prawns.
- Lakso, is similar to burgo, but lakso made of thick rice noodles and its soup has yellowish color acquired from turmeric.
- Ragit, the looks of this kind of bread is similar to Malay culinary signature, Lace Bread or well known as Roti Jala. Ragit has a two form which is a triangle roll Ragit and Ragit with a form omelet look-a-like. Ragit served with a curry soup which made from curry, coconut milk, meat, and potato. Mostly, Ragit curry soup garnished with fried onion and chopped green chili. Usually, you can find ragit during Ramadhan.
- Martabak HAR, is an egg-murtabak (eggs dropped into the flatten dough before folded while frying) served in curry (usually diced potatoes in beef curry) and topped with chillies in sweet-sour soy. It was popularized in Palembang by an Indian Indonesian named Haji Abdul Rozak on 7 July 1947, giving his initials to the dish name.
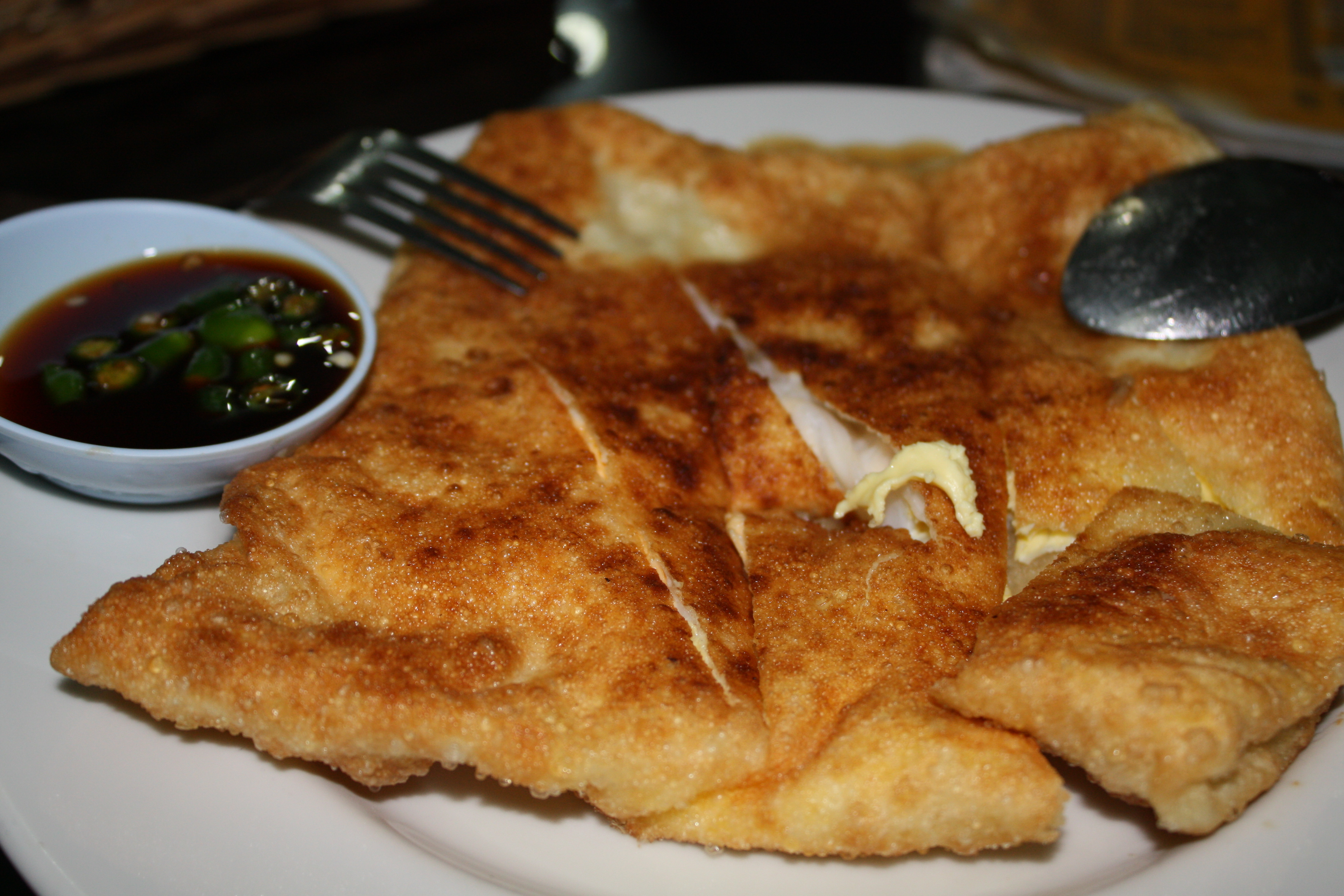
  Palembang-styled martabak proves an Indian acculturation of cuisine in Palembang
- Nasi gemuk (Palembang Malay for "fat rice") is a local version of coconut rice dish akin to nasi lemak.
- Nasi minyak (Palembang Malay for "oily rice") is a Sumatran dish of cooked rice with minyak samin (ghee) and spices.
- Pindang Patin, is spicy iridescent shark (Pangasianodon hypophthalmus) boiled with spices and usually served hot with sliced pineapple.
- Pindang Tulang, is spicy beef ribs with little meat still attached to the bone, boiled with spices like pindang patin. This dish has a savory spicy sour taste.
- Malbi, is a beef stewed with sweet soy sauce and spices. This meal usually be served during Eid al-Fitr or Palembang traditional wedding. A portion of Malbi usually will be served with nasi minyak or oil rice, a dish of rice cooked with ghee oil and spices.
- Tempoyak, is fermented durian stir-fried with onion and chili pepper.
- Brengkes Tempoyak Ikan Patin, is iridescent shark and tempoyak steamed with spices.
- Otak-otak, is freshwater fish minced meat mixed with tapioca flour, coconut milk and spices then grilled with banana leaf.

== Snacks ==
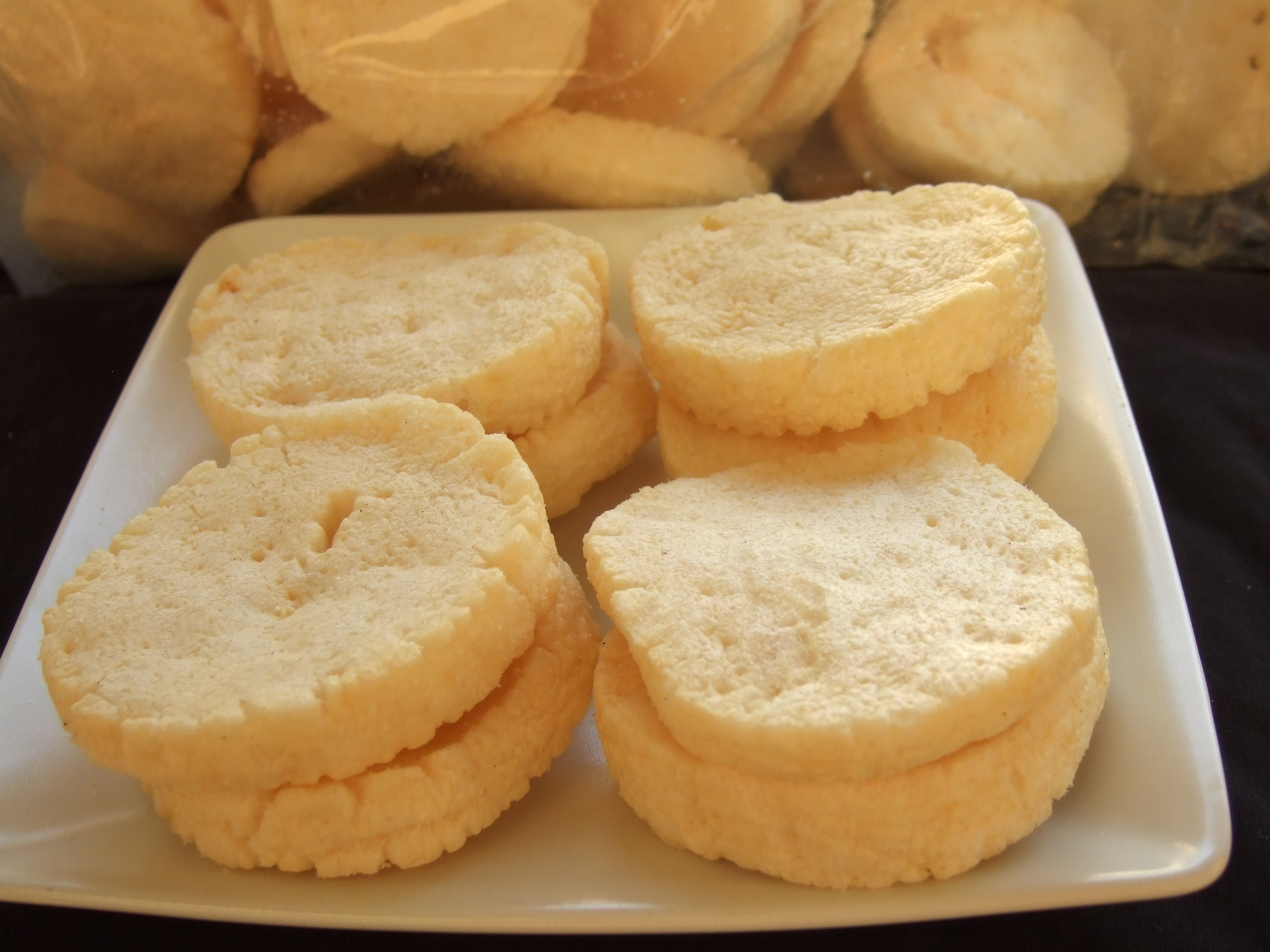
Kerupuk ikan or kemplang iwak, popular snack in Palembang

- Kemplang, are thin sliced pempek lenjer which are dried under sun, then grilled or fried.
- Kerupuk, are like kemplang, but the pempek dough made swirly and served after it was fried.

== Drinks ==
- Es Kacang Merah, (red bean shaved ice) are shave ices served with red kidney beans which is already soaked and boiled to remove their toxic contents, syrups, avocado, and sweet condensed milk.

== Sweets and desserts ==
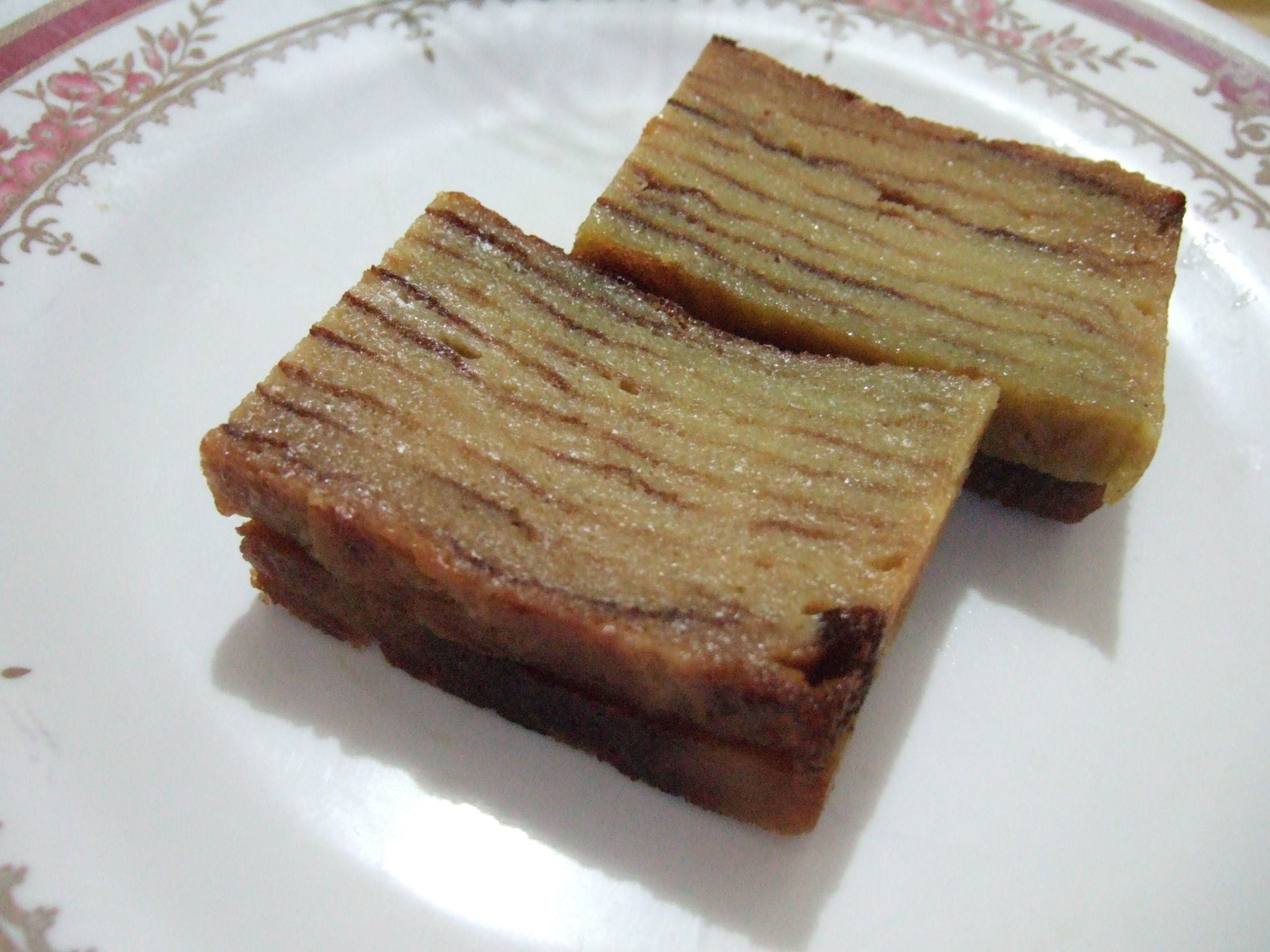
Kue maksuba, a flourless cake made with duck eggs and sweetened condensed milk.

- Kue Maksuba, is a layered cake which is mainly made with duck egg and sweetened condensed milk without any flours. Each cake needs approximately more than two dozens of duck eggs. After being properly mixed, the cake batter is thinly poured into a square cake pan then baked layer by layer. This cake was originally served as a royal sweets by Palembang Sultanate Palace to every honourable guests. Nowadays, this cake is served by many Palembang people during customary ceremonies or during Eid al-Fitr and sometimes Eid al-Adha.
- Kue Delapan Jam, is a cake with ingredients like kue maksuba also without any flours and uses eggs as main ingredient, but it is not layered. This cake called kue delapan jam (which literally translated as "eight hours cake") because this cake needs to be steam for 8 hours. A plenty of condensed milk is in the bowl along with eggs, thus its sweet taste. To make the cake cooked completely well, the cook needs to steam it on the small fire for eight hours straight. This cake is also often served to honourable guests, during customary ceremonies, or during Eid al-Fitr and sometimes Eid al-Adha.
- Kue Bolu Kojo, is a green sweet cake with eggs, sweet condensed milk and pandan leaves as its main ingredients. As opposed with Kue Maksuba and Kue Delapan Jam, this cake uses wheat flour. This cake is served to honourable guests, during customary ceremonies, or during Eid al-Fitr and sometimes Eid al-Adha.
- Kue Bolu Suri, is a brownish-yellow sweet cake made with eggs, sweet condensed milk and vanilla as its main ingredients, similar in taste with kue bolu kojo.
- Kue Srikayo, is a steamed dessert with eggs and pandan leaves as its main ingredients. It is usually served with glutinous rice.
- Engkak Ketan, this sweet cake is one of the oldest traditional cakes from Palembang. It is made of coconut milk, eggs, milk and glutinous rice flour results to a moist and sweet cake. Engkak Ketan is usually served during Eid al-Fitr as a part of the cultural traditions.
- Gulo Puan, The name is taken from "Gulo" meaning Sugar, "Puan" meaning Milk. Sweet dessert made from Buffalo Milk and usually Solid or Melted like Spread. This dessert usually found at Parking lot of Sultan Mahmud Badaruddin II Grand Mosque and only sold at Friday.
- Srikaya Tape, is a variant of tapai from Palembang, made by combining fermented stretch of cassavas with eggs, sugar, coconut milk and vanilla extracts or pandan leaves, giving it a distinctive bright yellow or green coloring. Despite its name, it does not use any sugar apple (Srikaya).

== See also ==
- Indonesian cuisine
