= Tempoyak =

Malay condiment made from fermented durian

Tempoyak تمڤويق
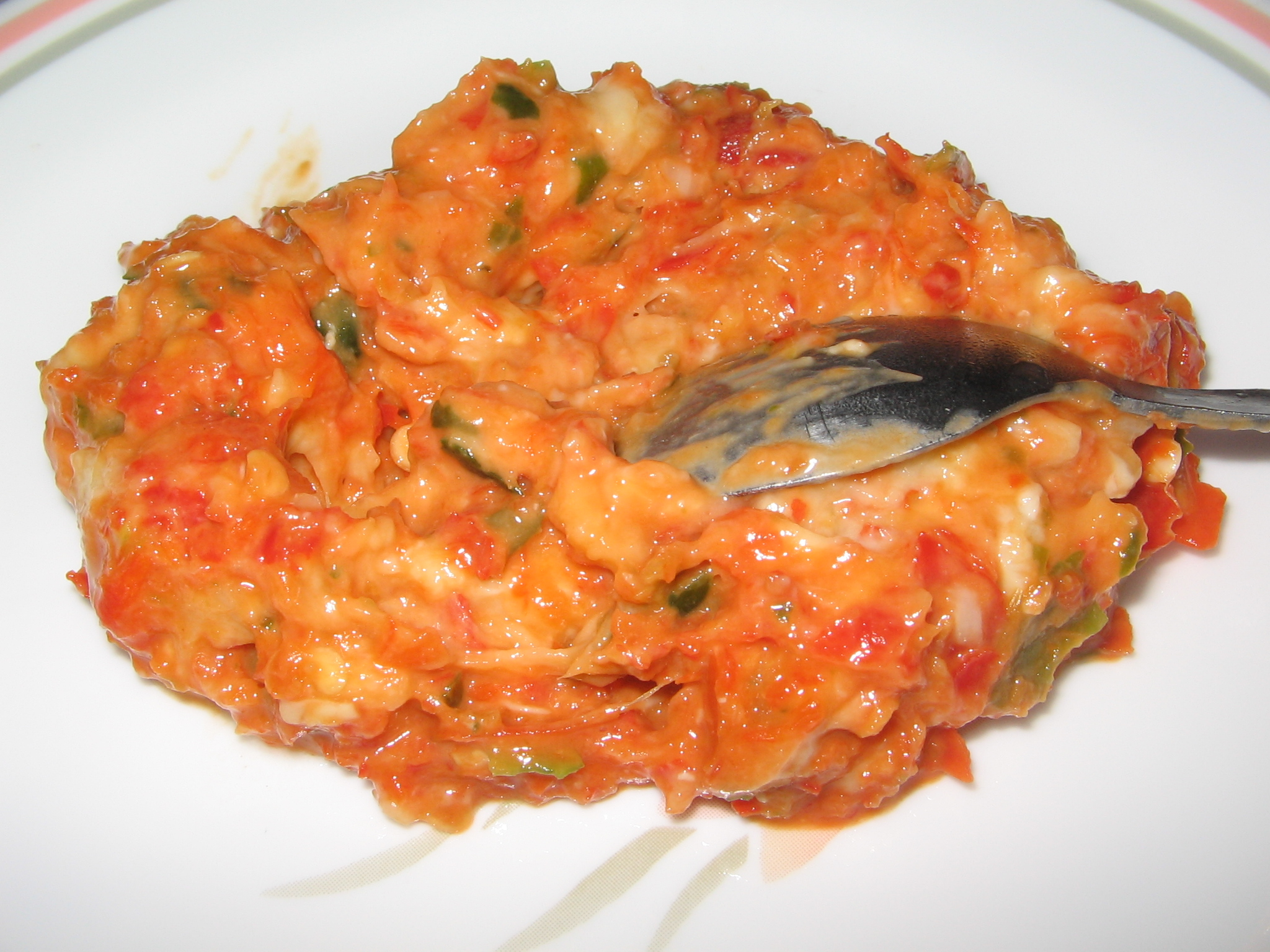
- Belacan tempoyak
- Alternative names: asam durian, pekasam
- Type: Condiment
- Course: Side dish
- Place of origin: Indonesia and Malaysia
- Region or state: Sumatra, Malay Peninsula, Borneo
- Associated cuisine: Brunei, Indonesia, Malaysia, Singapore
- Serving temperature: Room temperature or cold
- Main ingredients: Durian

Tempoyak (Jawi: تمڤويق), asam durian or pekasam is a Malay condiment made from fermented durian. It is usually consumed by the ethnic Malays in Maritime Southeast Asia, notably in Indonesia and Malaysia. Tempoyak is made by crushing durian flesh and mixing it with some salt and kept in room temperature from three to seven days for fermentation. Tempoyaks are usually made during the durian season, when the abundance of durian and excess production are made into fermented tempoyak.

Tempoyak is not normally consumed on its own; it is usually eaten as condiment or as an ingredient for cooking, such as when it is cooked with coconut milk curry as gulai tempoyak ikan patin (pangasius fish tempoyak curry), or mixed with spicy chili pepper as sambal tempoyak.

== Fermentation ==
In the Malay Archipelago, fermented durian is known by many names. It is commonly known as tempoyak in the Malay Peninsula, Borneo, and Southern Sumatra region (South Sumatra, Jambi, Bengkulu and Lampung provinces). It is known as pekasam in Aceh and asam durian in the Minangkabau region of West Sumatra. The word asam which translates to "sour" describes its fermentation process.

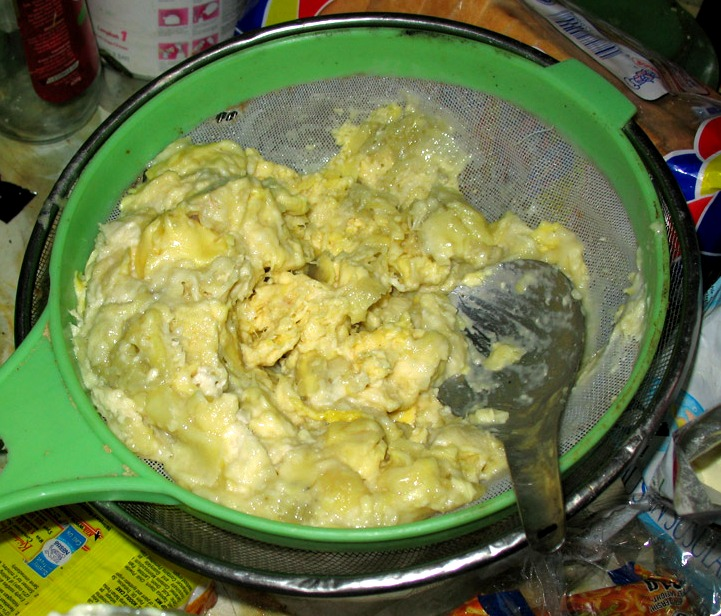
Tempoyak, made from fermented durian

Tempoyak is made by crushing the flesh of durian and mixing it with salt or sugar. It is kept at room temperature (28–34 °C) and left to ferment for three to seven days, under anaerobic conditions (obtained by closing the container lid). The bacteria involved in the fermentation process can vary depending on many factors such as durian variety, fermentation conditions and indigenous microorganisms in the environment. One study reported a progressive succession of different native lactic acid bacteria during the fermentation process, with Leuconostoc mesenteroides and Fructobacillus durionis being prominent in the early phases, with the latter remaining dominant throughout the fermentation. Another author found that predominant strains are: Weissella paramesenteroides, Enterococcus faecalis, Enterococcus gallinarum, Lactobacillus plantarum, Lactobacillus brevis, Lactobacillus fermentum, Lactobacillus mali, Leuconostoc mesenteroides, Lactobacillus casei and Pediococcus acidilactici. These lactic acid bacteria inhibit the growth of harmful decomposing bacteria, such as Escherichia coli, which in turn preserves the durian flesh. Besides its functions as a food preservative, fermented tempoyak also serves as a natural food flavoring. The addition of tempoyak into chili paste and curry can add a distinct aroma and savoury flavour to the dish.

== History ==
Just like many fermented food products in the region (e.g. belacan, pekasam, cincalok, budu, and tapai), tempoyak was probably discovered unintentionally; from the excessive unconsumed durian and thus left fermented, during the abundance of durian season in the region.

Tempoyak is mentioned in Hikayat Abdullah as a staple food for the people of Terengganu. When Abdullah Abdul Kadir visited Terengganu around 1836, he said that one of the favorite foods of the local resident is Tempoyak. Based on Hikayat Abdullah, tempoyak is a food special to the ethnic Malays, and a speciality of the states of the east coast of the Malay Peninsula. Temerloh in Pahang, Malaysia is known as the capital for ikan patin because of its fish farms and also its restaurants offering savoury ikan patin masak tempoyak (silver catfish cooked in fermented durian gravy).

In Indonesia, tempoyak is exceptionally popular in Southern Sumatra, especially in Palembang, where tempoyak ikan patin (pangasius fish in tempoyak sauce), and brengkes tempoyak (tempoyak fish in banana leaf package) is a popular local specialty.

== Indonesia ==
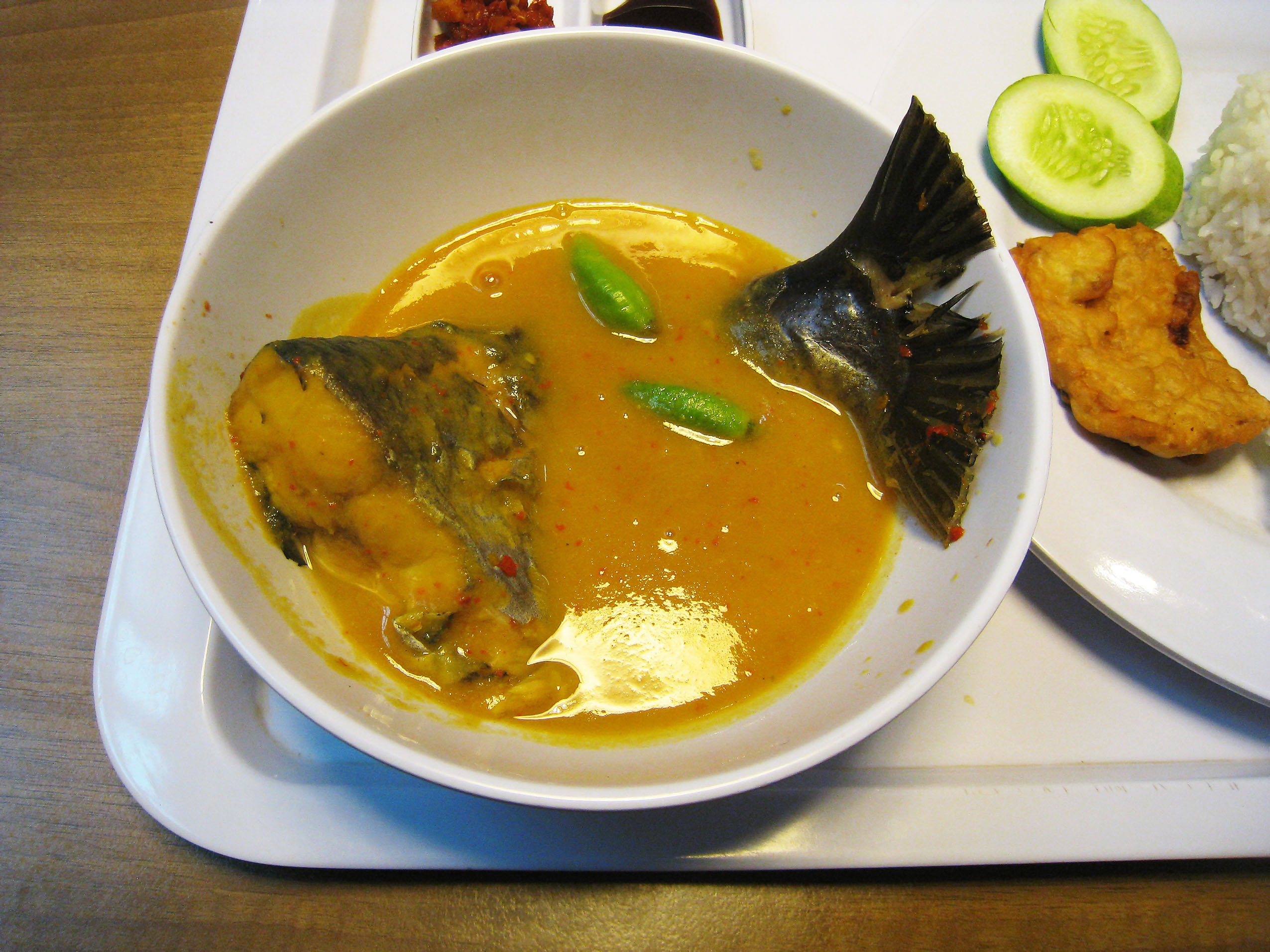
Tempoyak ikan patin, Pangasius in sweet and spicy tempoyak sauce, specialty of Palembang.

In Indonesia, tempoyak is especially popular in Palembang, and also in other cities and provinces in Sumatra such as Riau, Jambi, Bengkulu, Lampung and also Pontianak in Kalimantan.

In Palembang, the dish tempoyak ikan patin (Pangasius catfish in tempoyak sauce) and brengkes (pepes) tempoyak are well known, which is a steamed fermented durian paste in banana leaf container, usually mixed with patin (Pangasius fish) as brengkes ikan patin tempoyak. A spicy condiment called sambal tempoyak is made from the mixture of fermented durian, ground belacan (shrimp paste) and chili pepper.

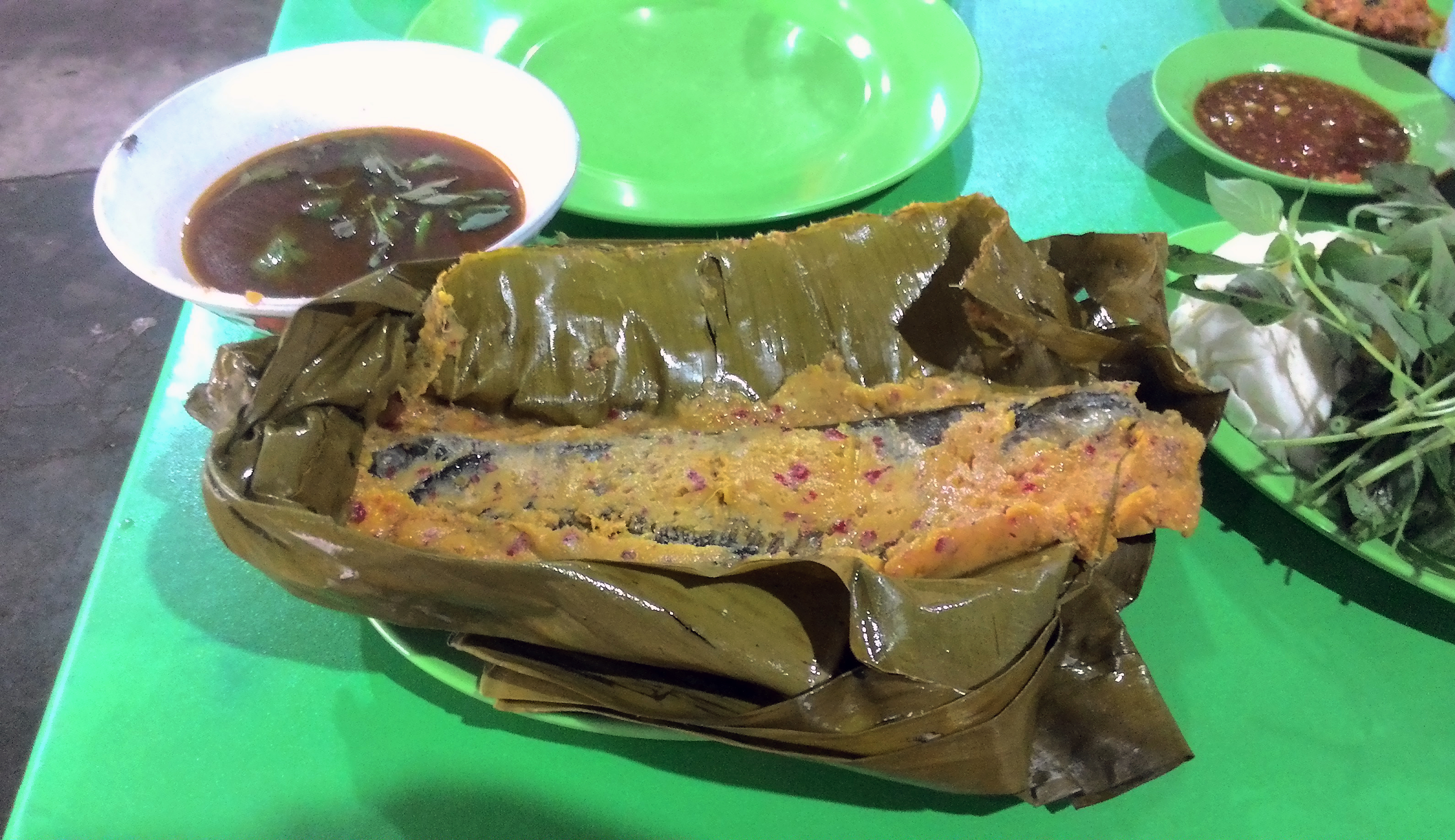
Brengkes tempoyak iwak lais served in a traditional restaurant in Palembang.

In Lampung, tempoyak is made as sambal seruit tempoyak. Seruit is shredded fried freshwater fishes, such as patin (Pangasius), baung (Hemibagrus), lais (Kryptopterus), belida (Giant featherback) or mas (carp), mixed with ground chili pepper, tomato, shallot, shrimp paste, lime juice, young unripe mango, salt and tempoyak.

In Pontianak and Bengkulu, tempoyak is usually served as spicy condiment as sambal tempoyak, mixed with red chili pepper, fresh shrimp or teri (anchovy) and petai (green stinky bean).

== Malaysia ==
In Malaysia, tempoyak is specifically popular in the state of Pahang and Perak, yet it is also can be found elsewhere, from Kuala Lumpur to Sarawak. In Malaysia, tempoyak is an essential ingredient for gulai tempoyak ikan patin (pangasius fish tempoyak curry) and for cooking soup with tang hoon or glass noodles. Temerloh in Pahang is known for farmed ikan patin (Shark catfish ) mostly the Swai a fish known for a popular traditional dish, patin masak tempoyak (cooked with fermented durian), and another local favorites such as pais patin (grilled with tempoyak) and deep-fried with chilies.

In Sarawak, tempoyak is available in the marketplace. The taste is said to be sour and salty with a lot of nutty, durian flavours.

== See also ==
- List of fermented foods
- Gulai
- Minangkabau cuisine
- Malay cuisine
- Palembang cuisine
