= Kryptopterus geminus =

Conservation status
- Least Concern (IUCN 3.1)

Scientific classification
- Domain: Eukaryota
- Kingdom: Animalia
- Phylum: Chordata
- Class: Actinopterygii
- Order: Siluriformes
- Family: Siluridae
- Genus: Kryptopterus
- Species: K. geminus

Binomial name
- Kryptopterus geminus H. H. Ng, 2003

Species of fish

Kryptopterus geminus is a species of catfish belonging to the family Siluridae. It can be distinguished from all its congeners, with the exception of Kryptopterus cryptopterus, by the almost flat dorsal profile with no concavity behind the head. This species grows to a length of 17.1 centimetres (6.7 in) SL.

Examples of this distinctively shaped, translucent fish used to be assigned to the long-established species K. cryptopterus but recent studies have shown several small but consistent differences which prompted the erection of this new species. It has been recorded in Cambodia, Laos, Thailand and Vietnam. K. geminus can be distinguished from this close relative by its narrower head, longer snout, longer anal fin and eyes located much more laterally.
