= Nasi gurih =

Javanese rice dish

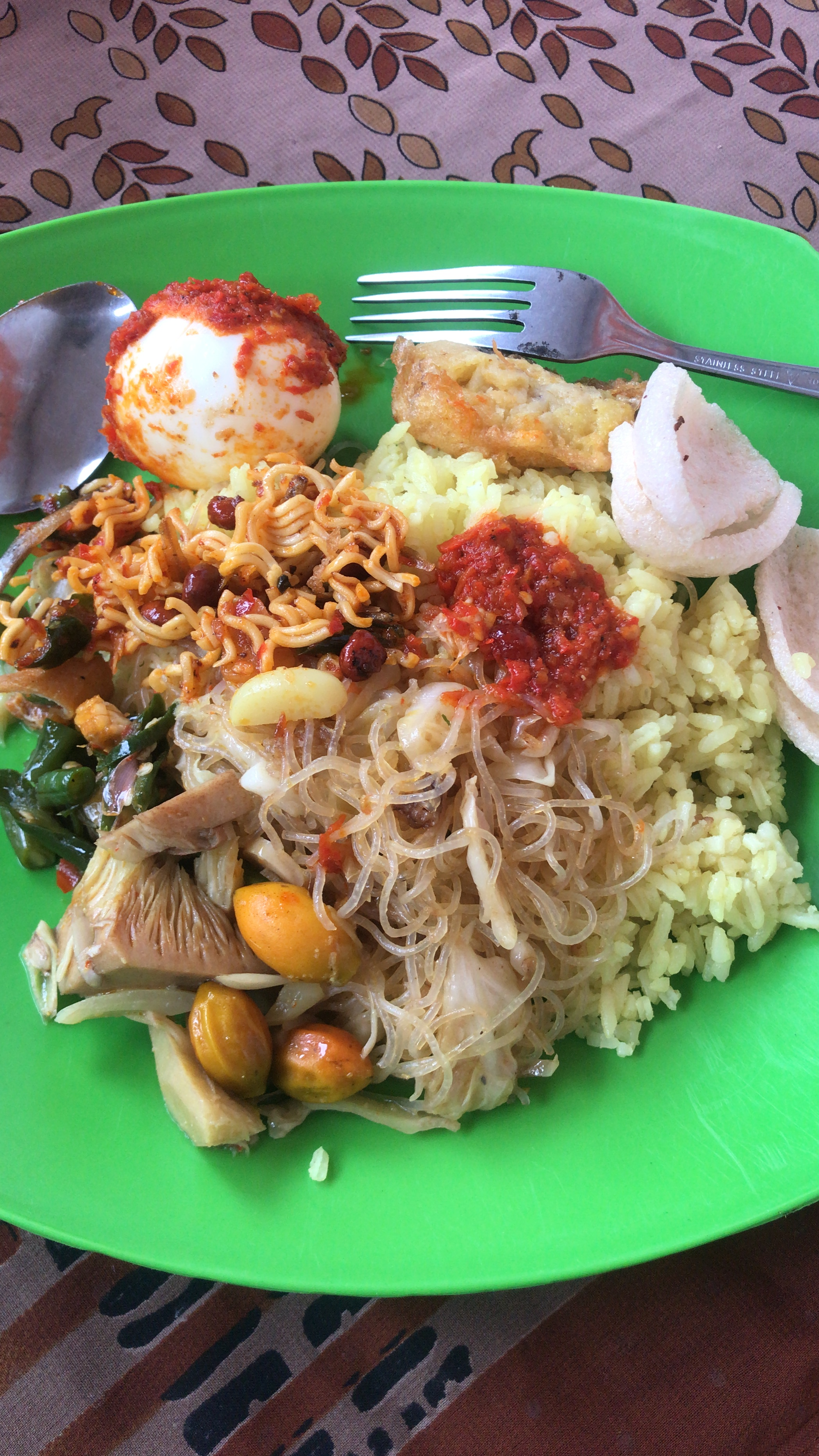
- Nasi gurih served in Medan
- Alternative names: bu ngiang (in Acehnese)
- Course: Main course
- Place of origin: Indonesia
- Region or state: East Java (mainly)
- Serving temperature: Hot or room temperature
- Main ingredients: Rice cooked in coconut milk and spices with various side dishes
- Variations: Similar to Nasi Uduk and Nasi lemak

Nasi gurih (Javanese: ꦤꦱꦶꦒꦸꦫꦶꦃ, romanized: nasi gurih; Acehnese: bu ngiang) is a Javanese steamed rice cooked in coconut milk and spices dish, commonly found in Eastern Javanese (and its diasporic community in Aceh) culinary tradition.

== Etymology ==
Nasi gurih means "succulent rice" in Indonesian. The name describes the rich taste of rice cooked with coconut milk and spices.

== Preparation ==
Nasi gurih is made by cooking mixture of rice and sticky rice soaked in coconut milk instead of water, along with salt, lemongrass, Indian bay leaf, and pandan leaves to add aroma.

== Side dishes ==
Nasi gurih sold in Acehnese warung or other eating establishments is commonly offered with an assortment of side dishes, chosen according to the client's desire. The basic ingredients sprinkled upon nasi gurih are fried peanuts, bawang goreng (fried shallot), tauco (soybean paste), sambal, and krupuk. Side dishes are ikan balado (fish in chili), udang sambal (shrimp in chili), ayam goreng, dendeng (beef jerky), and perkedel (fried mashed potato patty).

== Variants ==
There are similar dishes in other parts of Indonesia called nasi uduk from Jakarta and nasi lemak, commonly found in the Riau and Riau islands (Sumatera), as well as Malaysia, Brunei, and Singapore.

== See also ==
- Nasi lemak
- Nasi gemuk
- Nasi uduk
- Nasi liwet
- Nasi kuning
- Nasi minyak
