= Lakso =

Indonesian spicy noodle dish

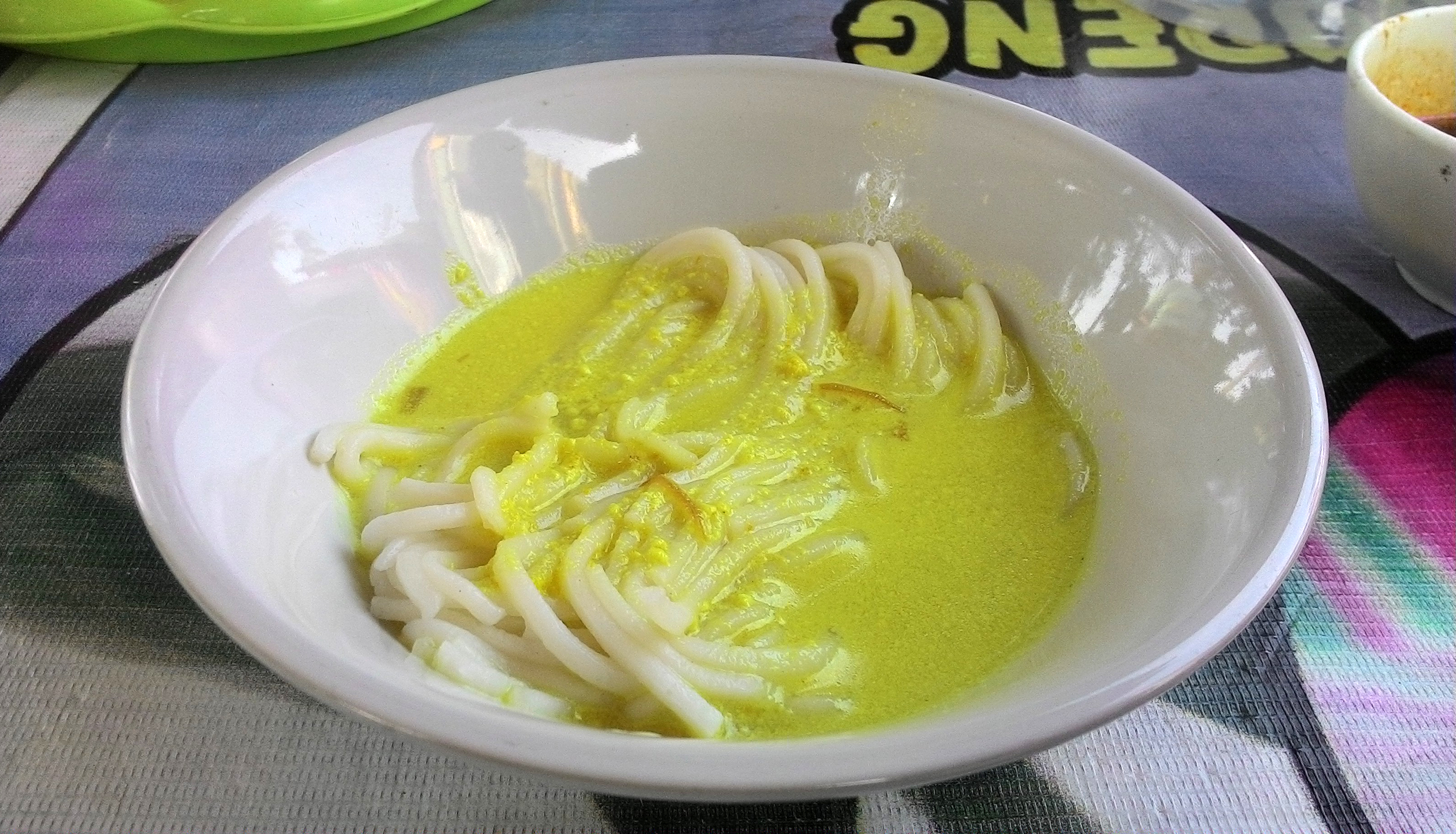
- Course: Main course or snack
- Place of origin: Indonesia
- Region or state: Palembang, South Sumatra
- Serving temperature: Hot
- Main ingredients: Thick noodles made from rice flour or sago, served in savoury yellow coconut milk-based soup, often flavoured with fish, sprinkled with crispy fried shallot
- Variations: Burgo

Lakso is a spicy Indonesian noodle dish served in savoury yellowish coconut milk-based soup, flavoured with fish, and sprinkled with fried shallots. The dish is one of the regional specialty of Palembang, the capital of South Sumatra, Indonesia.

Lakso is often described as the Palembang-style laksa. However, actually it is quite different from recipes for laksa common in neighboring Malaysia and Singapore. Lakso is quite similar to burgo, although burgo is folded rice pancake and its soup has a whitish color. In Palembang, lakso together with burgo is a popular choice for breakfast.

== See also ==
- Pempek
- Laksa
- Palembangese cuisine
- Rice noodles
