= Burgo (food) =

Indonesian rice pancake

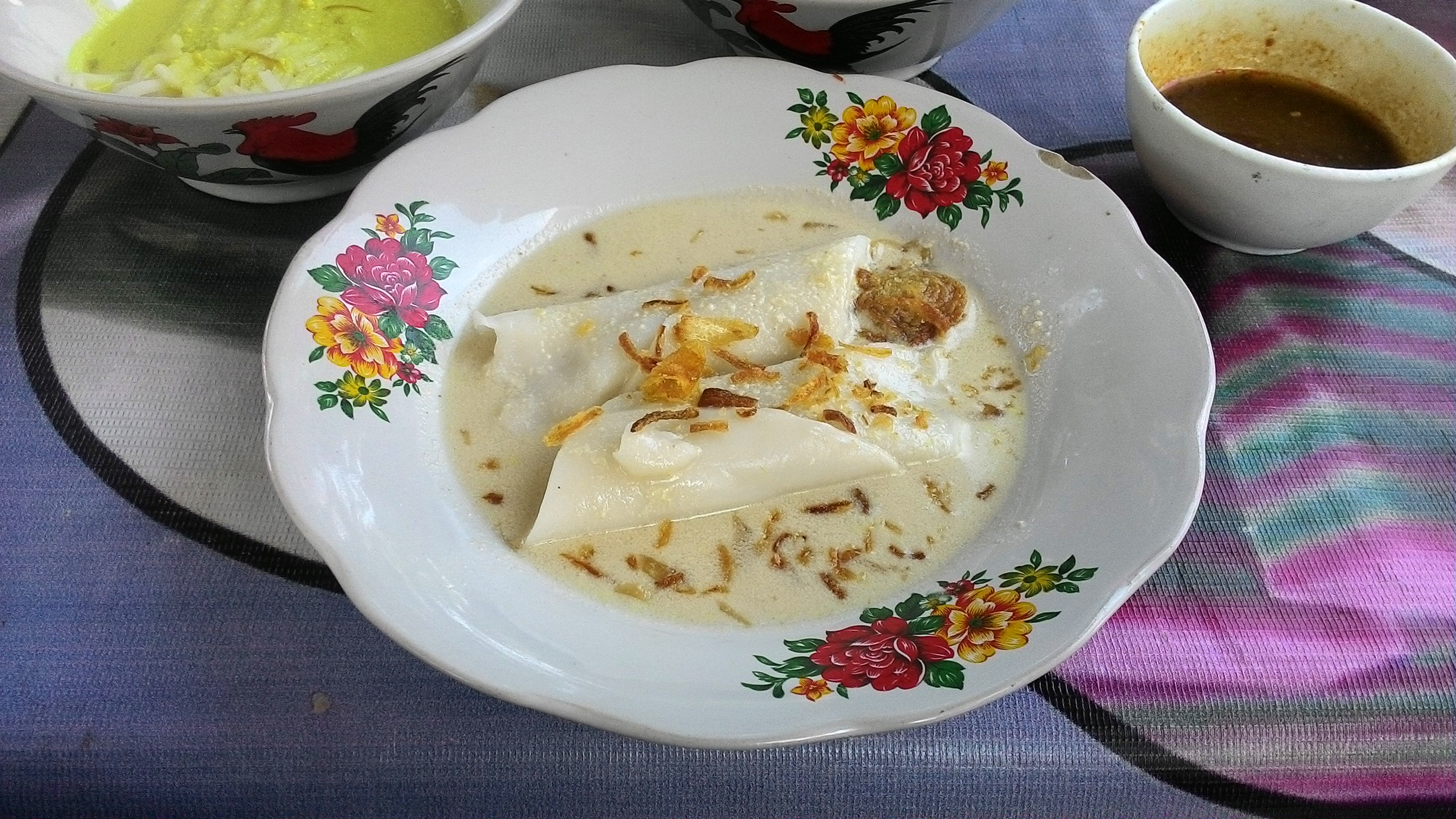
- Course: Main course or snack
- Place of origin: Indonesia
- Region or state: Palembang, South Sumatra
- Serving temperature: Hot
- Main ingredients: Folded pancake made from rice flour, served in savoury coconut milk-based soup, often flavoured with fish, sprinkled with crispy fried shallot
- Variations: Lakso

Burgo is an Indonesian folded rice pancake served in savoury whitish coconut milk-based soup, flavoured with fish, and sprinkled with fried shallots. The dish is one of the regional specialty of Palembang, the capital of South Sumatra, Indonesia. In Palembang, burgo is a popular choice for breakfast. Burgo is quite similar to lakso, although lakso is thick rice noodles and its soup has yellowish color acquired from turmeric.

== Ingredients ==
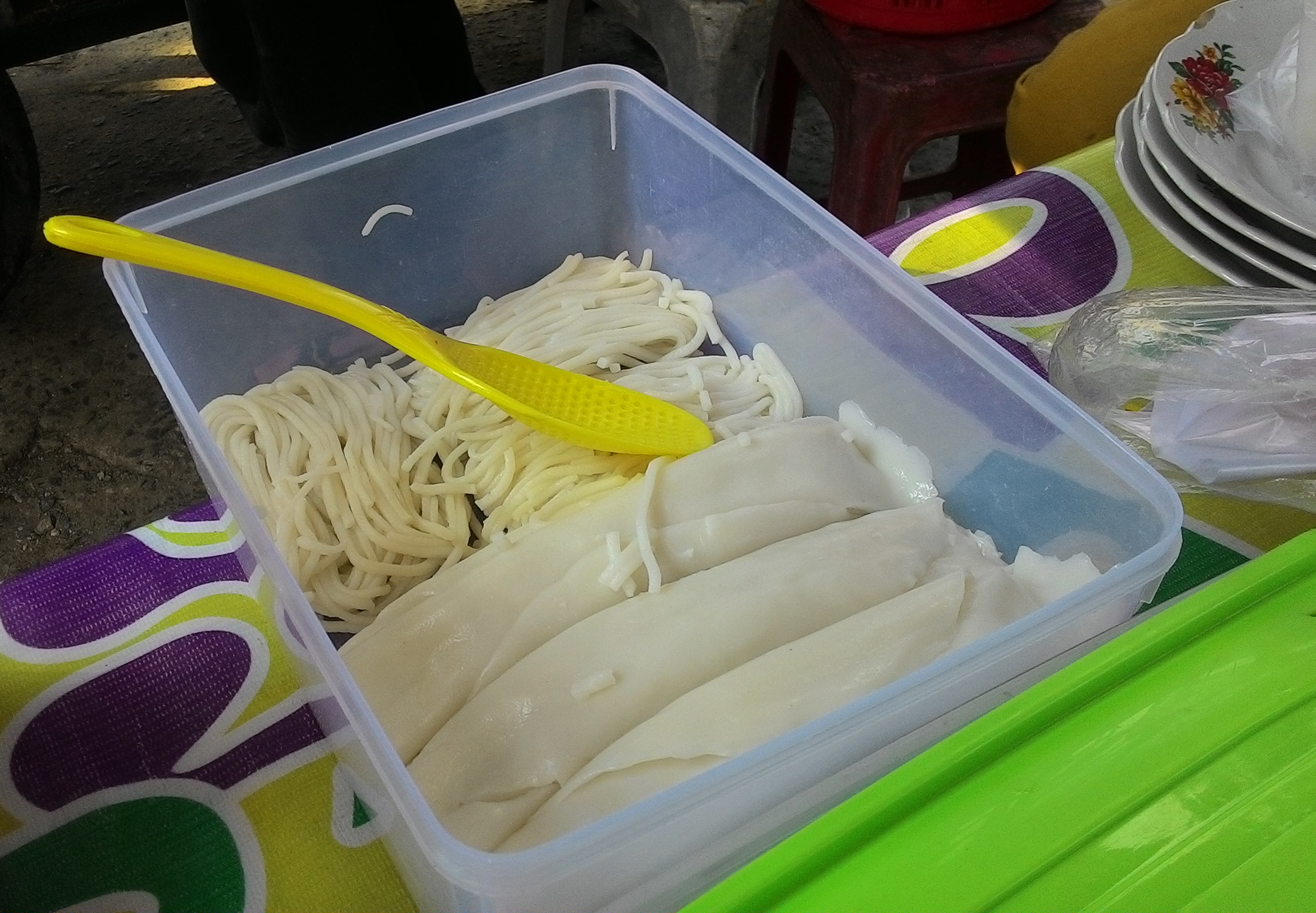
Lakso noodles and folded burgo pancake prior of serving

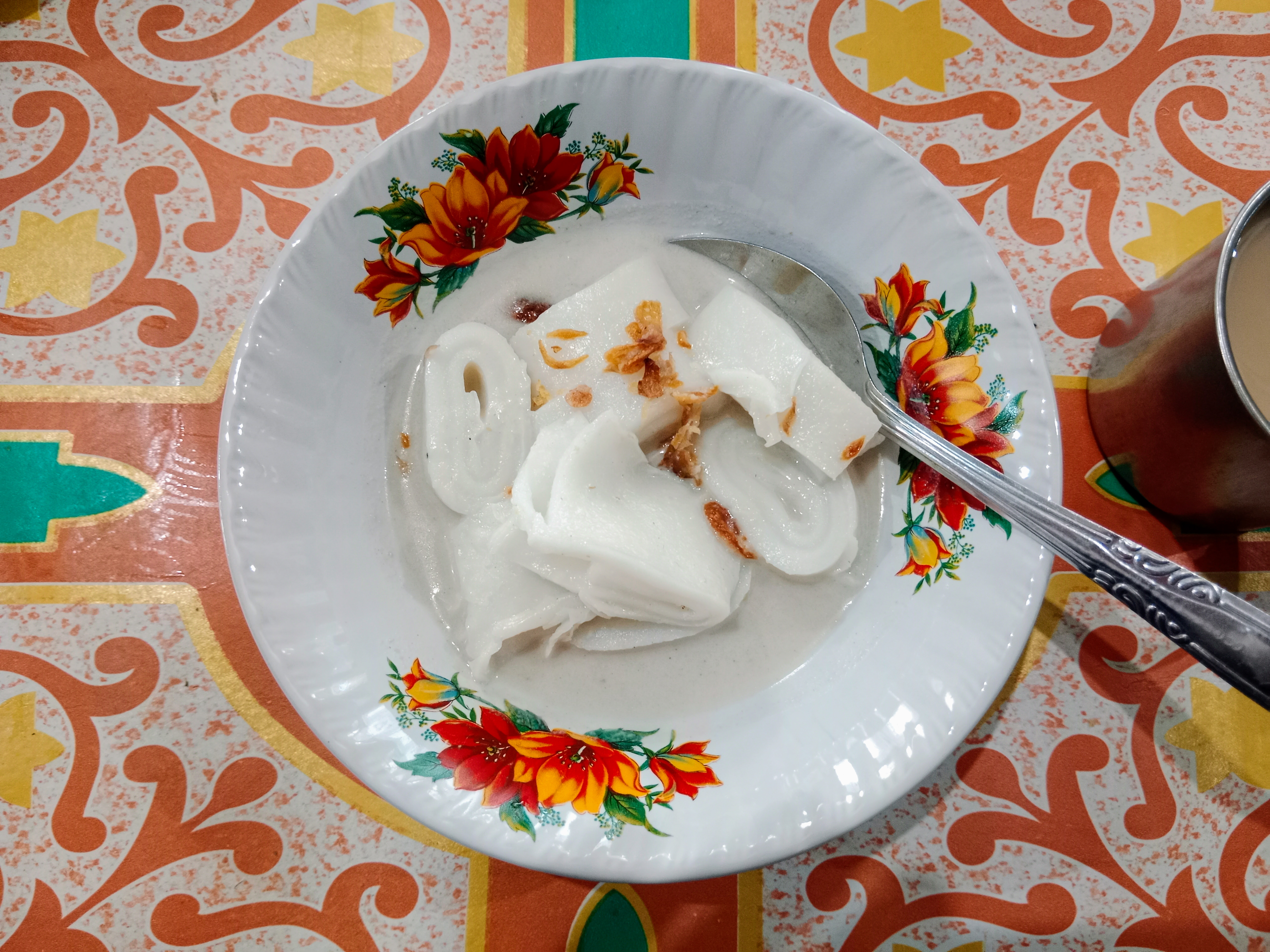
Burgo served in chopped pieces

The pancake batter is a mixture of rice flour, sago or tapioca with water. The pancake is made by frying the batter on frypan in similar fashion on making thin pancake, and then folded into rolls. The soup is whitish in colour, made from coconut milk with slices of fish flesh. Various fish can be used. However, the most common one is ikan gabus (snakehead). A simpler recipe might use powdered dried shrimp instead of fish.

The coconut milk soup is spiced with garlic, coriander, galangal, salt, and salam leaf (Indonesian bay leaf). Prior of serving, the folded pancake is being cut and poured with coconut milk soup, and sprinkled with crispy fried shallot or onion. Sambal chili sauce and pressed key lime juice often added as condiment for those who prefer spiciness and fresh sourness.

== See also ==
- List of pancakes
- Pempek
- Laksa
