= Malbi =

Beef dish from Palembang, Indonesia

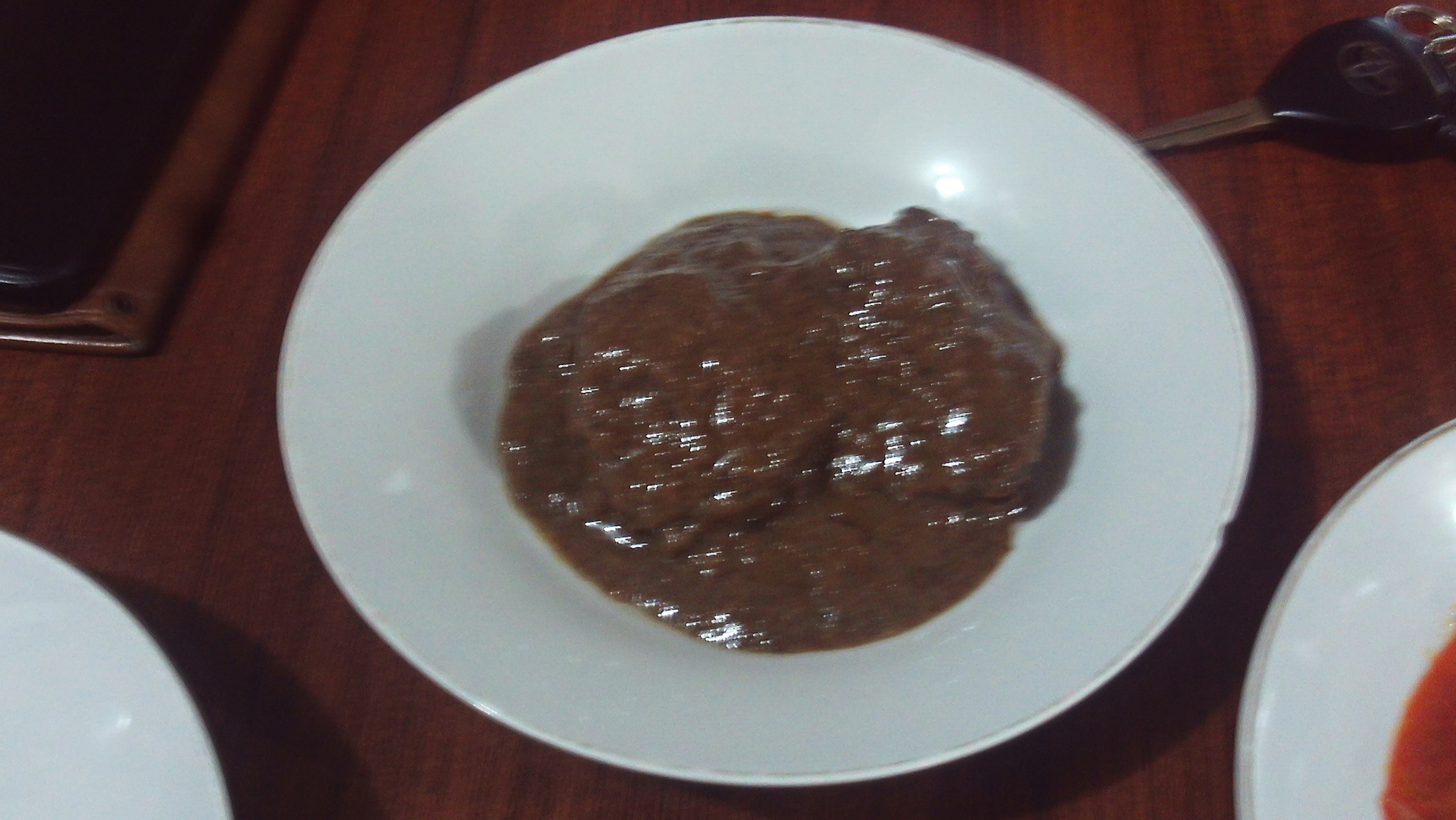
- Malbi in Jambi
- Course: Main course
- Place of origin: Indonesia
- Region or state: Palembang
- Serving temperature: Hot or room temperature
- Main ingredients: Beef cooked with a variety of spices

Malbi is a meat stew originating from Palembang that resembles beef semur. This dish is dark in color, like rendang, and has a sweet and savory taste.

== Ingredients ==
The main characteristics of malbi, apart from its color, are its abundant and thick sauce as well as the use of spices. The main ingredients of this dish are beef and seasonings such as tamarind, shallots, garlic, lemongrass, bay leaves, ginger, galangal, cloves, pepper, mesoyi or cinnamon, nutmeg, and sweet soy sauce.

Malbi is cooked slowly until the spices are absorbed into the meat and the sauce thickens. It can be prepared with coconut milk or only water. There are also other variations that add roasted grated coconut or kerisik.

== History ==
Malbi is believed to be a dish resulting from the cultural acculturation of Arab, Indian, and Malay influences. The food has existed since the era of the Palembang Sultanate. This dish was served to Sultan Mahmud Badaruddin I and the royal officials after Friday prayers. Malbi was eaten together with the Arab and Indian elite communities. The preparation of this curry was entrusted to Arabs and Indians due to shared religion, tastes, and the spices used, and it was usually only served at major events. Today, malbi is usually served during Eid al-Fitr and weddings.

== Serving ==
Malbi is usually served with nasi minyak, crackers, pineapple sambal, and pickles. Malbi curry is also served with white rice or ketupat sayur.
