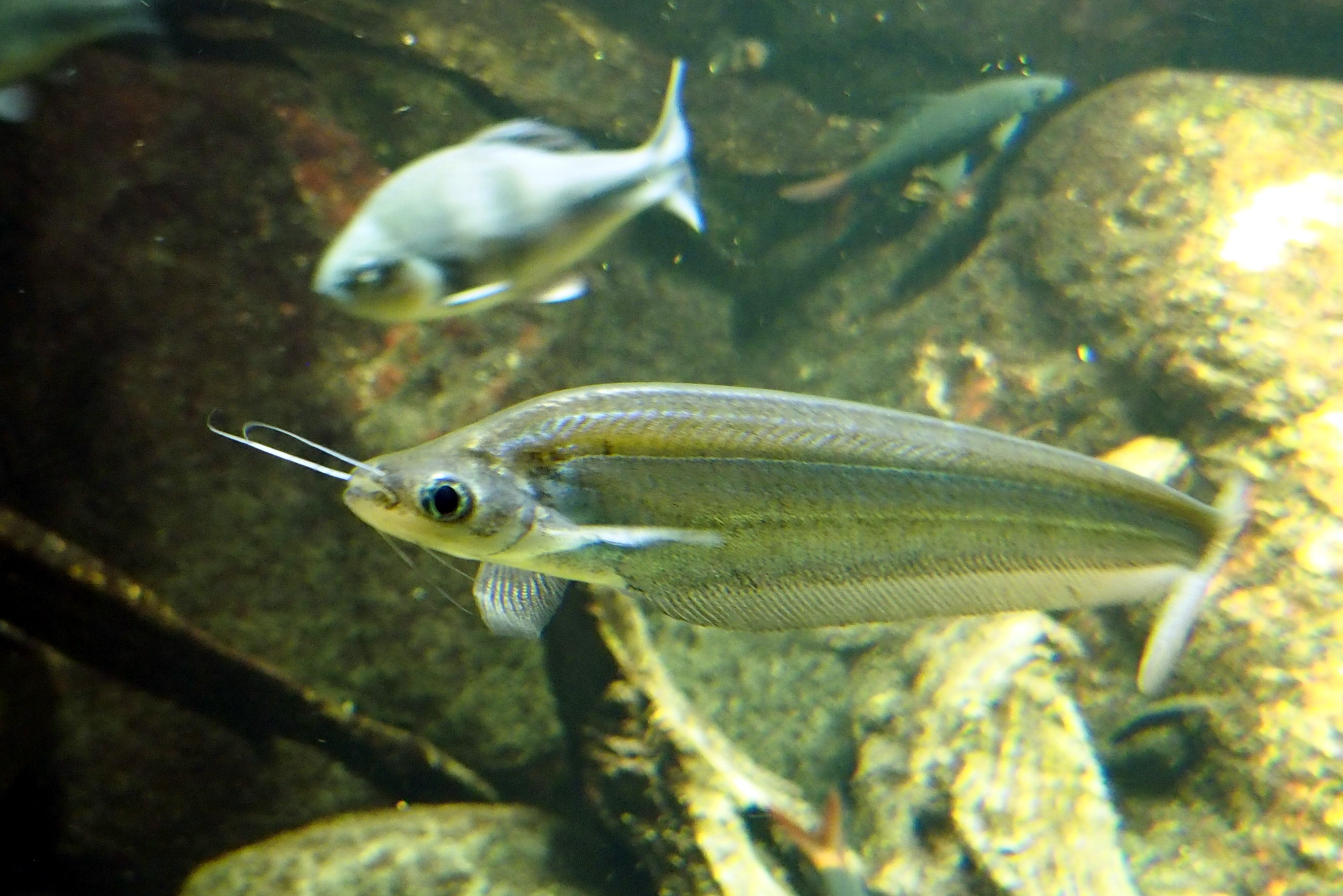

Conservation status
- Least Concern (IUCN 3.1)

Scientific classification
- Kingdom: Animalia
- Phylum: Chordata
- Class: Actinopterygii
- Division: Teleostei
- Order: Siluriformes
- Family: Siluridae
- Genus: Kryptopterus
- Species: K. cryptopterus

Binomial name
- Kryptopterus cryptopterus (Bleeker, 1851)

Synonyms
- Silurus cryptopterus Bleeker, 1851; Kryptopterus micropus Bleeker, 1858

= Kryptopterus cryptopterus =

Species of fish

Kryptopterus cryptopterus (blue sheatfish) is a species of catfish, the type species of the genus Kryptopterus. It can be distinguished from all its congeners, with the exception of the newly split Kryptopterus geminus, by the almost flat dorsal profile with no concavity behind the head. This species grows to a length of 14.6 centimetres (5.7 in) SL.

This distinctively shaped, translucent fish is found in Peninsular Malaysia, Borneo and Sumatra. Specimens from Cambodia, Laos, Thailand and Vietnam previously assigned to this species are now recognized as a separate species, K. geminus. K. cryptopterus can be distinguished from this close relative by its broader head, shorter snout, shorter anal fin and eyes located much more ventrally.

== As food ==
In Thailand it is one of the catfish species known in the markets as Pla Nuea On (ปลาเนื้ออ่อน), highly valued as food in the local cuisine for its delicate flesh. This fish is also often used for making fish balls.

== See also ==
- List of Thai ingredients
