= Nasi minyak =

Rice dish

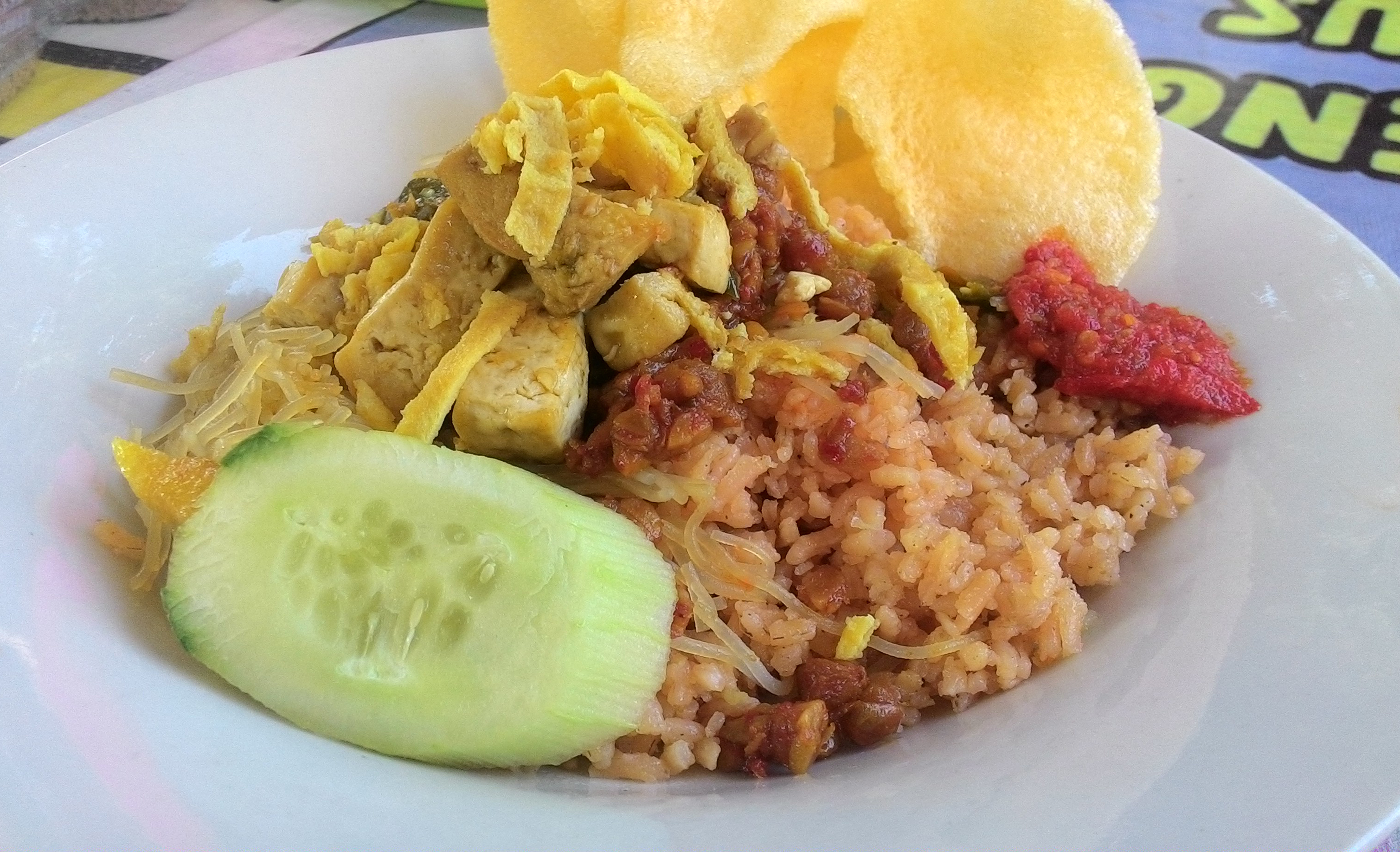
- Nasi minyak served in Palembang, Southern Sumatra, Indonesia
- Course: Main course
- Place of origin: Indonesia, Malaysia, Singapore, Thailand
- Region or state: South Sumatra, Jambi, Malay Peninsula, Riau Archipelago, Singapore, Southern Thailand
- Serving temperature: Warm
- Main ingredients: Rice cooked in ghee and spices

Nasi minyak (Malay for "oily rice") is an Indonesian and Malay dish of cooked rice with ghee (minyak sapi or minyak samin) and spices. It is traditionally associated with Malay cuisine in the Sumatra, Malay Peninsula, Singapore, southern Thailand and the Riau Archipelago, where it is commonly served during weddings, kenduri, religious celebrations and other ceremonial occasions.

The dish forms part of a broader tradition of spiced rice dishes in maritime Southeast Asia influenced by South Asian and Middle Eastern culinary traditions, particularly pilaf, kabsa and biryani. It is typically cooked with clarified butter and spices such as cinnamon, cloves, cardamom and star anise, and is usually accompanied by dishes including gulai, fried chicken, beef or mutton preparations. Regional variations of nasi minyak are found throughout the Malay world, including versions associated with Malay, Indian Muslim and Hadhrami Arab culinary traditions.

Among Patani Malay communities in southern Thailand, the dish is also known as nasi minyok and is closely associated with the local Muslim food tradition, where it is interchangeably referred as khao mok (Thai: ข้าวหมก).

== Etymology ==
The term nasi minyak is derived from Malay, in which nasi means rice and minyak means oil. The name refers to the use of oil or fat, typically ghee (minyak sapi) or butter, in the preparation of the dish. In Malay usage, the term minyak may refer broadly to edible oils and fats, including clarified butter used in cooking. The compound term is used to distinguish the dish from plain steamed rice (nasi putih) and other rice preparations cooked without added fat or aromatics.

== History ==
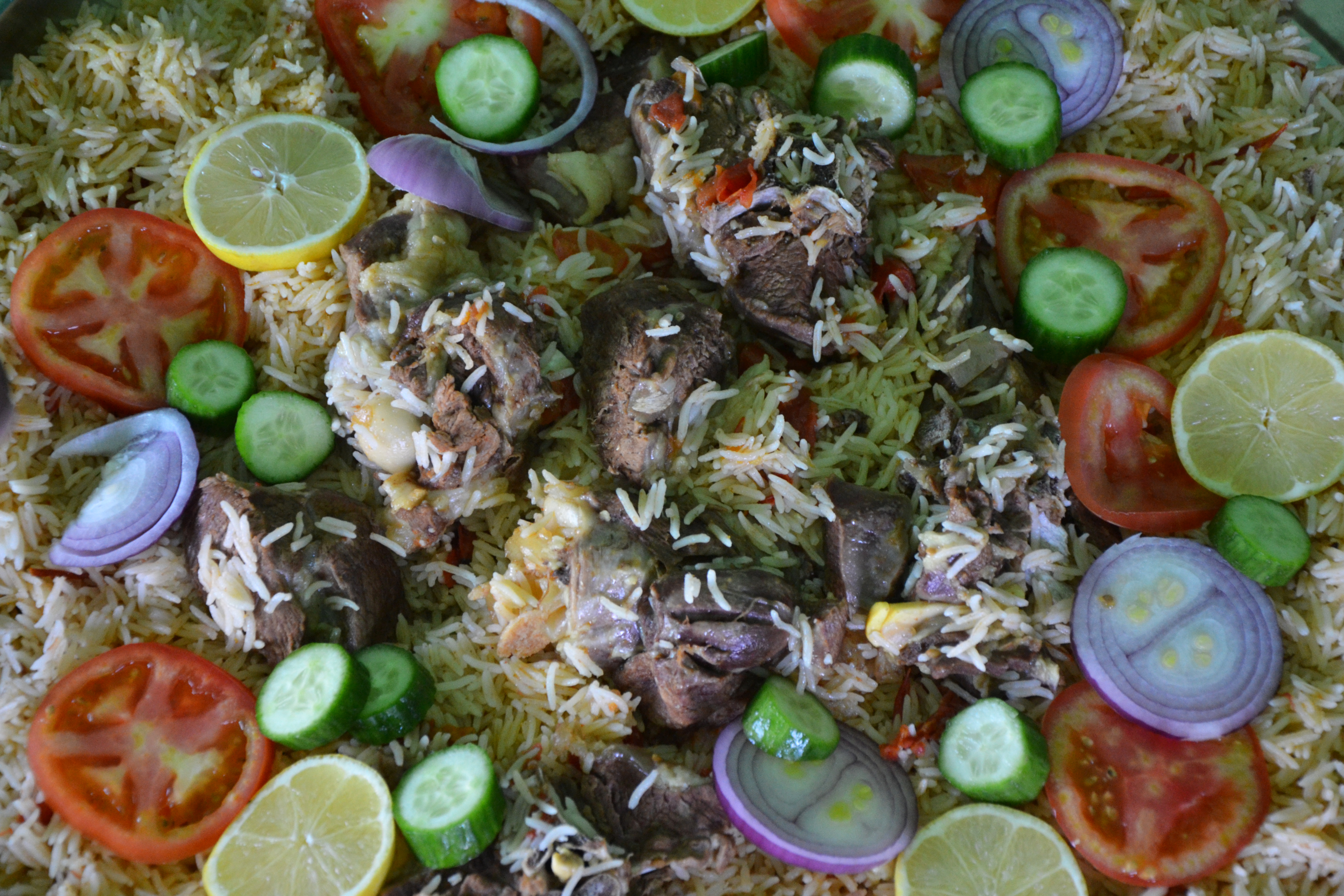
Kabsa

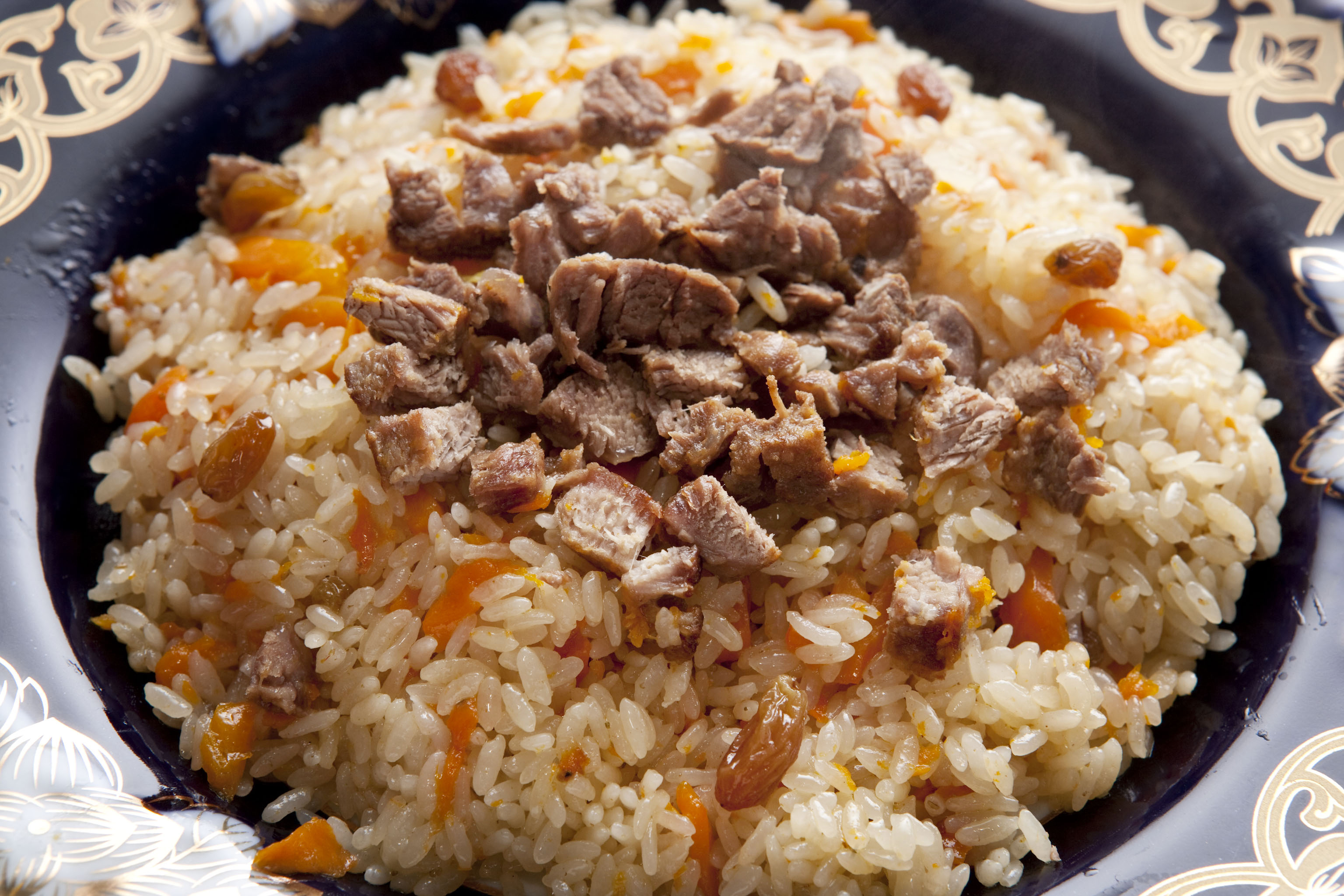
Pilaf

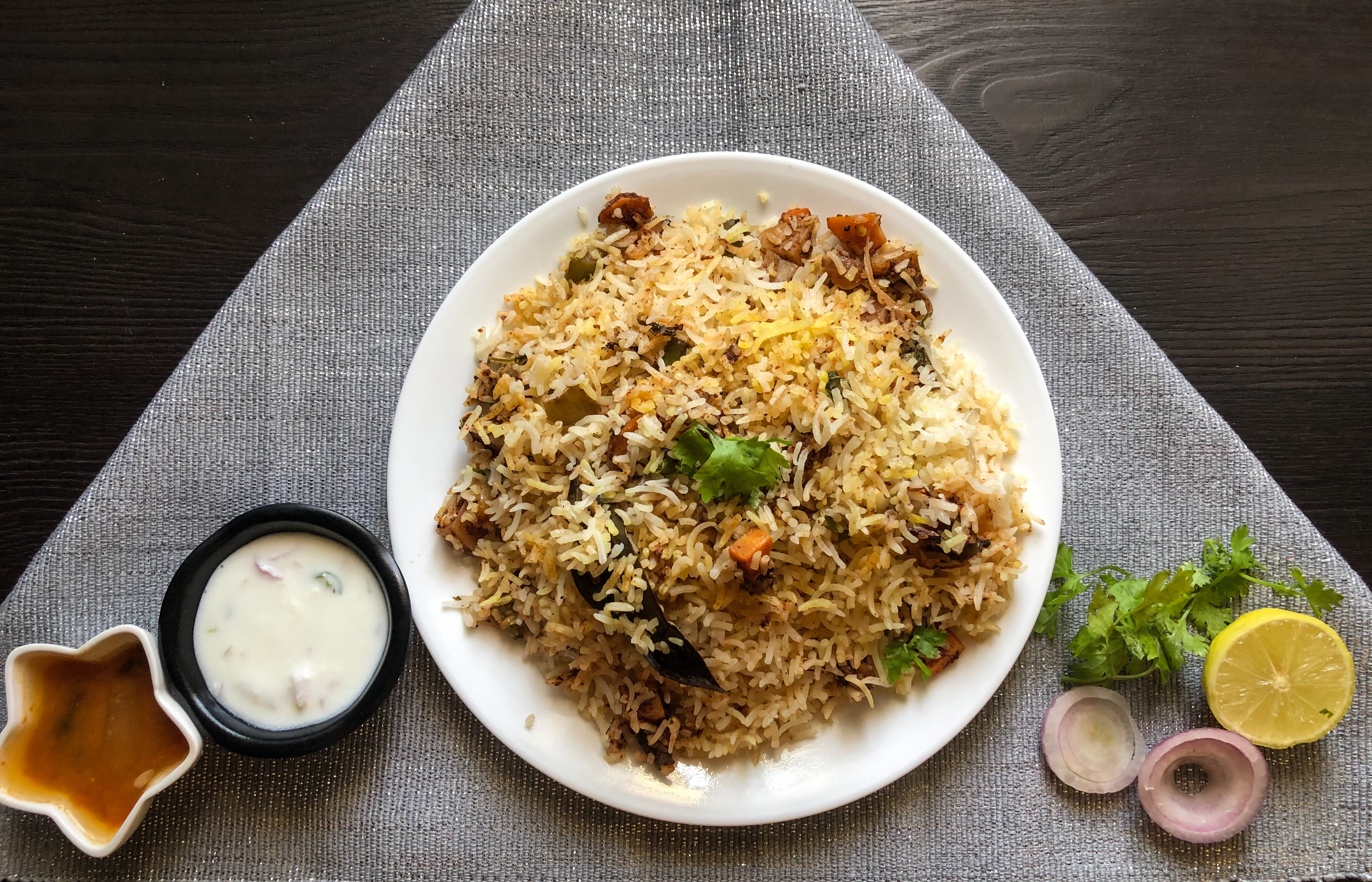
Biryani

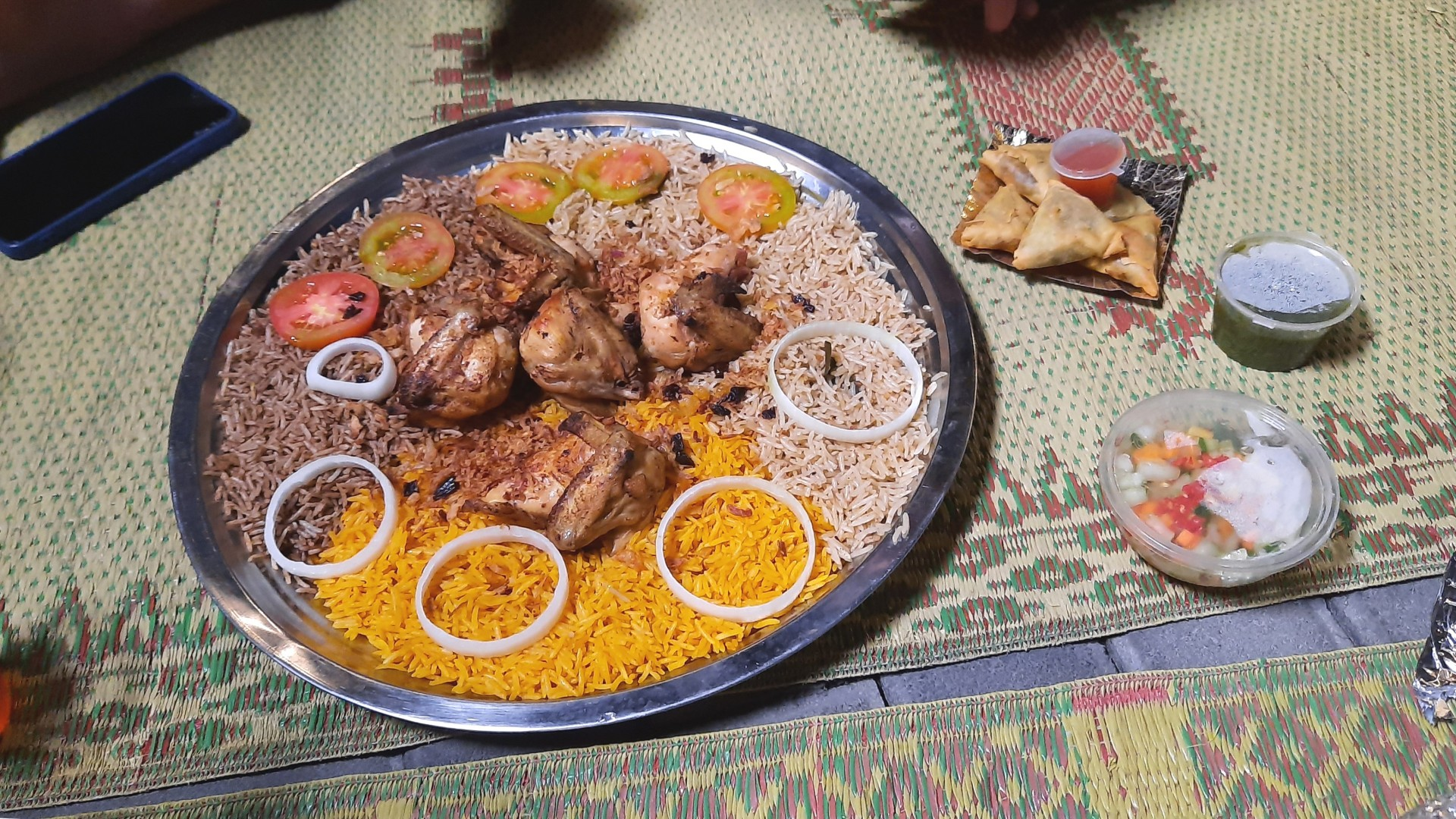
Nasi kebuli

Related spiced rice dishes associated with Middle Eastern, Central Asian and South Asian culinary traditions that potentially influenced the development of nasi minyak.

=== Origins and development ===
The development of nasi minyak is generally associated with historical trade and migration networks linking the Malay world with South Asia and the Middle East. The dish forms part of a broader group of spiced rice preparations influenced by South Asian and Middle Eastern culinary traditions, particularly pilaf, kabsah, biryani and other ghee-based rice dishes. Through these interactions, techniques involving clarified butter, aromatic spices and spiced rice preparation became incorporated into regional Malay cuisine.

Nasi minyak has been linked to the wider development of related dishes such as nasi kebuli, which is associated with Kabuli pilaf traditions introduced through Muslim trading communities in Java, Sumatra and the Malay Peninsula. Other interpretations describe the dish as part of a broader regional adaptation of Indian Ocean spiced rice traditions. Unlike biryani, which is commonly prepared by cooking rice and meat together in layers, nasi minyak is generally served as a separate rice dish accompanied by side dishes.

=== Sumatra and the Riau Archipelago ===
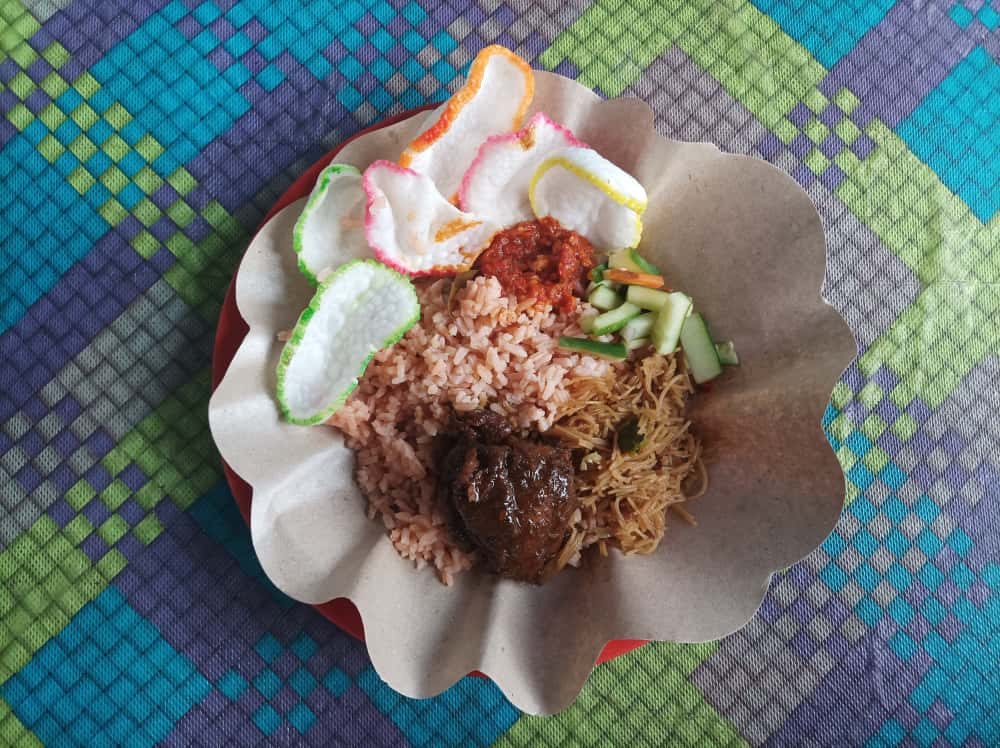
Nasi minyak prepared in the style of Jambi Malay cuisine.

Nasi minyak is traditionally associated with Malay communities in southern Sumatra and the Riau Archipelago, particularly in Palembang and Jambi. In Palembang, the dish was historically associated with the Palembang Sultanate, where it was served during ceremonial occasions, religious observances and receptions for honoured guests. Local traditions also associate nasi minyak with communal dining practices following Friday prayers.

In Palembang, the development of nasi minyak is described in local culinary traditions as reflecting interaction between Malay foodways and Arab merchant communities linked to historic trade networks in the city. Arab settlements along the Musi River, including the Al-Munawar community, are cited in these accounts as having contributed to the introduction and adaptation of spiced rice dishes with Middle Eastern influence. The dish is sometimes compared to kabsa due to similarities in the use of ghee and aromatic spices, although local variants developed distinct characteristics within Palembang culinary traditions.

The dish later became integrated into communal and festive food traditions in Palembang, Jambi and surrounding regions, where it is commonly served during weddings, Islamic celebrations and social gatherings. In the Riau Archipelago, nasi minyak forms part of a wider tradition of ceremonial Malay rice dishes associated with hospitality and festive dining. Regional variations reflect longstanding connections between southern Sumatra, the Malay Peninsula and other parts of the maritime Malay world.

=== Malay Peninsula and Singapore ===
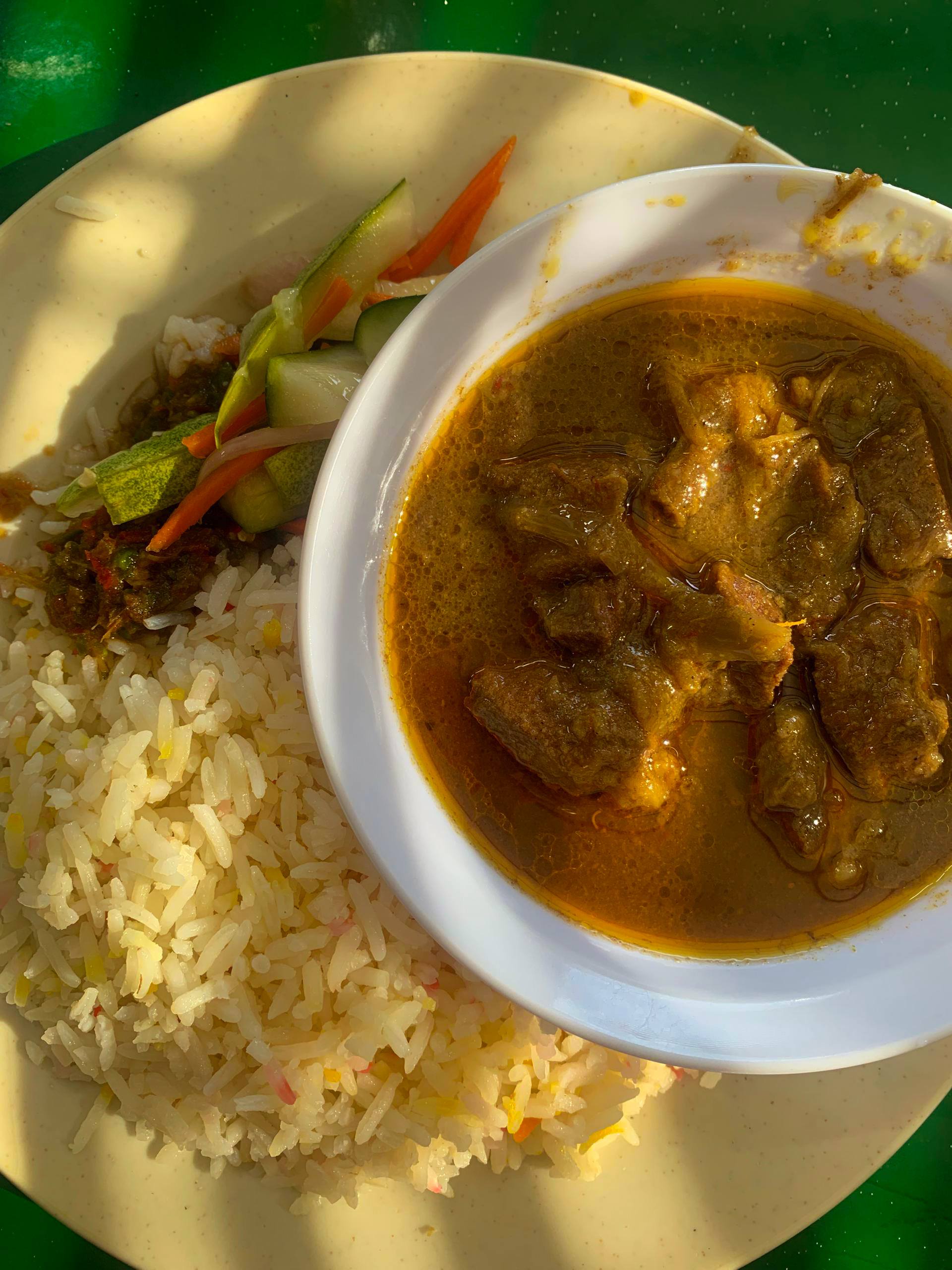
A Terengganu version of Nasi minyak with mutton kurma, served as a breakfast dish

Nasi minyak became established in the Malay Peninsula through Malay elite dining traditions and Muslim trading communities connected to the Johor Sultanate. The dish later became widely associated with weddings, kenduri and religious gatherings throughout the peninsula.

Regional variations found across the peninsula reflect differing combinations of Malay, Hadhrami Arab and Indian Muslim culinary influence. In Johor, one variant of nasi minyak is also known as nasi beriani gam, a spiced rice dish linked to the culinary practices of Tamil Muslim communities originating from southern India. In Penang, the dish forms part of the wider Malay and Indian Muslim food tradition and is sometimes served in nasi kandar establishments. In Kelantan and Terengganu, nasi minyak is also commonly consumed as a breakfast dish. Simpler east coast variants are commonly served with fried chicken, gulai and other local side dishes.

In the southern Thai provinces of Pattani, Yala and Narathiwat, nasi minyak is also known as nasi minyok, reflecting the local Pattani Malay dialect pronunciation. The dish is similarly associated with weddings, kenduri and religious gatherings and is also consumed as a breakfast dish in the region. In Thai, the term is also used interchangeably with khao mok, particularly in reference to southern Thai Muslim rice dishes influenced by Malay and Indian Muslim culinary traditions.

== Preparation and serving ==
=== Preparation ===
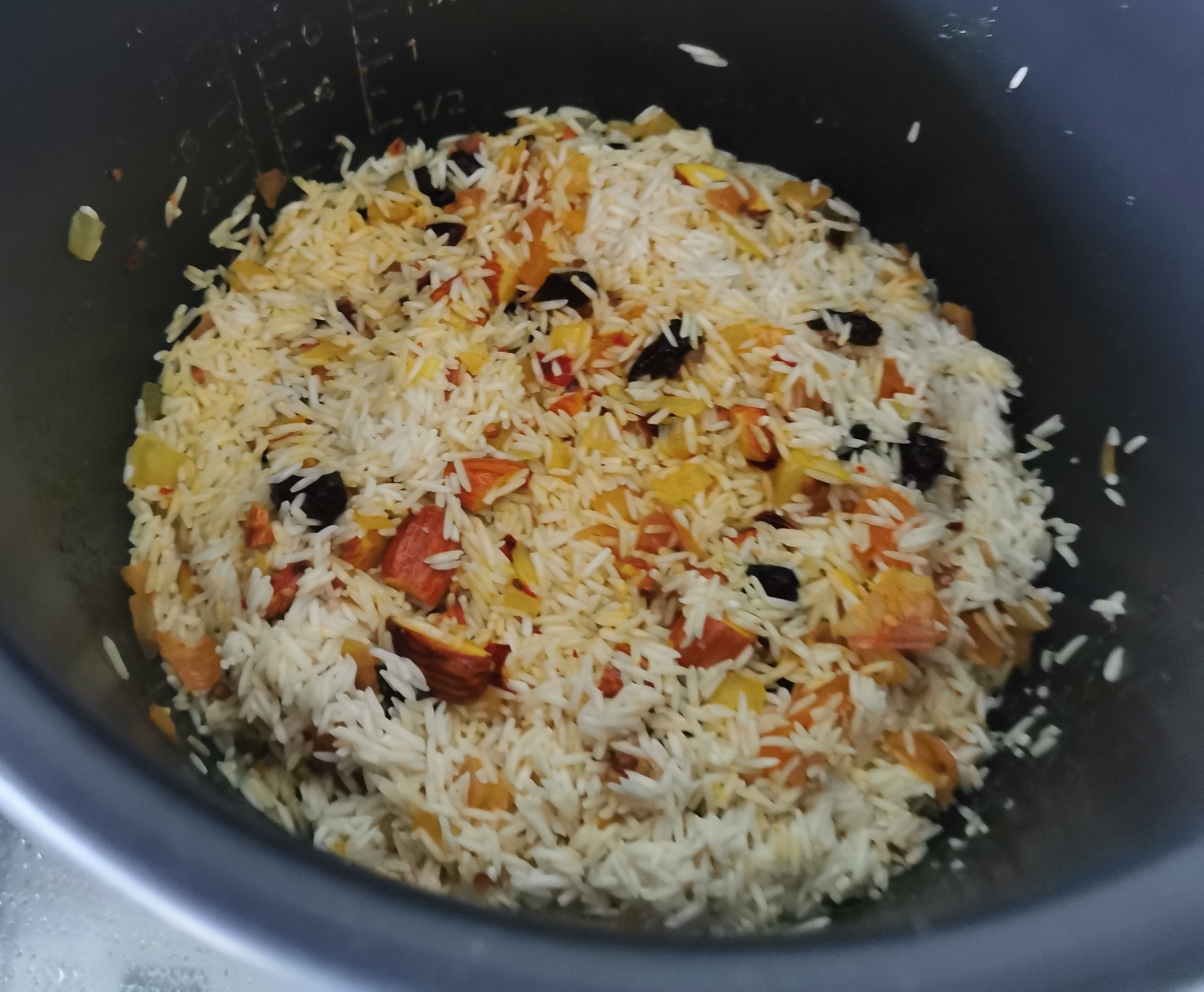
Nasi minyak being prepared with ghee and aromatic spices

Nasi minyak is prepared by cooking rice in ghee (minyak samin or clarified butter) together with a mixture of aromatic spices and seasonings. Commonly used spices include cinnamon, cloves, cardamom, star anise and black pepper, while aromatics such as shallots, garlic, ginger, lemongrass, and pandan leaves are frequently incorporated during cooking.

In the Malay Peninsula, preparation styles differ according to region and social context. Traditional east coast variants found in Kelantan and Terengganu are often characterised by a lighter aromatic profile, with greater emphasis on pandan, lemongrass and milder spice infusions. These versions are commonly consumed as breakfast meals.

=== Variations ===
Regional variations of nasi minyak also differ in appearance and colouring. In southern Sumatra, particularly in Palembang, two common forms are recognised: nasi minyak merah (red nasi minyak) and nasi minyak kuning (yellow nasi minyak). The red variant is coloured with tomato, while the yellow variant derives its colour from turmeric.

In the Malay Peninsula and Singapore, nasi minyak is more commonly prepared in shades ranging from white and pale yellow to deeper yellow or orange tones, depending on the ingredients and preparation style. Some versions are also prepared in multiple colours, known as nasi hujan panas in presentation.

=== Side dishes ===
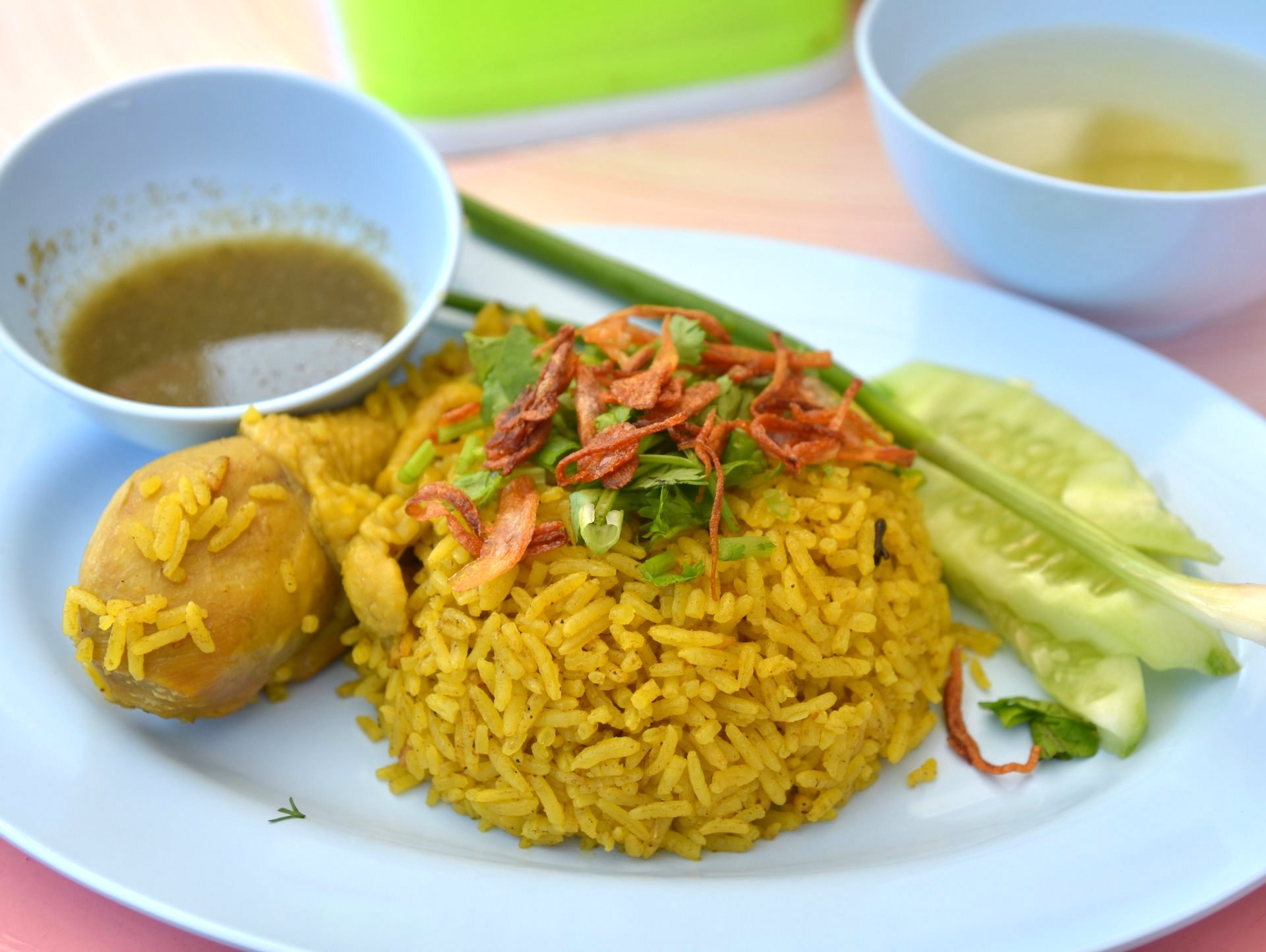
A plate of nasi minyok aye or khao mok kai, a southern Thai Muslim rice dish associated with Patani Malay culinary traditions.

Nasi minyak is usually served with a variety of side dishes such as malbi meat, pentol satay, ayam goreng, pickled cucumber, tahu goreng, krupuk, omelette, raisins, and sambal buah, a spicy sambal with pineapple.

In southern Sumatran cuisine, common accompaniments include beef rendang, chicken curry, gulai daging (beef in spiced coconut gravy), semur (sweet soy-based braised meat stew) and fried chicken dishes such as ayam goreng lengkuas (galangal fried chicken). Other side dishes frequently served alongside nasi minyak include malbi daging (a sweet-spiced beef dish associated with Palembang cuisine), shredded spicy tuna (cakalang suwir), telur balado (eggs in chilli sauce), tahu balado (tofu in chilli sauce) and fried beef lung (paru goreng). In Jambi, tepek ikan (fish and sago cake served with savoury-spicy sauce) is also regarded as a regional accompaniment. The dish is also commonly accompanied by acar (pickled vegetables), acar nanas (pineapple pickle), sambal nanas (pineapple chilli relish) and crackers (kerupuk).

In the Malay Peninsula, nasi minyak is commonly accompanied by meat-based curries and spiced dishes such as daging masak hitam (dark sweet-spiced beef stew), ayam masak merah (chicken in spicy tomato sauce), rendang (slow-cooked spiced meat dish), udang masak diraja (prawns cooked in rich spiced gravy), kurma (mild spiced coconut curry), ayam goreng berempah (spiced fried chicken), ayam percik (grilled chicken with spiced coconut sauce), kambing golek (roast lamb), masak ros (ros-style curry), kuzi (thick aromatic curry) and various forms of gulai or curry preparations. Regional accompaniments also include kerutuk (sweet spiced meat stew) on the east coast and khemok daging (beef in rich spiced coconut gravy), a local beef stew dish, in Terengganu. These dishes are typically served together with acar sayur (pickled vegetables).

== See also ==
- Coconut rice
- Cuisine of Indonesia
- Nasi biryani
- Nasi goreng
- Nasi gurih
- Nasi lemak
- Nasi uduk
- Palembang cuisine
