= Two-dish rice =

Hong Kong meal

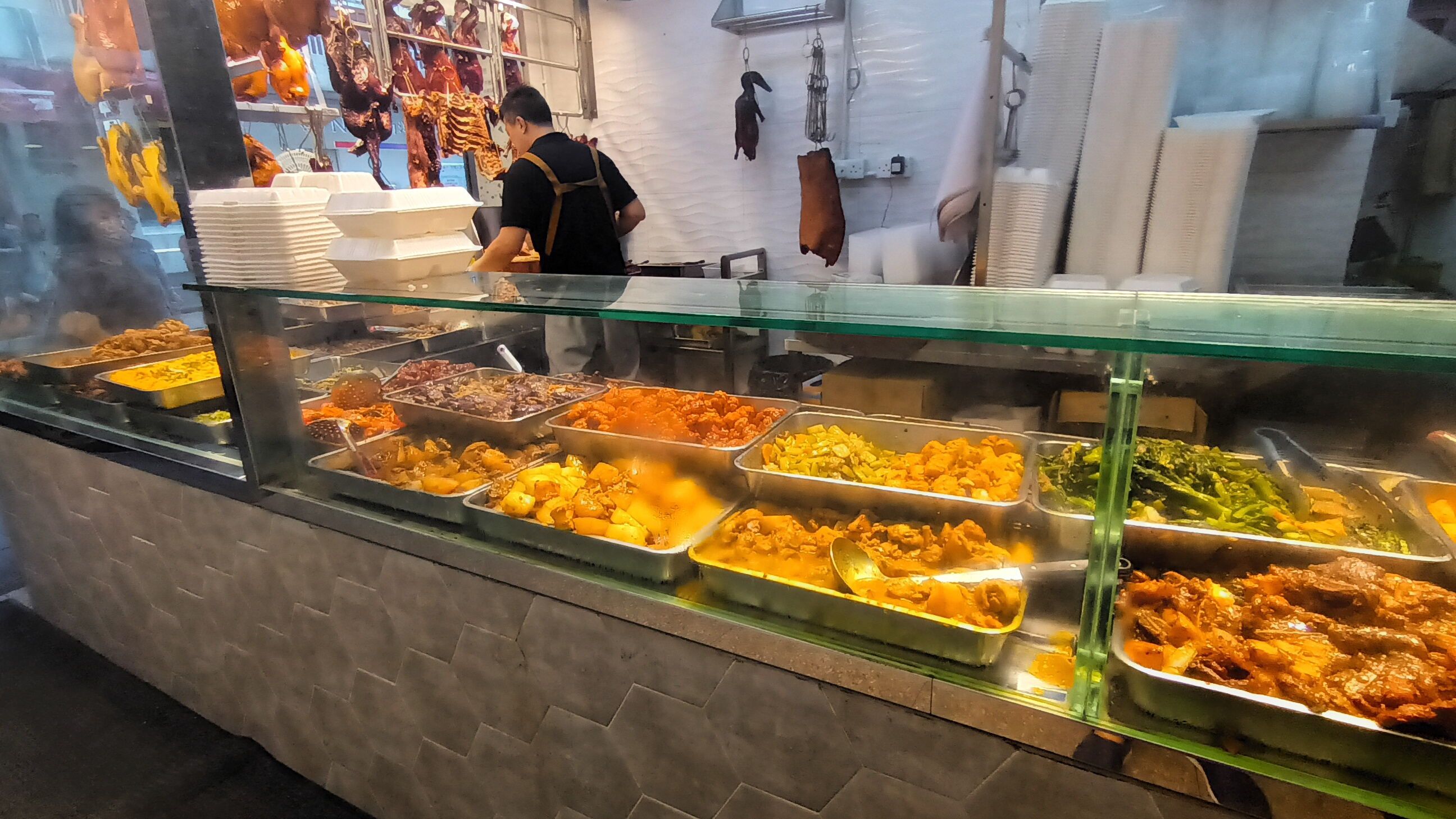
A siu mei restaurant in Hong Kong that sells two‑dish rice places the dishes in glass cabinets for customers to choose from

Two‑dish rice (Chinese: 兩餸飯; Cantonese: Léung seung faan), also translated as rice with two sides, or this this rice, is a popular, affordable Hong Kong takeaway meal consisting of a large portion of white rice paired with two chosen side dishes from a wide selection of pre-cooked options.

== Overview ==
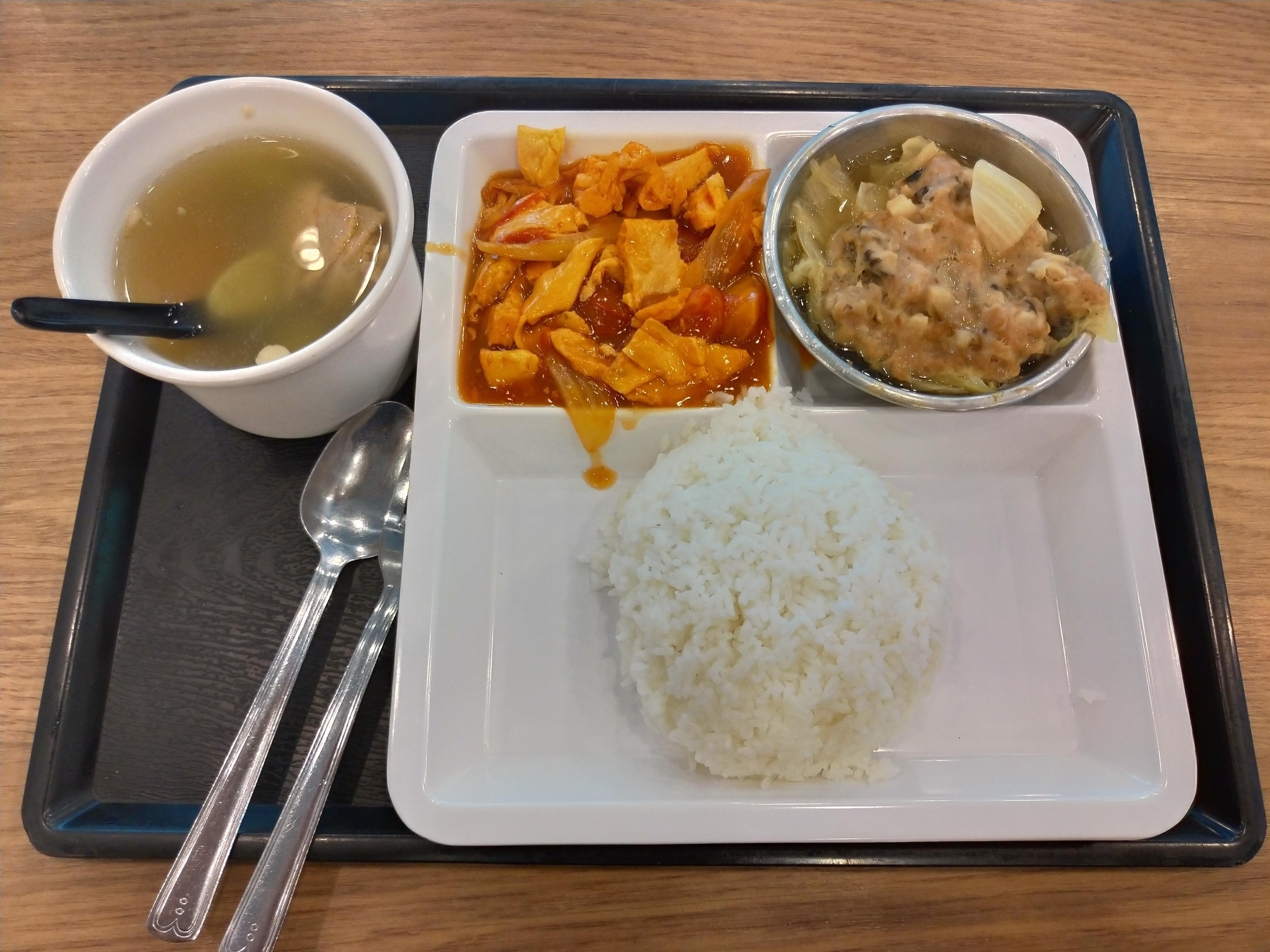
A two‑dish rice set with squid steam minced pork, tomato and seasonal vegetables with rice and soup. In 1990s, some fast food restaurants in Hong Kong use special square plates to serve two‑dish rice. They can be placed in a small plate with dishes according to the customer's choice.

Two-dish rice is not a new thing. This is reminiscent of the 1950s, when open-air food stalls were an important lifeline for the city's poor. In the post-WWII era, Hong Kong experienced a massive influx of refugees and migrants. Open-air stalls emerged as a temporary policy to feed the booming, low-income population.

Rice with two sides emerged as a grassroots staple in Hong Kong during the 1960s. Originally known as a poor man’s meal, it was designed to be an affordable, filling option for blue-collar workers, students, and lower-income individuals. The concept gained widespread popularity in factory canteens and small stalls near schools, where it was prized for being cheap, decent quality, and straightforward, often described as good value for money (平靚正; pronounced Peng Leng Jeng in Cantonese). The meal typically consists of a large portion of rice paired with two selected Cantonese side dishes.

Two‑dish rice was popular for a while after the severe acute respiratory syndrome (SARS) epidemic spread to Hong Kong in February 2003. At that time, the epidemic expanded and no customers entered the restaurant. In addition to two-dish rice takeaway shops, some restaurants sold two-dish rice boxes instead.

== Feature ==
=== Service hours ===
Shops that only sell two-dish rice usually only serve lunch and dinner, and rarely offer breakfast or afternoon tea.

=== Ordering method ===
Shops that primarily sell two-dish rice usually display various side dishes in a transparent window, allowing customers to easily see if there are any dishes they like to buy. After a customer orders, the staff will immediately put the selected dishes into a rice container or plate containing white rice. The customer pays and can then take the rice container away or eat in.

In Hong Kong, some fast-food restaurants use specially designed square plates to serve two different dishes and rice. Smaller plates containing the side dishes can be added according to the customer's choice.

These two‑dish rice shops typically offer at least ten different side dishes, with nearly half of them changing daily to reduce the chance of eating the same dishes repeatedly and prevent customer fatigue. Furthermore, the rice and side dishes are usually packed so full that the entire container is filled, making customers feel they are getting a generous portion and good value for money.

Compared with restaurants such as cha chaan tengs, dai pai dongs, and Hong Kong–style fast‑food shops, two‑dish rice shops prepare their dishes in advance and keep cooking and replenishing similar items throughout the lunch and dinner periods. Customers can simply choose from the cooked dishes directly with the server, without needing to wait for the kitchen to prepare the order, queue at the drinks counter, or wait for a number to be called to collect their meal.

Customers can quickly complete the process from ordering and paying to picking up their food at two-dish rice shop, saving them the time of queuing for their meals. However, some popular two-dish rice shop specialties may require customers to queue outside the store during lunch and dinner hours to order and pay, sometimes resulting in long queues.

== Competition ==
In 2025, Simon Wong Ka‑wo, chairman of the Hong Kong Federation of Restaurants and Related Trades, stated that there were around 1,200 establishments offering two‑dish rice. This figure differs significantly from the long‑running Hong Kong Two‑Dish Rice Facebook group, which reports 678 shops. The gap stems from the fact that the two sources define two‑dish rice shops differently.

Besides dedicated two‑dish rice shops, many food businesses have begun offering two‑dish rice in response to Hong Kong’s economic downturn after the pandemic. Their operating model, however, differs from that of specialised two‑dish rice shops. These include restaurants that have partially transformed their operations—for example, Chinese banquet restaurants adding two‑dish takeaway counters, fast‑food chains introducing two‑dish rice options, cha chaan teng offering two‑dish set meals, and even bakery chains (e.g. Saint Honore cake shop) entering the market with Korean‑style two‑dish rice sets.

=== Value for money ===
Most shops selling two‑dish rice allow customers to pay a small surcharge to choose additional items. A “three‑dish rice” set simply refers to a lunchbox containing three small dishes plus rice.

Compared with other affordable eateries serving the lower‑ and middle‑income population, such as cha chaan teng and Hong Kong‑style fast‑food chains, two‑dish rice shops offer similar meals at a much lower price, though the quality varies from shop to shop.

Although buying "dishes only" (without rice) is more expensive than a standard two‑dish lunchbox, the portion size of a "dishes only" box is noticeably larger. When paired with rice cooked at home, the dishes can be shared among family members.

Because two‑dish rice is cheap and filling, it has become the default lunch and dinner choice for unemployed individuals and low‑income earners. Even working families increasingly prefer buying ready‑cooked two‑dish rice: with rising prices for market and supermarket ingredients, the cost of buying groceries and cooking at home can exceed the price of purchasing a two‑dish rice set to eat at home.

== Dishes ==
The dishes served in the two‑dish rice are mostly common Hong Kong-style and Cantonese side dishes, such as stir-fried cabbage, choy sum, cauliflower or broccoli, steamed pork patties with dried squid or salted egg, fish chunks with corn, steamed water egg, pork knuckles with fermented bean curd, scrambled eggs with tomatoes, sweet and sour pork, pork belly, spicy eggplants with minced pork, curry chicken, lemon chicken, vegetarian dish, braised pork with preserved mustard greens, stir-fried chicken balls with fermented black beans, stir-fried pork slices with luffa or zucchini, Chi qua with vermicelli and dried shrimp, salt and pepper pork chops, etc. There are also many dishes from other cuisines, such as Mapo tofu and eggplant with fish flavor. Some restaurants also offer fried rice and noodles.

== Cultural influence ==
Former U.S. Consul General in Hong Kong Gregory May reportedly visited a two‑dish rice shop in Wan Chai and lined up with locals, making the two‑dish rice popular among middle-class and office workers. He posted on Facebook, hashtagged #ThisThisRice and praised the meal as "so tasty and affordable."

In recent years, the consumption patterns of mainland tourists have changed, and they often choose to eat two-dish rice which are cheaper.

== See also ==
- Cart noodle
- Economy rice (Singapore, Malaysia and Indonesia)
- Cơm bình dân (Vietnam)
