= Nasi campur =

Indonesian and Malay rice dish

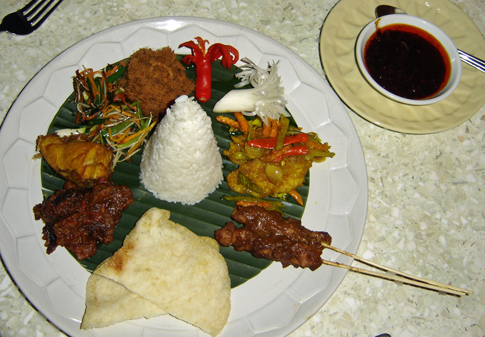
- Nasi campur served at the Mandarin Oriental Hotel Majapahit, Surabaya, East Java
- Alternative names: Nasi rames
- Course: Main course
- Place of origin: Maritime Southeast Asia
- Associated cuisine: Indonesia, Malaysia, Brunei, Singapore and southern Thailand
- Serving temperature: Hot or room temperature
- Main ingredients: Rice with various side dishes
- Variations: Nasi campur Bali, nasi padang, nasi rames, nasi kandar, rijsttafel (Indo)
- Other information: Also popular in the Netherlands

Nasi campur (Indonesian and Malay for 'mixed rice'; Malay pronunciation: [ˌnasi ˈt͡ʃampʊr]), also known as nasi rames (Javanese: ꦤꦱꦶꦫꦩꦼꦱ꧀, romanized: nasi raměs, lit. 'mixed rice') or sega campur (Javanese: ꦱꦼꦒꦕꦩ꧀ꦥꦸꦂ, romanized: sěgå campur; [səˌgɔ ˈtʃampʊr]) in Java, refers to an Indonesian and Malay dish of a scoop of nasi putih (white rice) accompanied by small portions of several other dishes, including meats, vegetables, peanuts, eggs, and fried-shrimp krupuk.

Depending on the origin, a nasi campur vendor might serve several side dishes, including vegetables, fish, and meat. It is a staple meal from Indonesia, Malaysia, Singapore, Brunei, and southern Thailand, and also popular in the Netherlands through its colonial ties with Indonesia.

This concept has parallels across Asia and the Pacific: in Thailand, it is known as khao kaeng (Thai: ข้าวแกง), and in Vietnam as cơm bình dân. In the Philippines, the carinderia offers a similar meal style, and in Japan, it is called ichijū-sansai. Similarly, in Hawaii, it is known as the plate lunch, and in the Mariana Islands, it is referred to as the "fiesta plate". However, in the Indonesian and Malay-speaking regions, the term nasi campur is the most commonly recognized name for this style of meal.

== Origin ==
Nasi campur is a ubiquitous dish around Indonesia and as diverse as the Indonesian archipelago itself, with regional variations. There is no exact rule, recipe, or definition of what makes nasi campur, since Indonesians and, by and large, Southeast Asians commonly consume steamed rice, added with side dishes consisting of vegetables and meat. As a result, the question of origin or recipe is obscure. Yet, nasi campur is commonly perceived as steamed rice surrounded with dishes that might consist of vegetables and meats, served in personal portions, in contrast to tumpeng that is served in larger collective portions or rijsttafel that was presented in lavish colonial banquets.

In most cases, nasi campur refers specifically to the Indonesian and Malay versions of rice with assortments of side dishes. In Indonesia, it refers to any type of rice surrounded by various side dishes. In Malaysia and Brunei, it commonly refers to Malay mixed rice. However, the term can also encompass non-Malay versions like Nasi campur Cina, nasi campur Orang Ulu, and nasi campur Iban, among others.

In Japan, the United States, and most foreign countries, nasi campur often refers to the Balinese version, while in the Netherlands it most often refers to Indo-colonial nasi rames. The side dishes themselves might vary widely among regions and eating establishments.

== Variations ==
There are several local variations throughout Southeast Asia, from Java, Bali, the Malay Peninsula, Borneo, Sulawesi, Papuan, and Indo-colonial to Chinese Indonesian versions of nasi campur.

=== Balinese ===
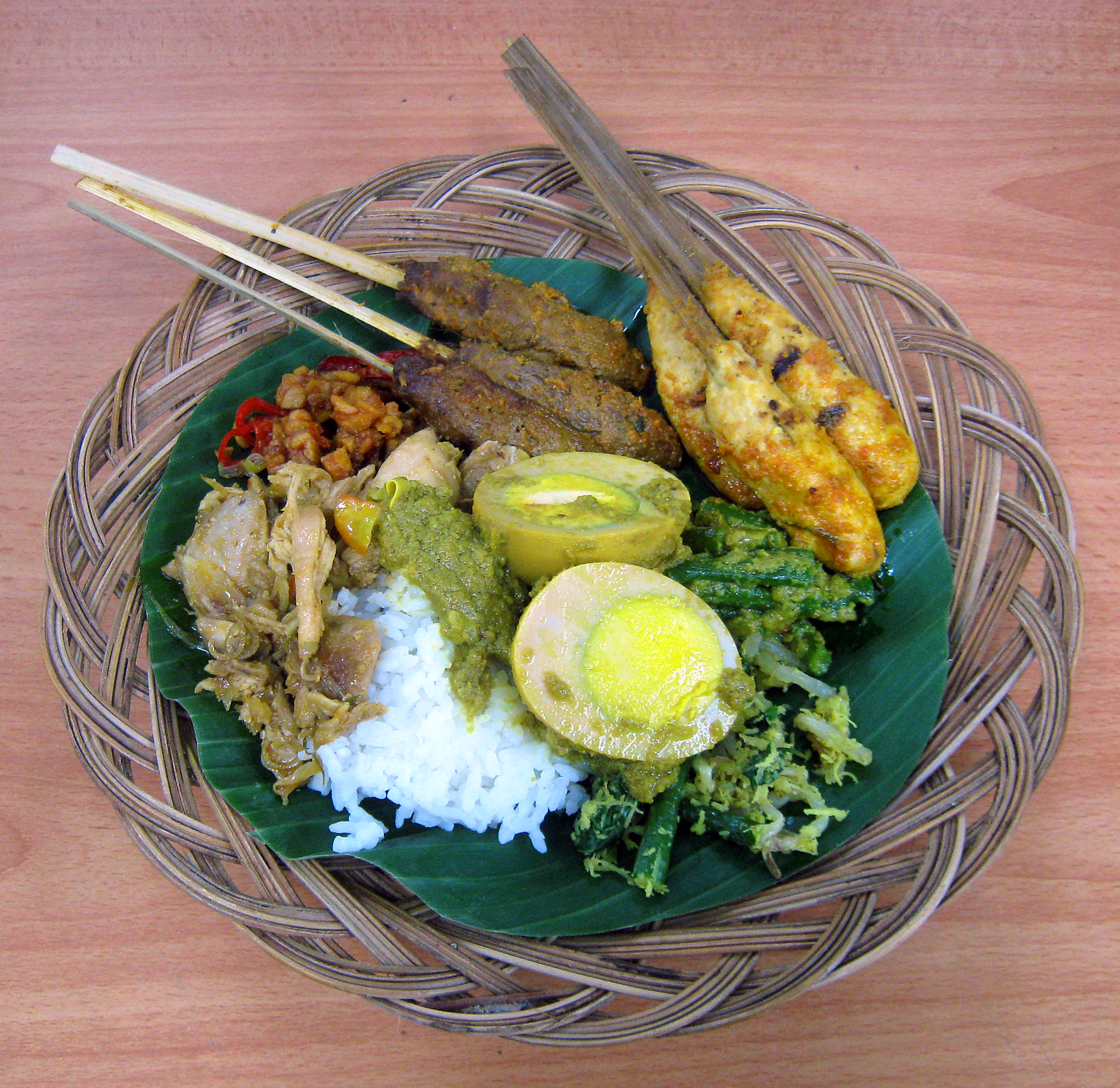
Nasi campur Balinese version with two types of sate lilit, egg and vegetables

In Bali, the mixed rice, called nasi campur Bali or simply nasi Bali, is a favorite among tourists. This Balinese version of nasi campur is probably the most internationally well-known version, mostly due to the "Bali factor". That is the Balinese popularity as the island resort among international visitors. The tastes are often distinctly local, punctuated by basa genep (lit. complete spices), the typical Balinese spice mix used as the base for many curry and vegetable dishes. The Balinese version of mixed rice may have grilled tuna, fried tofu, cucumber, spinach, tempeh, beef cubes, vegetable curry, corn, and chilli sauce on the bed of rice. Mixed rice is often wrapped in a banana leaf and sold by street vendors.

As a Hindu-majority island, the Balinese version might add lawar and babi guling in their nasi campur fares. Nevertheless, the halal version is available, with ayam betutu, sate lilit, and eggs to accompany the rice.

=== Javanese ===
In Java, nasi campur is often called nasi rames (Javanese: ꦤꦱꦶꦫꦩꦼꦱ꧀, lit. 'mixed rice') and wide variations are available across the island. One dish that is usually found in a Javanese nasi campur is fried noodles. The combination known as nasi rames is a dish created in West Java during World War II by the Indo (Eurasian) cook, Truus van der Capellen, who ran the Bandung soup kitchens during (and after) the Japanese occupation. Later, she opened a restaurant in the Netherlands and made the dish equally popular there.

In Yogyakarta a Javanese version of nasi campur is called nasi ingkung, which consists of a whole cooked chicken dish called ayam ingkung, urapan kasultan, perkedel, empal gapit, sate tusuk jiwo, and tumpeng rice. Another notable version of nasi rames is nasi kucing, which is typically served in smaller portions.

=== Indonesian Chinese ===
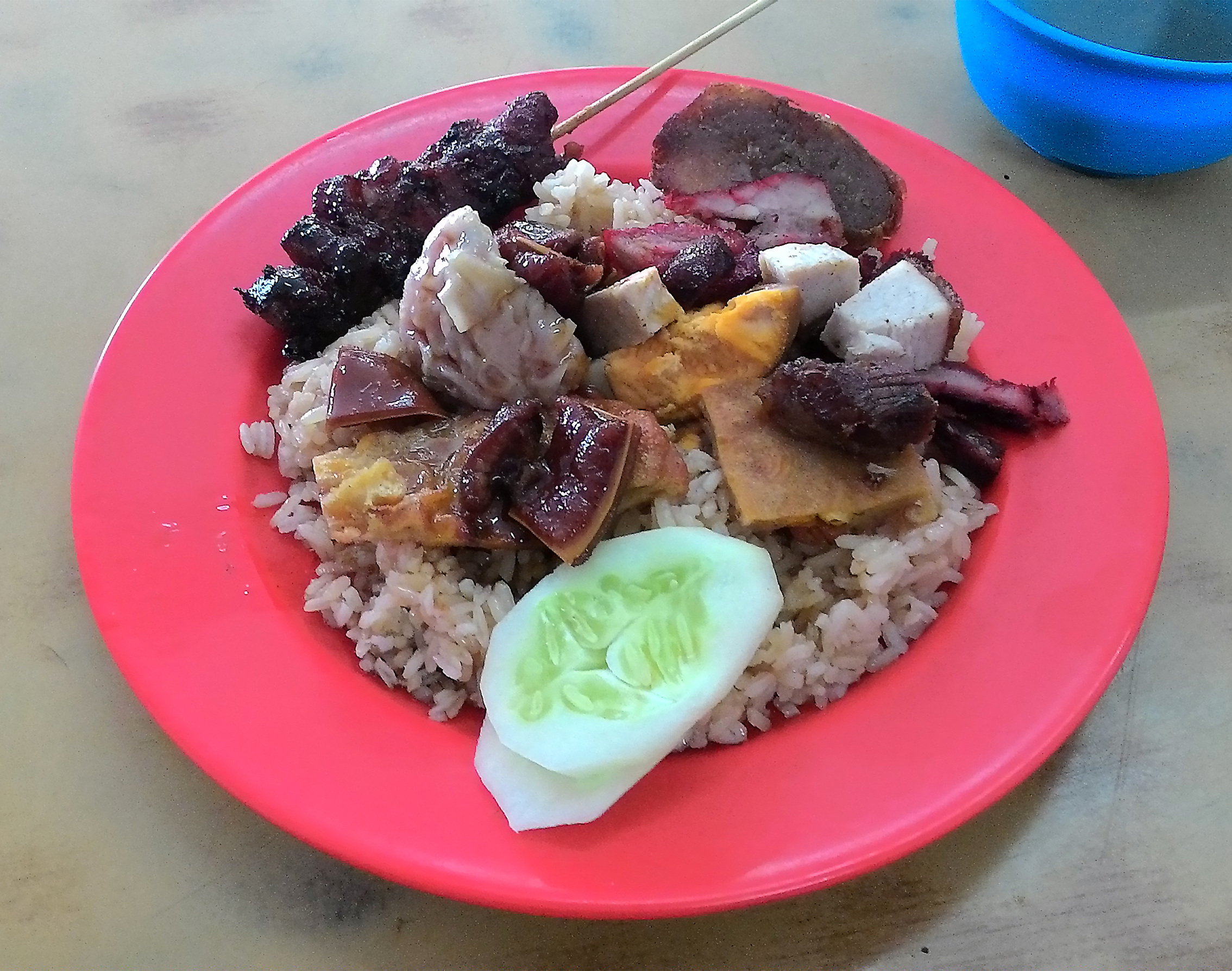
Nasi campur, Chinese Indonesian version

The name nasi campur Tionghoa is only a shortened version of "nasi dengan daging campur cara Tionghoa" (i.e. "rice with an assortment of Chinese-style meats"). Furthermore, most Chinese vendors and food-court stalls in the region serve only one kind of meat with rice and a bowl of broth; patrons have to order different meats as separate dishes or add-ons. Hence, in most cases, those Chinese vendors' menu refers to the specific meat accompanying plain rice, for example, char siew rice or roast pork rice. The nasi campur Tionghoa, in this respect, is the combo set menu of various Chinese barbecued meats.

Some people who reside in Jakarta and other major cities with a significant Chinese population area use the term nasi campur loosely to refer to Chinese Indonesian's nasi campur Tionghoa (i.e., Chinese-styled nasi campur), a dish of rice with an assortment of barbecued meats, such as char siew, crispy roast pork, sweet pork sausage, and pork satay. This dish is usually served with simple Chinese chicken soup or sayur asin, an Indonesian clear broth of pork bones with fermented mustard greens. However, a name for a similar dish does not exist in mainland China, Singapore, Malaysia, or even most other areas of Indonesia outside of Jakarta.

=== Minangkabau ===
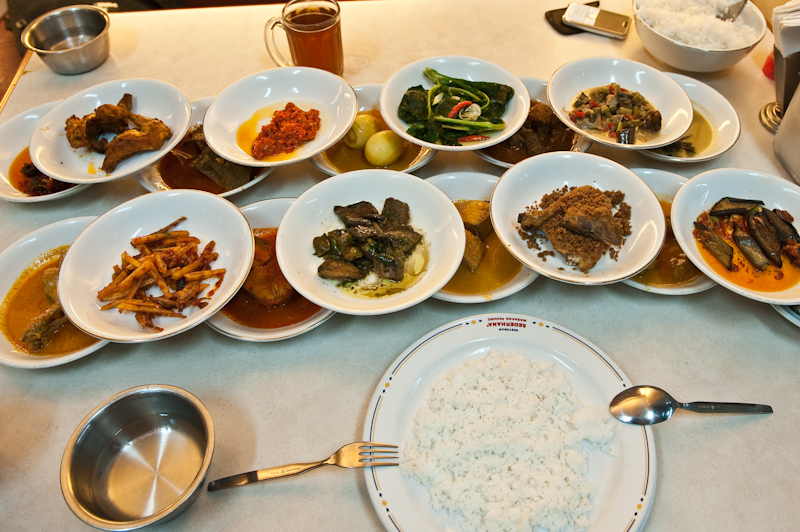
Nasi padang in Bukittinggi, West Sumatra

Nasi Padang is a quintessential dish of Minangkabau food culture originating from West Sumatra, Indonesia. It consists of steamed rice accompanied by a variety of pre-cooked dishes, including meats, fish, vegetables, and spicy sambals. Named after the city of Padang, Padang restaurants are easily recognizable by their traditional Rumah Gadang architecture and vibrant window displays featuring carefully arranged bowls of dishes. The serving styles vary, with smaller establishments typically using the "pesan" method, allowing customers to select their desired dishes, while larger restaurants employ the "hidang" method, presenting a banquet-style assortment of dishes served directly to patrons. A related dish, Nasi Kapau, hails from Nagari Kapau in Bukittinggi and is often described as the Minangkabau version of mixed rice. In Nasi Kapau stalls, customers choose from a wide selection of dishes presented in large bowls. In both dining styles, it is common to eat with one's hands, often using a kobokan—a bowl of water with lime—to cleanse the hands before and after the meal.

Nasi Padang and nasi kapau feature a diverse array of dishes, showcasing the rich culinary heritage of the Minangkabau people. Typically served with steamed rice, popular accompaniments include gulai cubadak (unripe jackfruit curry) and boiled cassava leaves. Other offerings encompass a variety of gulai, such as rendang (spicy stewed beef), gulai ayam (chicken curry) and an assortment of offal dishes like gulai tunjang (cow foot tendons) and gulai ati (cow liver). The menu may also include fried options like ayam goreng (fried chicken) and baluik goreng (fried eel), alongside sambals and unique items like dendeng balado (crispy beef with chilli) and ikan asam padeh (spicy-sour fish).

=== Malay ===
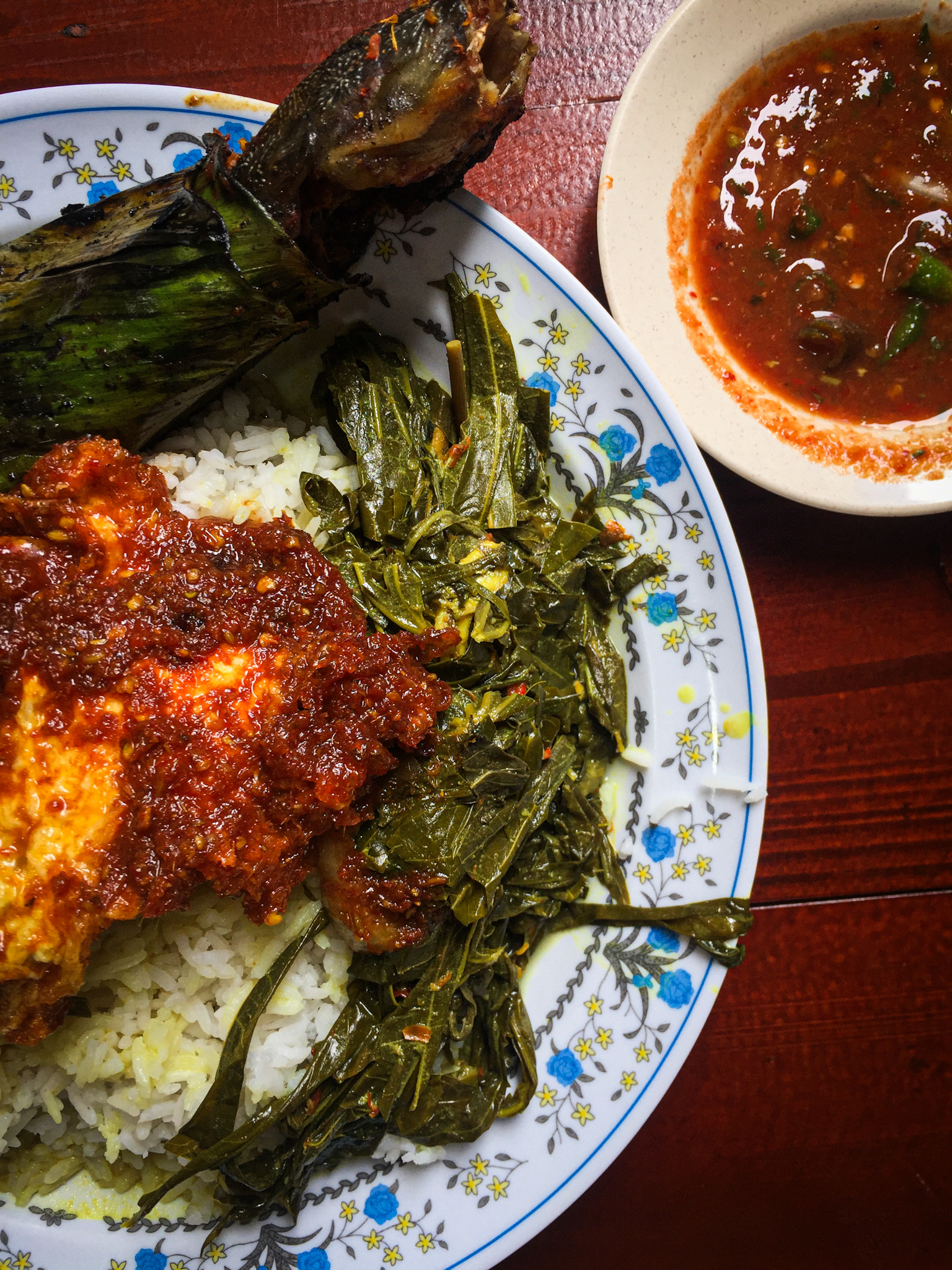
One of the classic renditions of a Malay nasi campur - Ikan Keli Bakar (grilled catfish) wrapped in banana leaves, served with Air Asam (a tangy dipping sauce), Pucuk Ubi Masak Lemak (cassava leaves cooked in coconut milk) and Sambal Telur (eggs in spicy sambal sauce).

The Malay Nasi campur is the most prevalent version of nasi campur in Malaysia and Brunei. It is also popular in nearby areas, such as Singapore, southern Thailand and certain Malay regions of Indonesia, including the eastern and southern coasts of Sumatra and parts of West Kalimantan. In Kelantan and Pattani, this dish is also known as Nasi Berlauk, while in Penang, it is referred to as Nasi Melayu.

This version typically features a base of steamed white rice accompanied by a diverse selection of side dishes, such as curries, grilled meats, vegetables, and sambals. The dishes found in a typical Malay Nasi Campur are known for their bold and aromatic flavors, achieved through the use of traditional spices and herbs. Rich curries, such as gulai ikan (fish curry), kari ayam (chicken curry), and the rendang daging (beef rendang), are frequently featured, alongside grilled or fried proteins like ikan bakar (grilled fish) and ayam goreng berempah (spiced fried chicken). Vegetables, either stir-fried or blanched, add freshness and texture, with options like kangkong (water spinach), eggplant with sambal and long beans being particularly popular. A variety of sambals, notably sambal belacan made with shrimp paste, adds a distinctive spicy and umami depth. Additional items such as fried tempeh, tofu, hard-boiled eggs, and pickled vegetables round out the plate with extra flavor and variety. Commonly served in a casual, self-service manner, Nasi Campur allows diners to build their plates from a buffet-like display, creating a balanced meal in a single serving.

=== Malaysian-Singaporean Chinese ===
Economy rice (simplified Chinese: 经济饭; traditional Chinese: 經濟飯; pinyin: jīngjì fàn; Jyutping: ging1 zai3 faan6; Pe̍h-ōe-jī: keng-chè-pn̄g), also known as Nasi Campur Cina (Chinese mixed rice) is a popular meal option in hawker centers, food courts, and street vendors across Malaysia and Singapore. In Singapore, it is known locally as cai png in Hokkien, while in Malaysia, it is known as chap fan in Cantonese. Featuring a wide array of cooked dishes served with steamed white rice, this economical meal option offers affordability and variety, with stalls typically displaying 10 to 15 choices, including meats, vegetables, eggs, and tofu. Customers select their preferred combination, often adding curry to the rice, creating a simple yet customizable meal similar to the Malay or Indonesian nasi campur. Thought of as a form of "home-cooked" food among Chinese Malaysians, Singaporeans and Bruneians, economy rice stalls provide an affordable meal choice that reflects the comforts and flavors of a traditional Chinese family meal.

=== Other regional variations ===
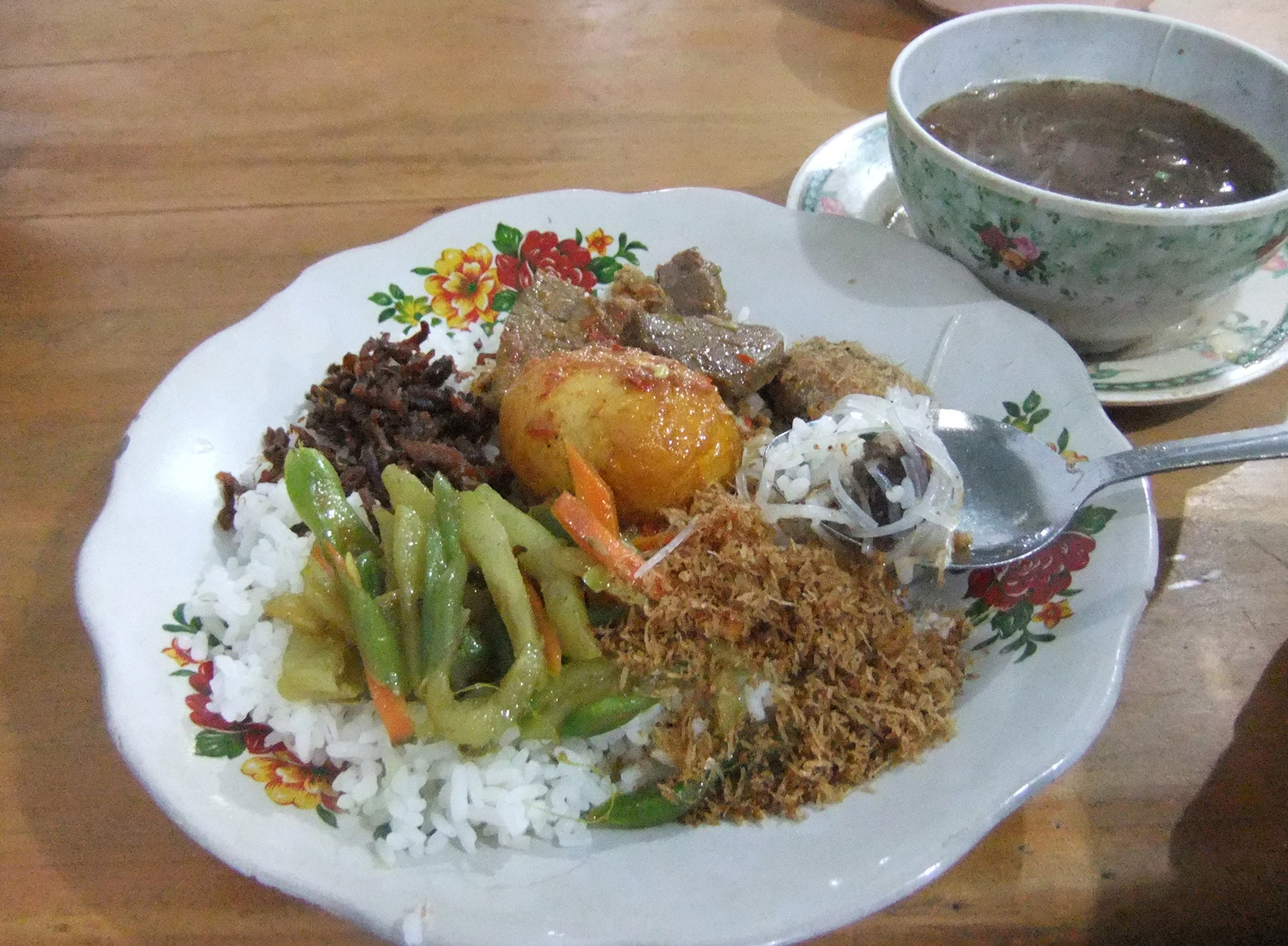
Nasi campur with buffalo soup, served in Tana Toraja, South Sulawesi

In addition to the Javanese, Balinese, Minangkabau, Chinese and Malay communities, various indigenous groups in Indonesia, Malaysia and Brunei have developed their own interpretations of nasi campur. Groups including the Acehnese, Batak, Sundanese, Dayak, Banjar, Bugis-Makassar and Manado offer unique variations in their side dishes, illustrating that nasi campur does not adhere to a uniform set of accompaniments.

For instance, Acehnese nasi campur may include ayam tangkap, a dish featuring fried chicken marinated with aromatic herbs. Batak versions often feature saksang, a spicy pork dish made with rich spices, and naniura, a traditional dish of raw fish marinated in a mixture of herbs and spices, which reflects the region’s access to fresh ingredients and a strong culinary tradition centered around bold flavors.

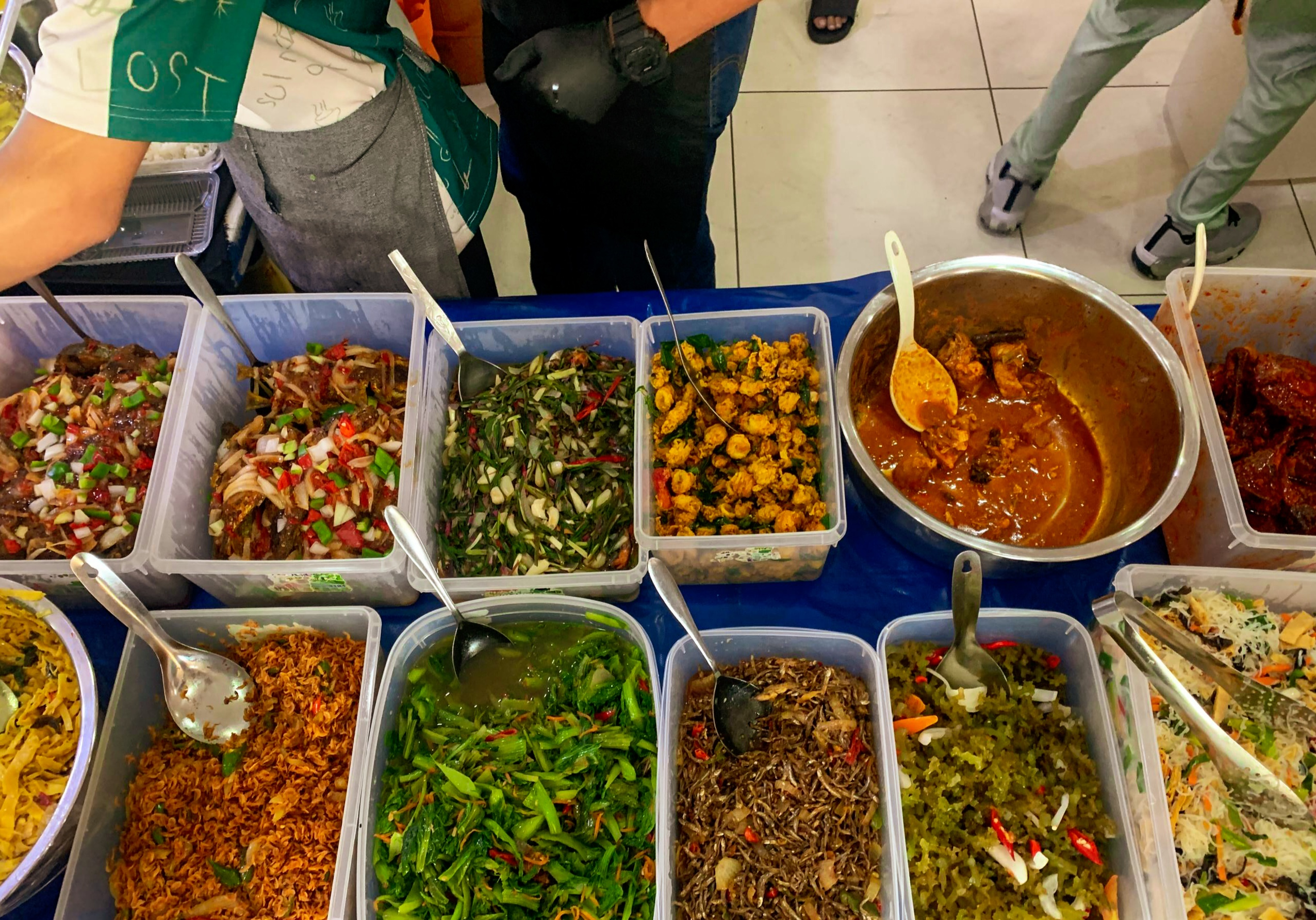
A nasi campur stall in Queen Elizabeth Hospital, Kota Kinabalu, Sabah, offering a variety of traditional Bajau and Bruneian dishes

Sundanese nasi campur typically emphasizes fresh raw vegetables served alongside sambal, a spicy chilli paste, complementing dishes like ikan bakar, or grilled fish. This approach highlights the Sundanese preference for freshness and simplicity in their meals. Meanwhile, in Dayak cuisine, one may find wild boar or river fish featured prominently. This reflects the Dayak community’s connection to the natural resources available in their environment.

Toraja dishes offer their own unique flair, often including pa’piong, which consists of grilled meat wrapped in banana leaves. Lastly, Manado nasi campur is characterized by ikan bakar rica, a grilled fish dish known for its spicy sauce, accompanied by a variety of sambals that enhance the overall flavor profile.

Overall, these interpretations of nasi campur demonstrate the culinary traditions of each community, highlighting the different flavors and ingredients associated with this dish across the region. Each variation reflects local culture, available ingredients, and historical influences, contributing to the overall diversity of nasi campur.

== Gallery ==
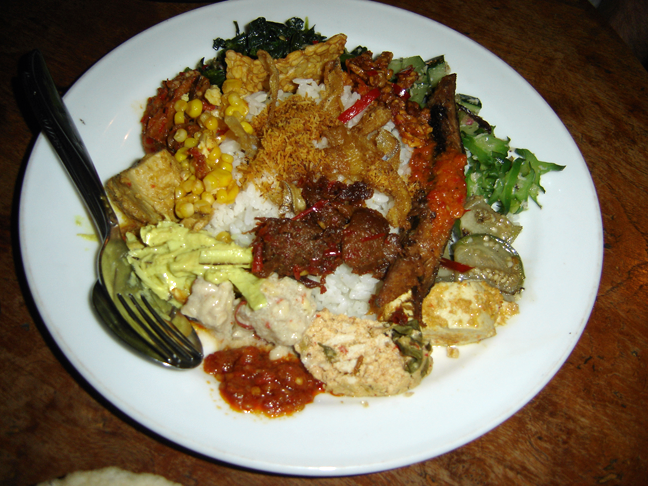
Nasi campur, Balinese version

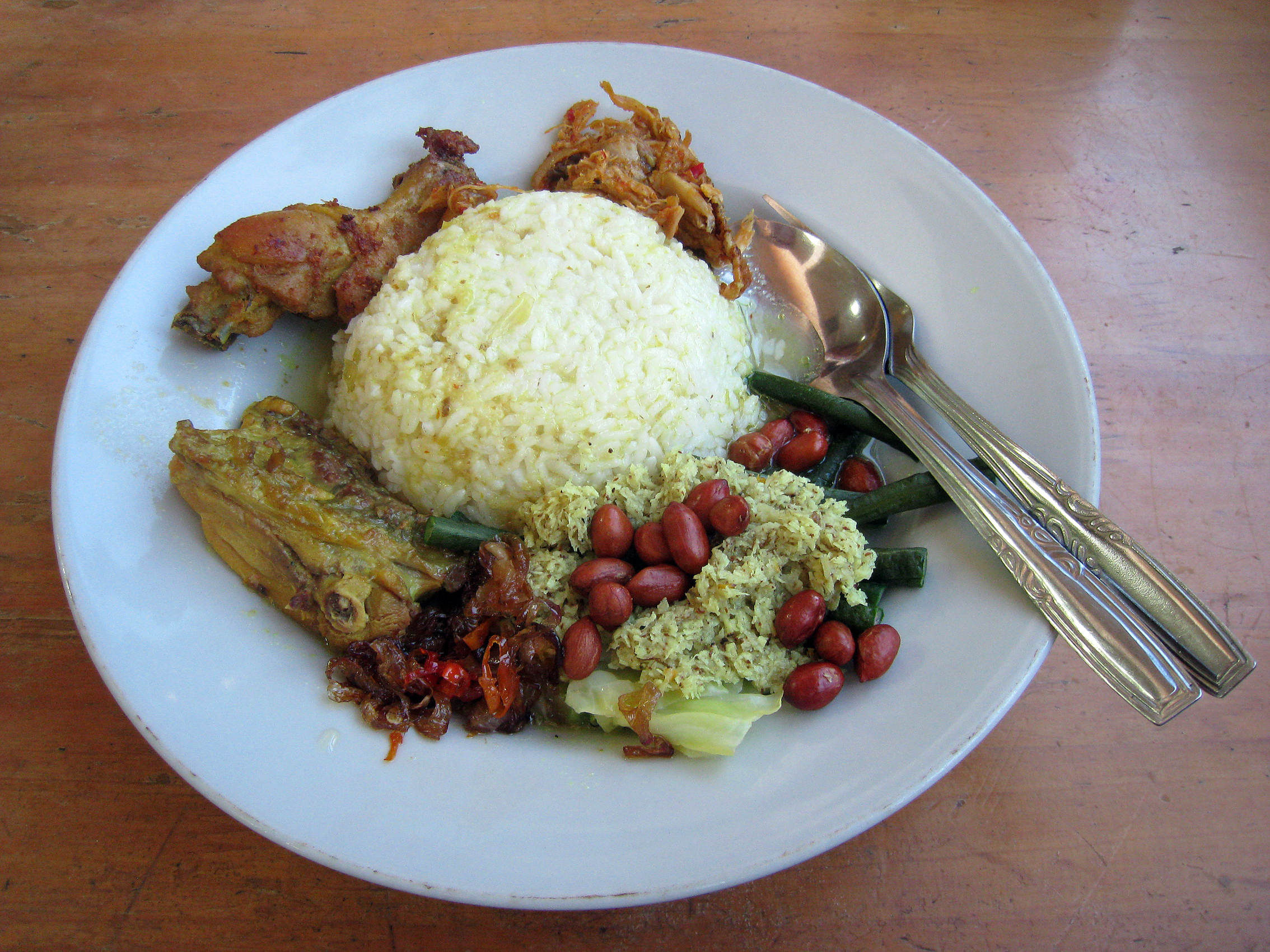
Nasi campur Bali served with ayam betutu and vegetables

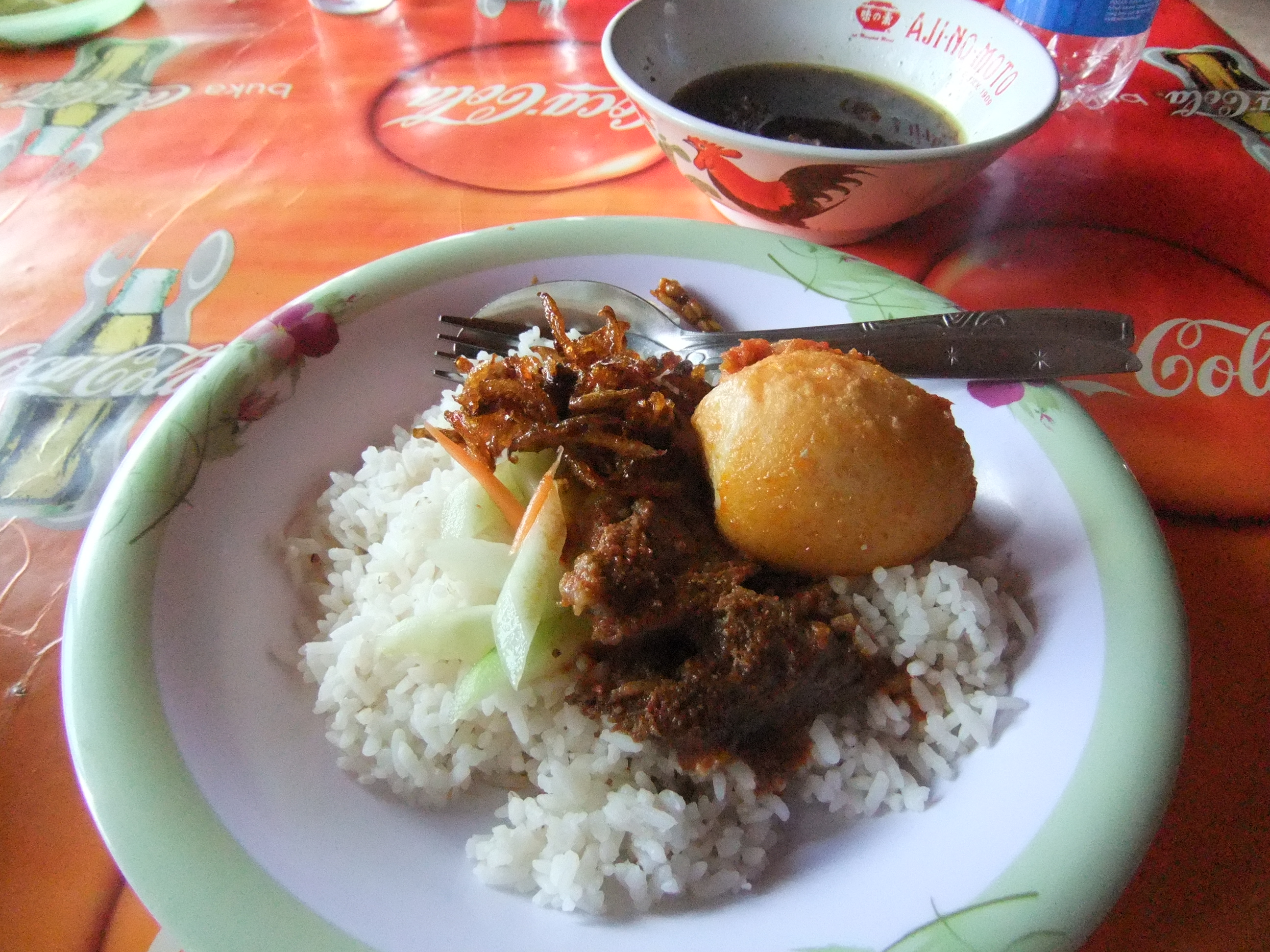
Nasi campur with rawon from Surabaya

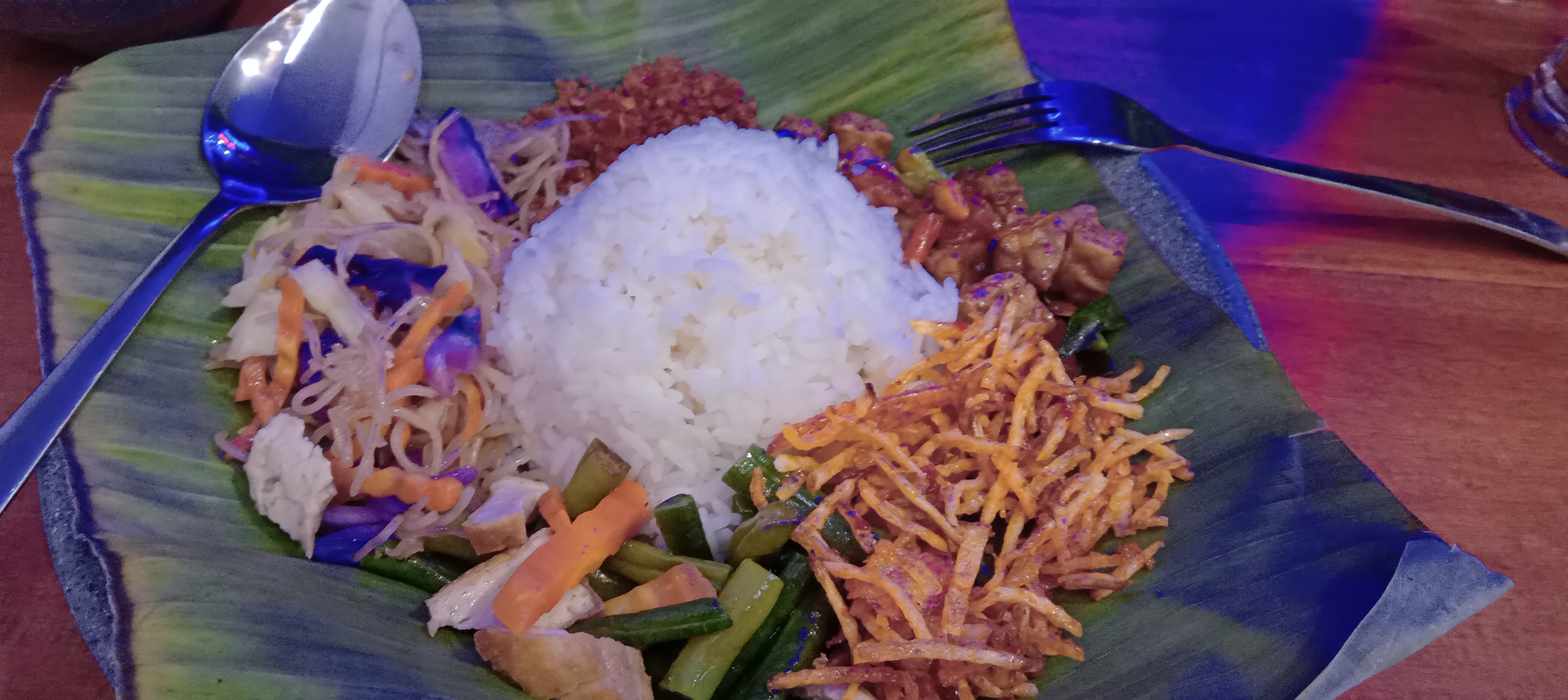
Vegetarian style nasi campur, served in Duta Mas, West Jakarta

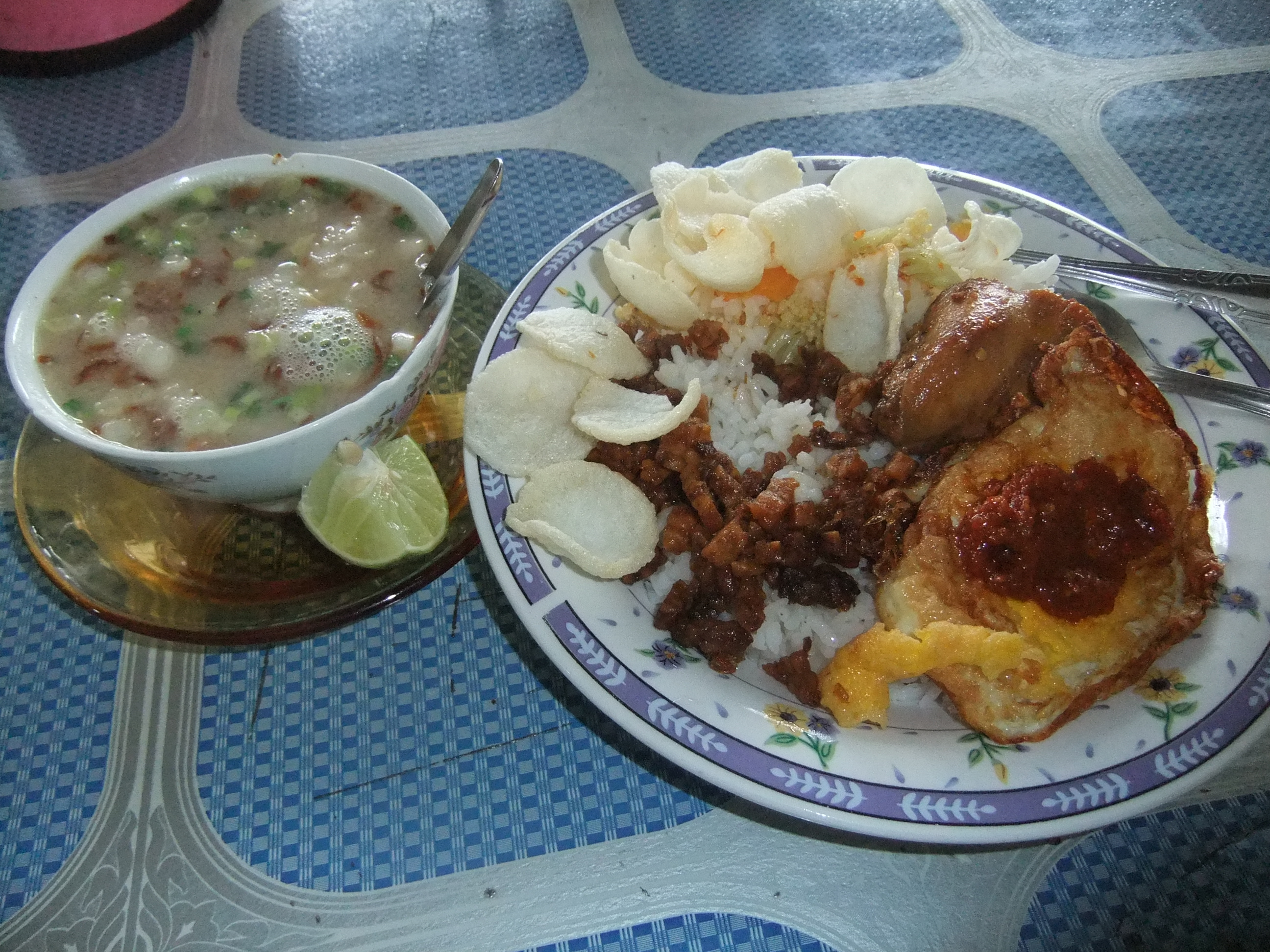
Nasi campur served in Jeneponto, South Sulawesi

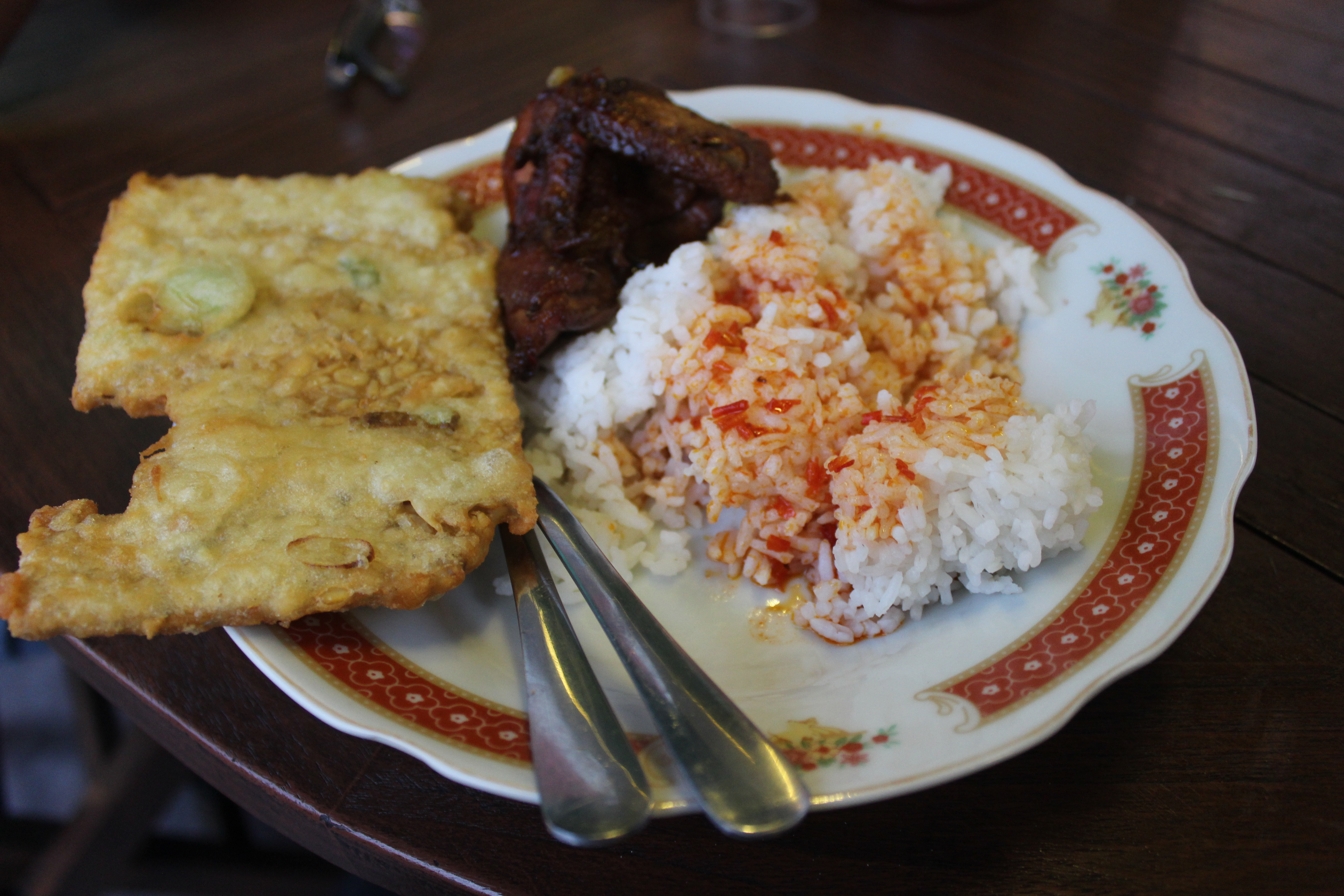
Javanese nasi campur with honey chicken and tempeh

Balinese Nasi Campur: non-veg (top) and vegetarian (bottom)

== See also ==
- List of rice dishes
- List of steamed foods
- Bibimbap
- Chanpurū
- Economy rice
- Donburi
- Gaifan
- Nasi kapau
- Nasi kandar
- Nasi bogana
- Nasi goreng
- Nasi kucing
- Nasi kuning
- Nasi lemak
- Nasi pecel
- Nasi uduk
- Nasi ulam
- Rijsttafel
