= Economy rice =

Rice with dishes of the customer's choice

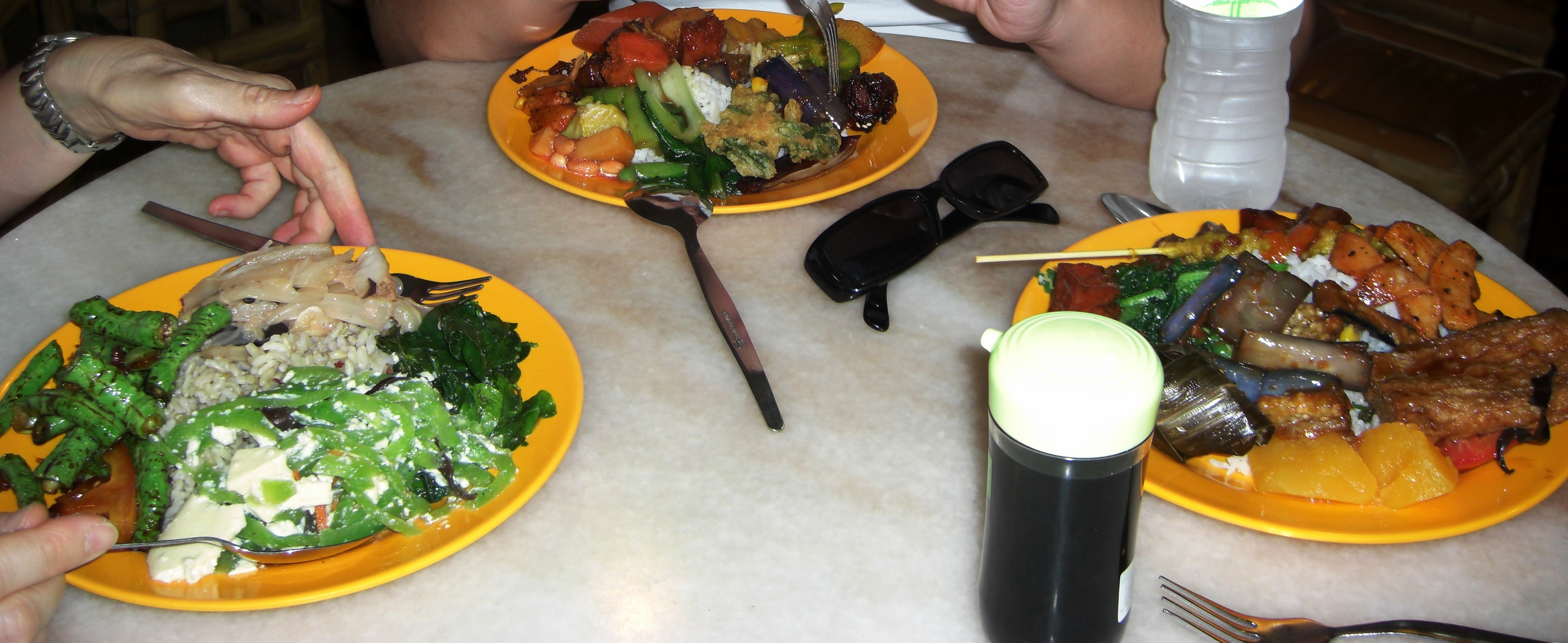
- Three plates of economy rice
- Alternative names: Mixed rice, jaahp faahn, tsa̍p-tshài-pn̄g, keng-tsè-puīnn, pick-pick rice, zhap fan
- Region or state: Malaysia, Singapore and Indonesia
- Serving temperature: Hot or warm

Economy rice or economic rice (simplified Chinese: 经济饭; traditional Chinese: 經濟飯; pinyin: jīngjì fàn; Jyutping: ging1 zai3 faan6; Pe̍h-ōe-jī: keng-chè-pn̄g) is a type of food or food stall serving many dishes accompanied by rice, commonly found in hawker centres, street vendors or food courts in Malaysia, Singapore and Indonesia. Specifically in Singapore, it is commonly known as cai png, from the Hokkien 菜饭; cài fàn; chhài-pn̄g. As a response to the COVID-19 restrictions and the associated economic effect, this concept has become popular in Hong Kong.

Economy rice stalls typically consist of a case containing anywhere from 10 to 15 troughs of cooked dishes, including meat, seafood, vegetables, eggs and tofu. Customers select any combination of these dishes, which are served accompanied by a portion of steamed white rice. Customers also have the option of a serving of curry or gravy to be served atop the steamed rice. In Singapore, it is more common to find the food in open troughs kept warm by hot water and an electric heater below.

== Origins ==
Economy rice is thought of as a predominantly Chinese food; it is roughly analogous to the Malay or Indonesian concept of nasi padang or nasi campur (mixed rice). It is what most Chinese Malaysians and Singaporeans think of when they refer to "home-cooked" food, as it is similar to what would be eaten at home, with rice forming the basis of the meal, accompanied by various cooked dishes. Thus, there is no specific origin for the dish; instead it blends dishes and ingredients from the region they are cooked in.

Economy rice stalls thus evolved as a way for the general public to obtain a quick, and most importantly, cheap meal option outside of home. An economy rice meal is usually one of the cheapest options available for a meal at a hawker centre (hence its name), especially if one is judicious in choosing the less expensive dishes (generally vegetables and tofu). Economy rice stalls are common features of hawker centres or kopitiams.

== Common dishes ==
A plate of economy rice comprising brown rice and meat and vegetable dishes, such as potato, sausage, lady's finger and ikan bilis, with chilli sauce on the side

Common dishes offered at an economy rice stall can include sweet and sour pork, braised tofu, braised cabbage, steamed egg custard, stir-fried Chinese vegetables, fried eggs, and an assortment of deep-fried items.

True to its Chinese origins, most of the dishes on offer tend to have their roots in Chinese cuisine.

== Other names ==
Economy rice is known by several other names, and in general conversation it is rare for anyone to refer to it as such, even though many stalls tend to proclaim "Economy rice" on their signboards.

Other names for economy rice include jaahp faahn (Chinese: 雜飯; pinyin: zá fàn; lit. 'mixed rice') in Cantonese or tsa̍p-tshài-pn̄g (Chinese: 雜菜飯; pinyin: zá cài fàn; lit. 'mixed dishes (with) rice') in Hokkien and, colloquially, "point-point rice", named for the method of ordering one's meal which involves simply asking for a plate of rice and then pointing at the various dishes desired (and commonly saying in Chinese: "zhè gè" (这个, "this") or "nà gè" (那个, "that") due to some customers not knowing the Chinese names of the dishes.

== Similar cultures ==
=== Malay-Indonesian ===
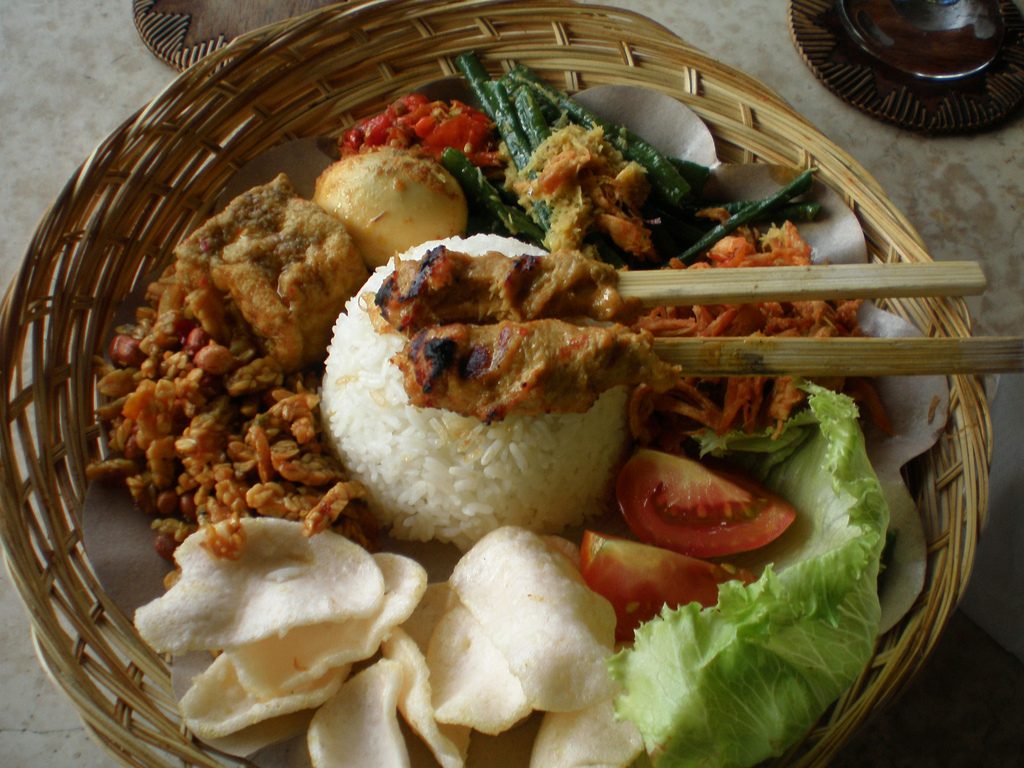
A Balinese-styled nasi campur

Nasi campur, popular in Brunei, Indonesia, Malaysia and Singapore, is a mixed rice dish that shares similarities with economy rice. This dish represents the Malay and Indonesian interpretation of the concept. While economy rice typically features an array of Chinese-inspired dishes, such as stir-fried vegetables and braised meats, reflecting its Chinese culinary heritage, nasi campur emphasizes stronger Indonesian and Malay flavors, incorporating spices, sambal and distinct regional dishes like rendang and fried tempeh.

People oftentimes confuse this with nasi padang, a rice dish and culinary tradition of Indonesian (specifically Minangkabau) origin. However, nasi padang involves more dishes centred upon rich curry, with coconut milk being a major ingredient in the latter.

The Indian Muslim community in Malaysia also has a similar concept called nasi kandar, usually comprising rice and a variety of Indian-style curries.

=== Thailand ===
Khao gaeng (Thai: ข้าวแกง) is a popular Thai meal of rice served with a variety of pre-cooked dishes, including spicy curries, stir-fried meats, and vegetables, offering a broad selection that showcases Thai flavors and cooking styles. Known for its convenience and affordability, khao gaeng can be found in bustling markets, food courts and street-side vendors across Thailand, catering to busy urban dwellers seeking quick, hearty meals. Establishments, known as raan khao gaeng (Thai: ร้านข้าวแกง), typically display an assortment of dishes in large trays, allowing customers to easily select portions for takeaway or dine-in. This traditional dining option has evolved with Thai society, becoming a daily staple for many due to its adaptability, rich flavors, and connection to Thai culinary heritage.

=== Hong Kong ===
In Hong Kong, there is a kind of similar dish known as "two-dish rice" (Chinese: 兩餸飯; Jyutping: loeng5 sung3 faan6), and its name may vary with the number of dishes included in a set. Some people also humorously call this kind of dish as “this this rice”, referring to customers selecting which toppings they'd like. Due to its low price, "two-dish rice" gained increased popularity, particularly among the grassroot citizens of Hong Kong during the economic recession brought by the COVID-19 pandemic. Before the pandemic, this kind of dish had also been already popular in university and staff canteens.

=== Hawaii ===
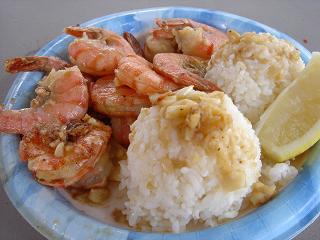
Hawaiian plate lunch

Plate lunch (Hawaiian: pā mea ʻai) is a signature Hawaiian meal that reflects a blend of Polynesian, North American and East Asian cuisines. Typically consisting of one or two scoops of white rice, macaroni salad, and an entrée—often Japanese-inspired like chicken katsu or teriyaki—this meal has its roots in the 1880s, evolving from the Japanese bento tradition to cater to plantation workers in Hawaii. Over time, it has expanded to include a variety of popular entrées, such as kalbi, char siu pork, and kālua puaʻa, showcasing the diverse culinary influences on the islands. As plate lunches gained popularity, they transitioned from lunch wagons to standalone restaurants, eventually making their way to the U.S. mainland, where they continue to attract fans of Hawaiian cuisine.

=== Vietnam ===
Cơm bình dân, or cơm bụi, is a Vietnamese term that refers to an affordable meal primarily featuring rice accompanied by a variety of side dishes typical of Vietnamese cuisine. Literally translating to "commoner's rice," this dish is commonly sold by street vendors and restaurants. A typical cơm bình dân meal consists of a generous serving of rice, often paired with boiled or pickled vegetables, a light soup, and a selection of meats, which may include pork, beef, chicken, fish, or tofu, alongside grains and additional vegetables.

== See also ==
- Bar mleczny
