= Carinderia =

Eatery in the Philippines

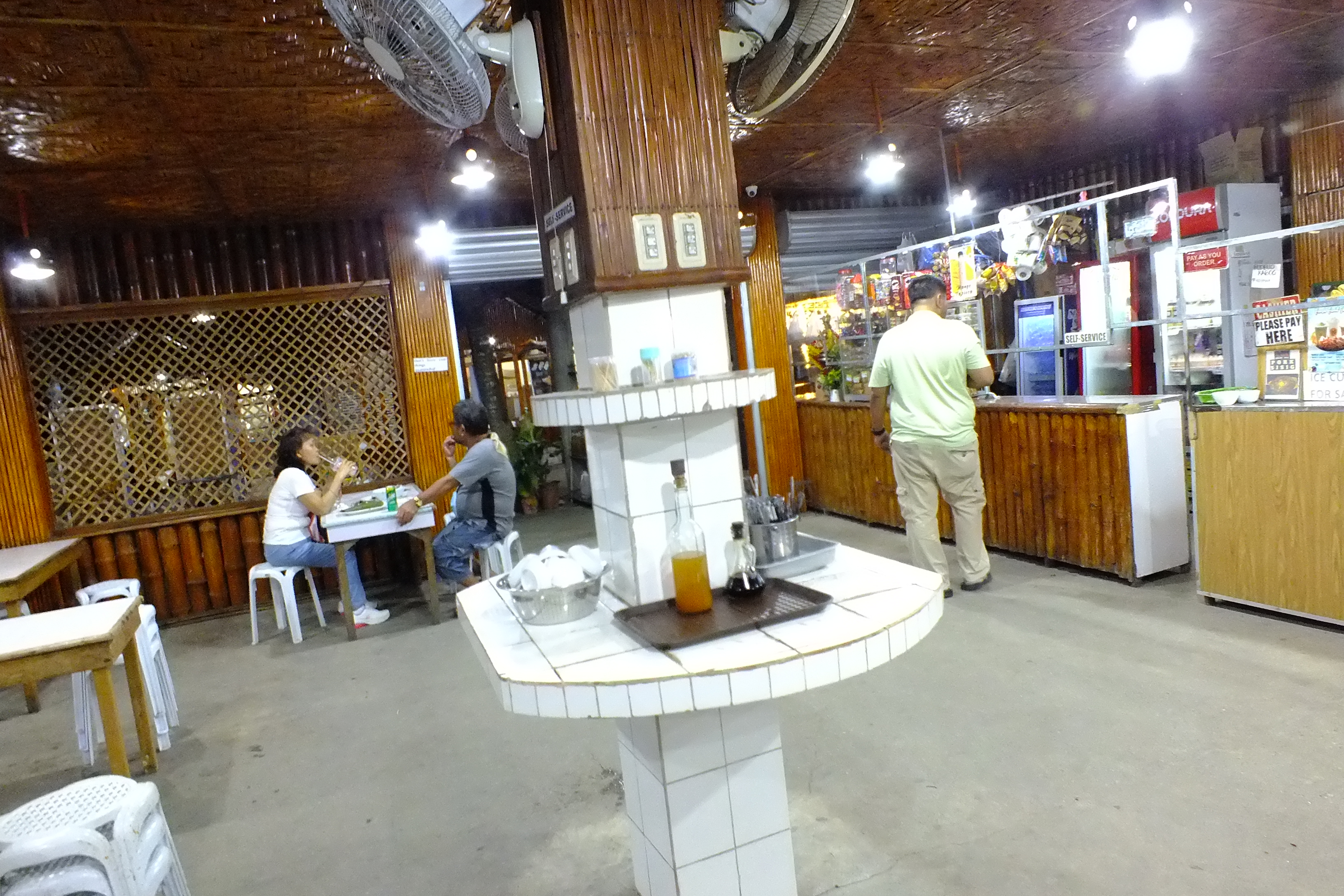
Common setup of a Filipino carinderia

A carinderia (sometimes spelled as karinderya) is a type of eatery in the Philippines that serves affordable and locally-inspired dishes. These food establishments, also known as turo-turo (meaning "point-point" in Filipino), play a significant role in Filipino cuisine and provide a convenient and economical dining option for a broad demographic.

== History and evolution ==
The concept of the carinderia can be traced back to the early 1800s when it emerged as a native food shop and a convenient stop for travelers. Prior to 1764, there was no specific Filipino term to describe a commercial establishment selling cooked food. However, with the growth of busy crossroads, carinderias developed into a quick food service option for locals and travelers in need of sustenance. Over time, carinderias have adapted and evolved to meet the needs and preferences of Filipinos. Today, variations of carinderias can be found, including traveling carinderias and high-class carinderias, each offering its own unique dining experience and menu options.

=== Influence of British Sepoys ===
According to Filipino food historian Felice Prudente-Sta. Maria, carinderias and "karihans" (a term used interchangeably with carinderias) in the Philippines were influenced by the presence of British Sepoys. British Sepoys were Indian natives who deserted British General William Draper's fleet around 1764 during the British occupation of Manila. These Sepoys integrated into the local community, marrying Filipina wives and settling in towns in the province of Tondo such as Taytay and Cainta, which were located along the Maytime Pilgrimage route to Antipolo Church.

=== Role in pilgrimage routes and tourism ===
Carinderias played a crucial role in providing sustenance to travelers and pilgrims along pilgrimage routes. As tourist transportation options emerged, such as the inauguration of the Philippine railway in 1892, towns like Cainta and Taytay became important stops for pilgrims embarking on the trek to the Antipolo town shrine. These towns witnessed an increase in the number of carinderias, offering a diverse menu that often included dishes like curry. The term "carinderia" has been linked by Spanish authority Wenceslao E. Retana to the Tagalog word for curry, "kari," which is also the root word for the native dish called Kare-kare.

== Cuisine ==
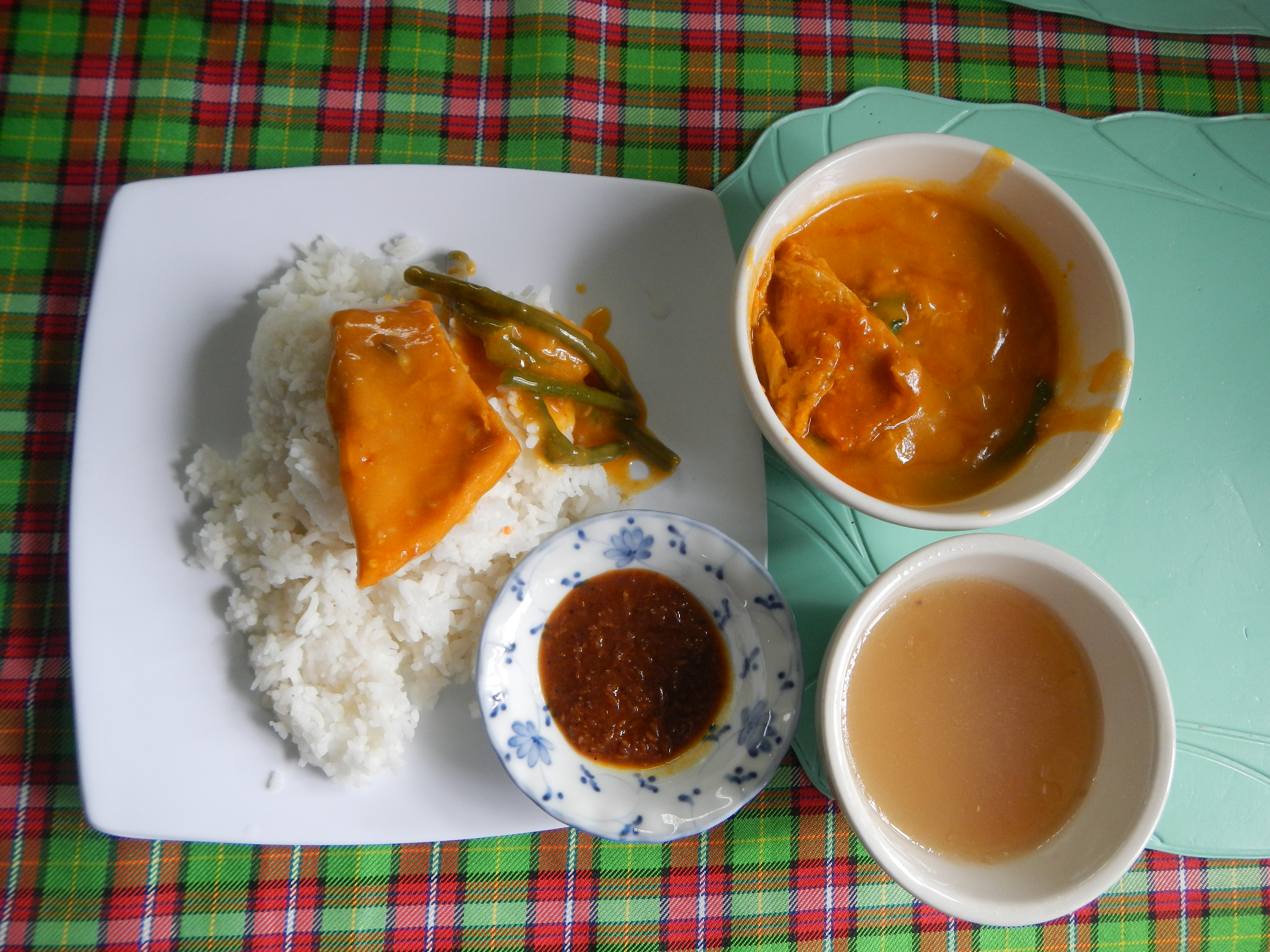
Typical carinderia meal

Carinderias offer a wide range of Filipino dishes, including traditional home-cooked meals and popular local favorites. The menu can vary from day to day, depending on the availability of ingredients and the cook's expertise. Common offerings may include adobo (marinated meat stew), sinigang (sour soup), tinola (chicken stew), kare-kare (oxtail stew in peanut sauce), and a variety of vegetable and seafood dishes. Rice, the staple food of Filipinos, is usually included or available as a side dish.

Some carinderias display raw meats, such as chicken neck, chicken livers, chicken gizzards, strips of marinated pork or chicken meat, pork belly or other foods which are typically basted in some type of sauce and skewered on bamboo sticks for grilling.

== See also ==
- Cha chaan teng
- Khao kaeng
- Kopitiam
- Mamak stall
- Nasi campur
