= Nasi padang =

Indonesian rice dish

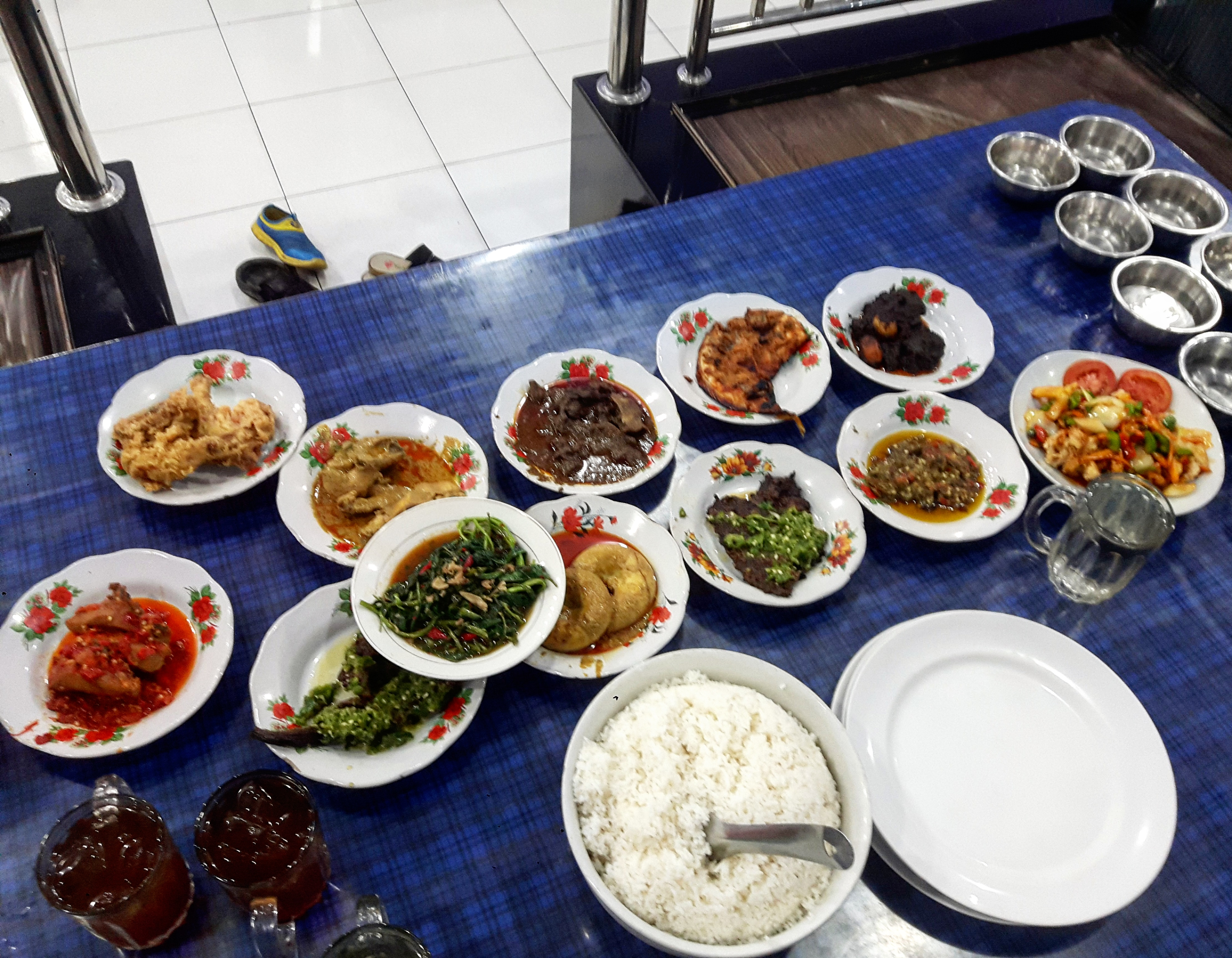
- Nasi padang
- Type: Rice dish
- Course: Main course
- Place of origin: Indonesia
- Region or state: West Sumatra
- Serving temperature: hot or room temperature
- Similar dishes: Nasi kapau, nasi campur

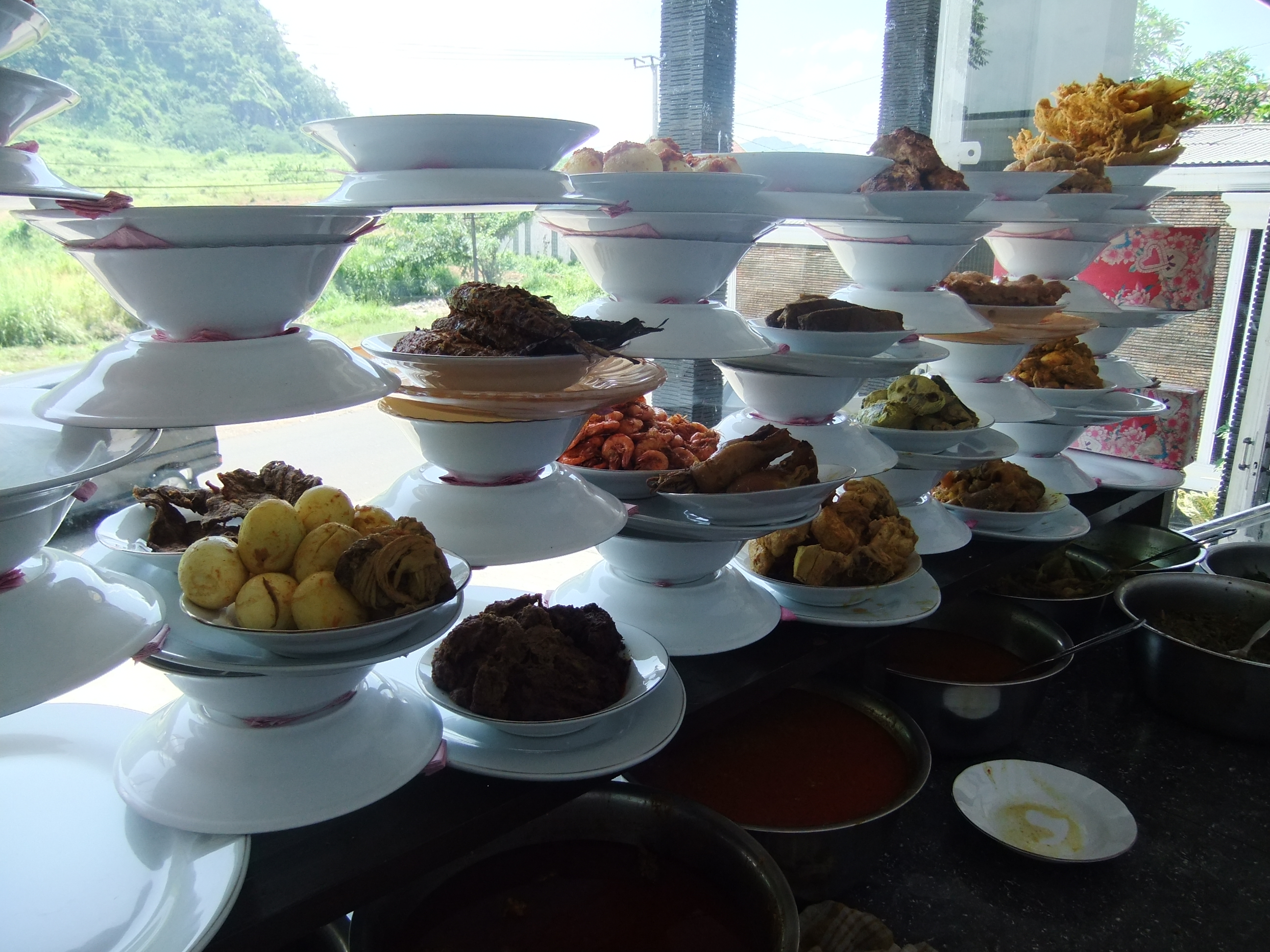
The array of the dishes in a nasi padang window display in a Padang restaurant

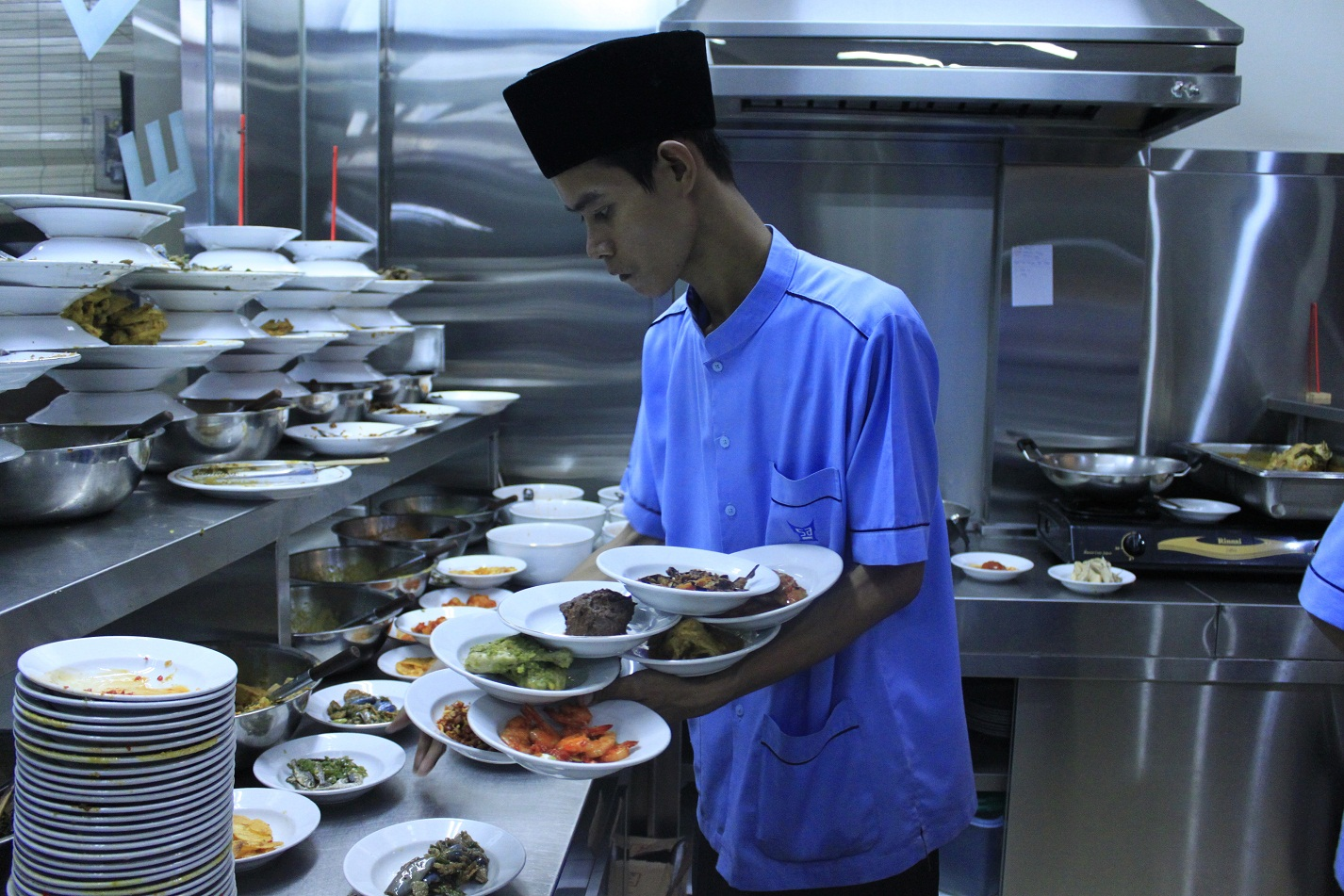
The waiter stacking plates of dishes in his hand prior to hidang serve in a Padang restaurant

Nasi padang, sometimes referred to as Padang rice, is a Minangkabau dish of steamed rice served with various choices of pre-cooked dishes originating from West Sumatra, Indonesia. It is named after the city of Padang, the capital of the West Sumatra province. A miniature banquet of meats, fish, vegetables, and spicy sambals eaten with plain white rice, it is Sumatra's most famous export and the Minangkabau people's primary contribution to Indonesian cuisine.

A Padang restaurant is usually easily distinguishable with its Rumah Gadang-style facade and typical window display. Usually, such displays consist of stages and rows of carefully arranged, stacked bowls and plates filled with various dishes. Padang restaurants, especially smaller ones, usually bear names in the Minang language.

Nasi padang is a vital part of the Indonesian workers' lunch break in urban areas. When nasi padang prices in the Greater Jakarta area were raised in 2016, municipal civil servants demanded the uang lauk pauk (food allowance, a component of civil servants' salary) to be raised as well.

Nasi padang is found in various cities in Sumatra, Java, Kalimantan, Sulawesi, Nusa Tenggara, and Papua as well as neighboring countries Malaysia, Singapore, East Timor and Australia.

== Serving ==
In Padang restaurants, there are two methods of serving: pesan (ordering) and hidang (serve) methods.

Pesan, the most common method, usually employed by small restaurants with one or two customers ordering at a time, involves the customer examining the window display and choosing each desired dish, ordering directly from the attendant.

In larger restaurants, the festive hidang method is usually employed. This mini banquet is most suitable for dining in a group. After being seated, patrons are served (without prompt) a set of dishes by waiters whose arms are stacked with plates. The dishes, usually numbering a dozen, typically includes beef rendang, curried fish, stewed greens, chili eggplant, curried beef liver, tripe, intestines or foot tendons, fried beef lung, fried chicken, and sambal, the spicy sauces ubiquitous at Indonesian tables.

Nasi padang served this way is akin to an at-your-table, by-the-plate buffet. Customers only pay for what they have consumed from this array.

In Minang food establishments, it is common to eat with one's hands. Kobokan, a bowl of tap water with a slice of lime, is provided for washing hands before and after eating. If a customer does not wish to eat with bare hands, it is acceptable to ask for a spoon and fork.

== Dishes ==
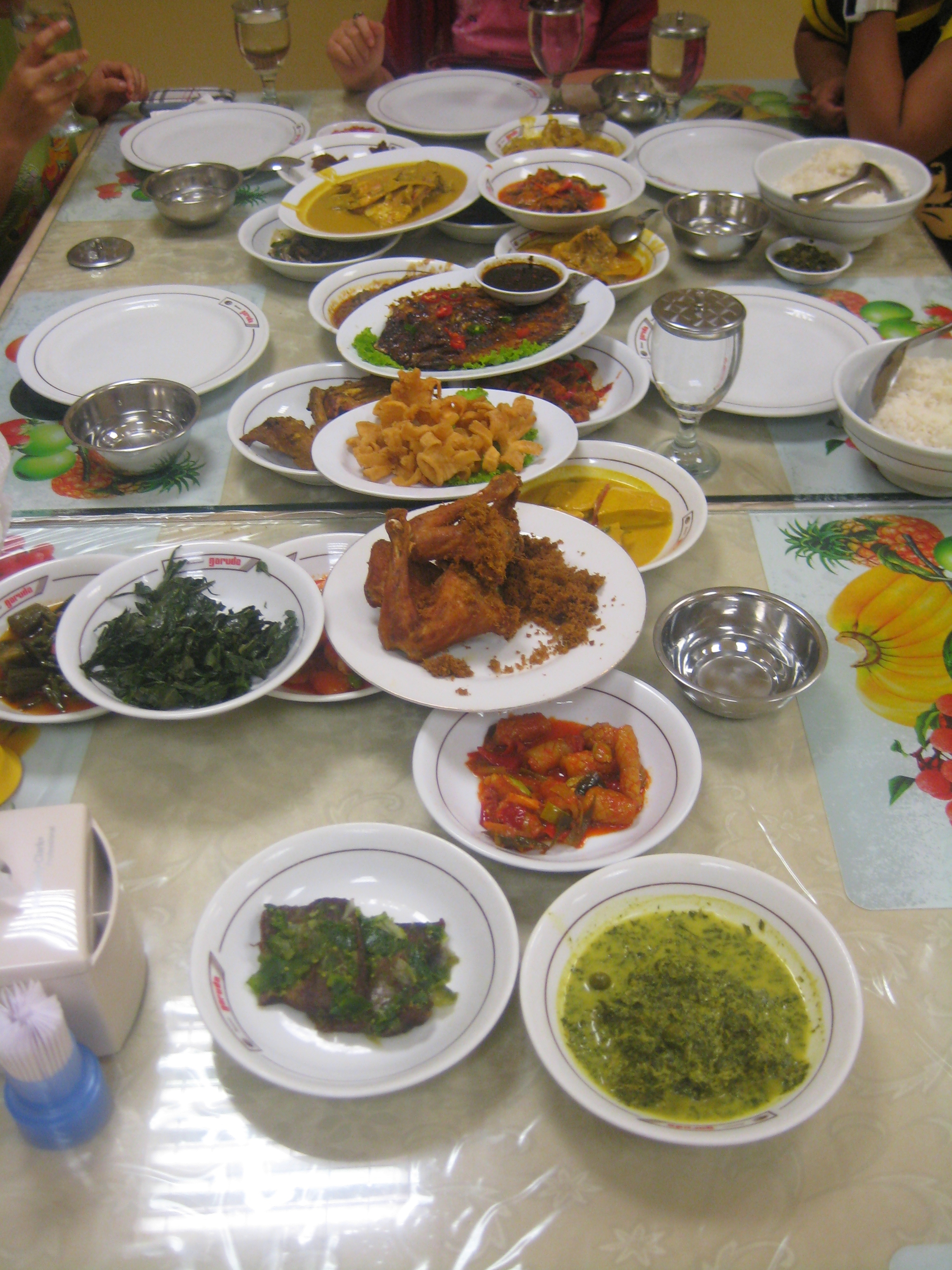
The hidang style of serving in a Padang restaurant

Steamed rice is usually served with gulai cubadak (unripe jackfruit gulai) and boiled cassava leaves. Nasi padang dishes are quite similar to nasi kapau from Bukittinggi. The differences mainly lie in the method of serving. Dishes offered include:

- Gulai cubadak, unripe jackfruit gulai
- Sayur daun ubi kayu or sayur daun singkong, boiled cassava leaves
- Rendang, chunks of beef stewed in spicy coconut milk and chili gravy, cooked well until dried. Other than beef, rendang ayam (chicken rendang) and rendang itik (duck rendang) can be found
- Daun ubi tumbuk, cassava leaves in coconut milk
- Kalio, similar to rendang; while rendang is rather dry, kalio is watery and light-colored
- Gulai ayam, chicken gulai
- Gulai cancang, gulai of meats and cow internal organs
- Gulai tunjang, gulai of cow foot tendons
- Gulai babek, gulai babat or gulai paruik kabau, gulai of cow tripes
- Gulai iso or gulai usus, gulai of cow intestines usually filled with eggs and tofu
- Gulai limpo, gulai of cow spleen
- Gulai ati, gulai of cow liver
- Gulai otak, gulai of cow brain
- Gulai sumsum, gulai of cow bone marrow
- Gulai gajeboh, cow fat gulai
- Gulai itiak, duck gulai
- Gulai talua, boiled eggs gulai
- Gulai kepala ikan kakap merah, red snapper's head gulai
- Gulai jariang, jengkol stinky bean gulai
- Dendeng batokok, thin crispy beef
- Dendeng balado, thin crispy beef with chili
- Paru goreng, fried cow lung
- Ayam bakar, grilled spicy chicken
- Ayam balado, chicken in chili
- Ayam goreng, fried chicken with spicy granules
- Ayam lado ijo, chicken in green chili
- Ayam pop, Minang-style chicken, boiled/steamed and then fried
- Ikan bilih, fried small freshwater fish of the genus Mystacoleucus
- Baluik goreng, crispy fried small freshwater eel
- Udang balado, shrimp in chili
- Rajungan goreng, crispy fried crab
- Terong balado, eggplant in chili
- Petai goreng, fried green stinky bean (Parkia speciosa)
- Ikan asam padeh, fish with spicy-sour taste
- Itiak lado mudo, duck in green chili
- Peyek udang, shrimp rempeyek
- Kerupuk jangek, cow's skin krupuk
- Sambal balado, sambal with large sliced chilli pepper
- Sambal lado tanak, chili/shallot condiment
- Lele goreng, fried catfish

== In popular culture ==
- In 2016, Norwegian singer Audun Kvitland Røstad created an ode for Padang rice to describe his love for this food. The music video subsequently went viral.

== See also ==
- Indonesian cuisine
- List of rice dishes
- Nasi kapau
- Nasi campur
- Nasi uduk
- Nasi ulam
- Padang cuisine
