= Steam minced pork =

Chinese pork dish

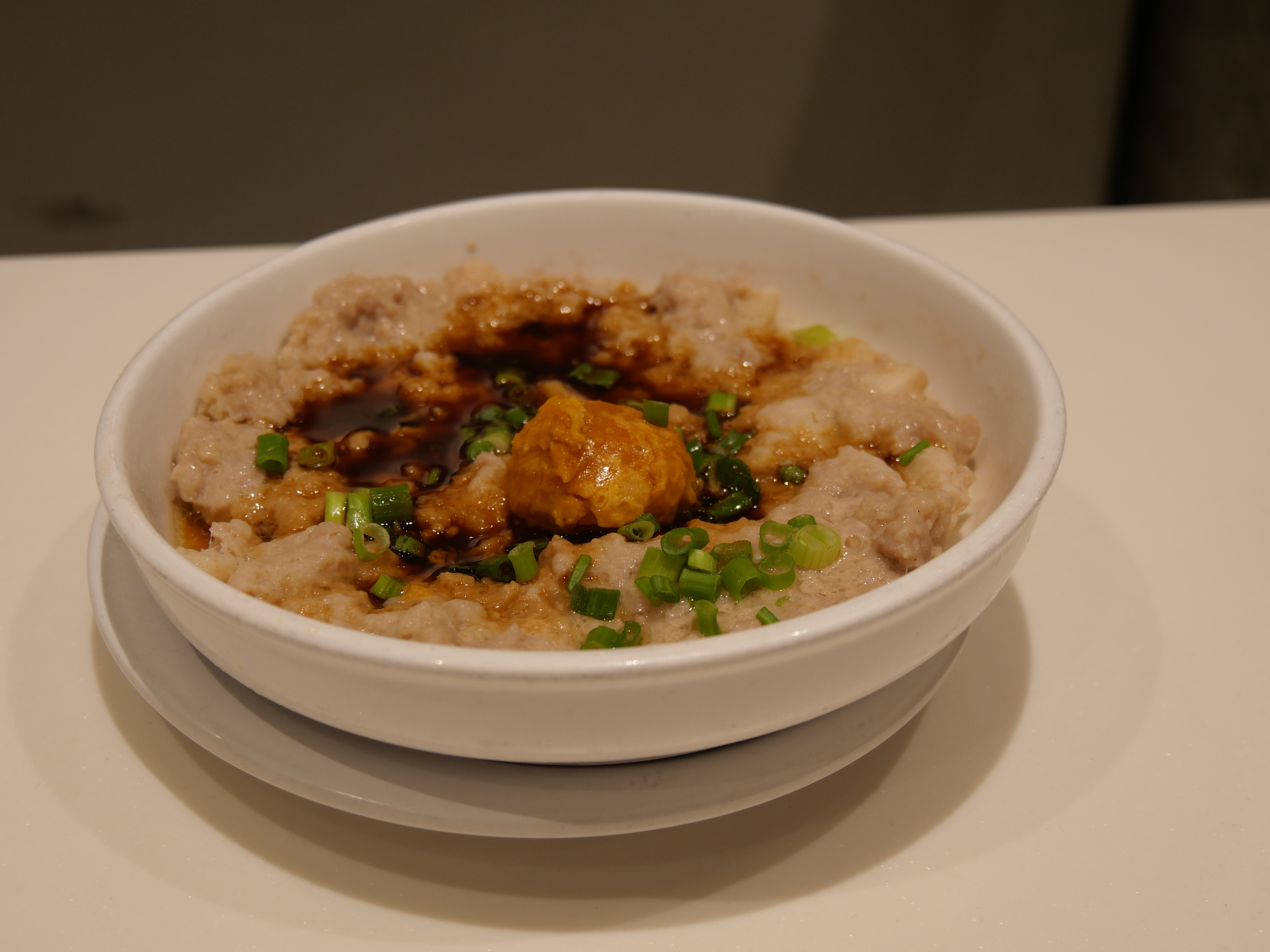
- A kind of Cantonese cuisine, steam minced pork
- Traditional Chinese: 蒸 肉 餅
- Simplified Chinese: 蒸 肉 饼
- Literal meaning: Steamed Pork Cake
Transcriptions
Standard Mandarin
- Hanyu Pinyin: zhēng ròu bǐng
Yue: Cantonese
- Jyutping: zing1 juk6 beng2

Steam minced pork refers to a savory dish popular in Hong Kong and the Guangdong area of China. Consisting mainly of minced pork, it typically includes ingredients such as dried squid (土魷) and preserved cabbage (梅菜). The dish is cooked by steaming over a pot of boiling water until it is well cooked. The seasonings usually include soy sauce, salt, sugar and corn flour and occasionally white pepper and sesame oil. It is usually served with rice during lunch or dinner.

== Culinary history ==
The origin of steam minced pork remains unknown. However, it is believed that it is originated from the Guangdong area of China and is classified as one of the representative Cantonese cuisine dishes. It consists of many typical Guangdong dishes qualities such as a sweet and salty flavour and the steaming method. It is believed to be stemmed from the Hakka (客家) culinary culture. Hakka traditional preserved food such as fermented vegetables like preserved cabbage (梅菜), dried seafood like dried squid (土魷) are common components found in steam minced pork varieties to increase its flavour. As it has widely spread around China, its flavour differentiates in different areas (e.g. less salty and more sweet in the Foshan area) and was mixed with different Southern China crops such as water chestnut and Chinese fermented black beans (豆鼓), dried scallops creating different varieties.

== Characteristic ==
A characteristic of this homemade dish is the rhythmic pounding of the cleaver against the chopping board during preparing the hand-minced pork. Steam minced pork is popular and common among cantonese families because cantonese people find it goes well with rice, and the preparation and ingredients are also simple. For this reason, it is familiar to hear this hand-mincing sound from each home during lunch or dinner time in Hong Kong.

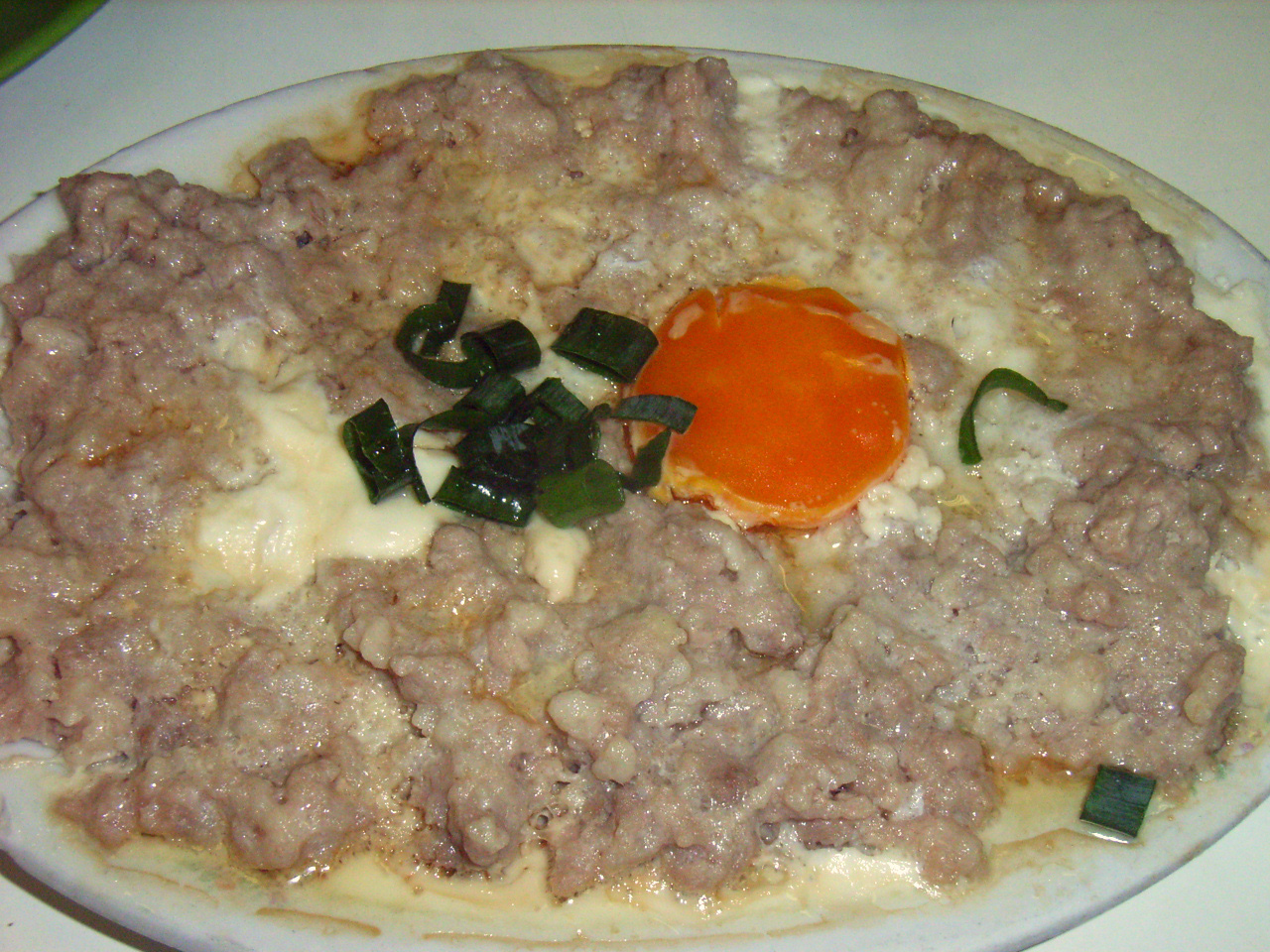
Steamed minced pork with salted egg

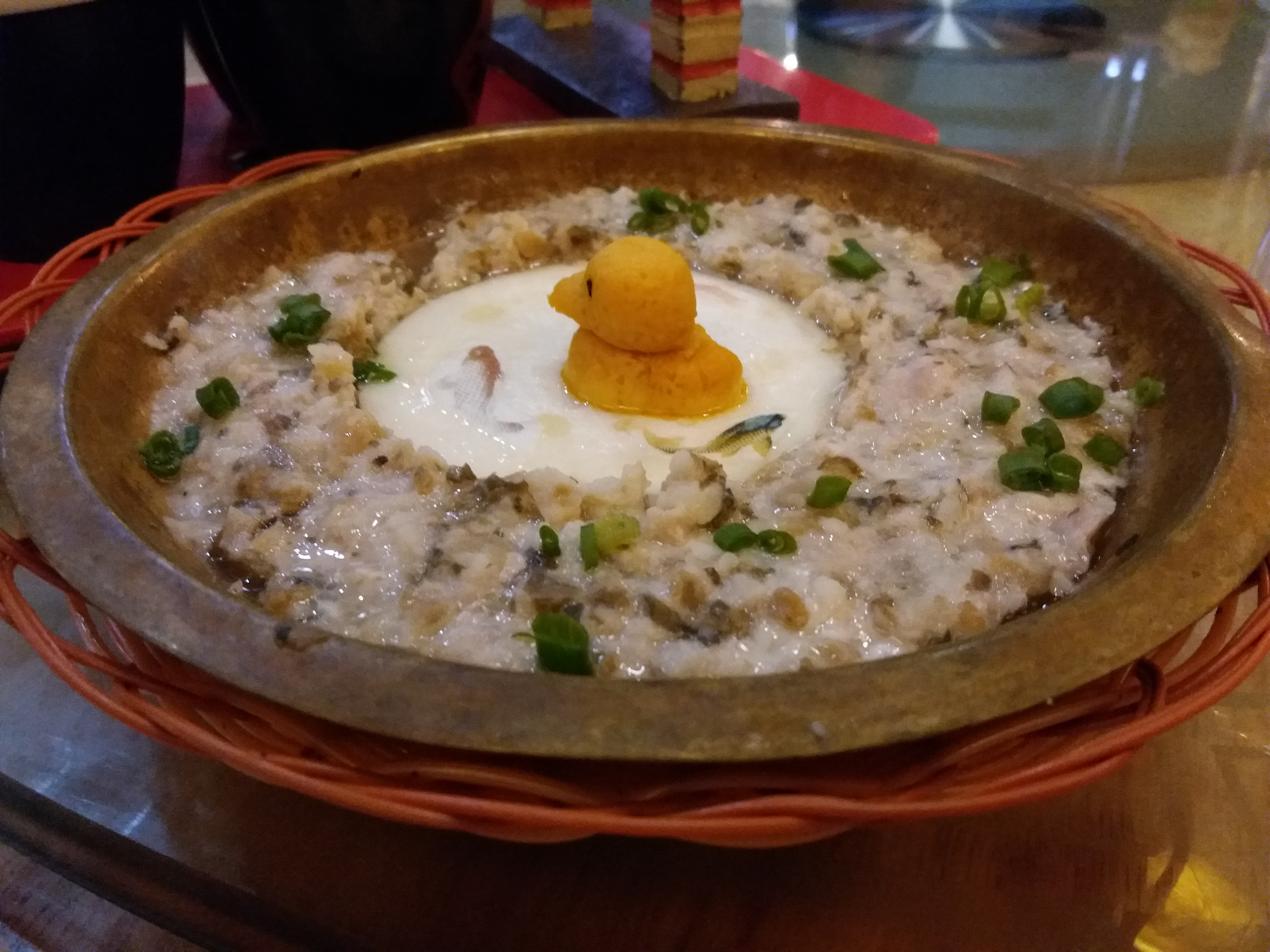
Steamed meat patty with salted egg

== Variation ==
Steam minced pork can be divided into two types. One is a mixture of grind pork with other ingredient, this includes:

- Steam minced pork with shiitake mushrooms and dried scallops (冬菇瑤柱)
- Steam minced pork with dried squid (土魷)
- Steamed minced pork with preserved cabbage (梅菜, “mui4 choi3” in Cantonese)

Another type is steam minced pork with some additions, usually intensely savory and flavorful food placed on the patties, because Cantonese thinks it can "lift" up the pork. Examples are:

- Steamed minced pork with salted fish (鹹魚蒸肉餅)
- Steamed minced pork with salted egg (鹹蛋蒸肉餅)

== Cooking method ==
=== Preparation ===
The preparation usually starts with mincing the pork, traditionally by hand. A technique for yielding a denser and chewier meat texture is lifting the minced pork and thrusting it back into the bowl. The meat typically contains fatback and lean meat in a 1:2 ratio. Fatback is added to keep the moisture of the pork. However, this ratio depends on individual preferences. Seasoning such as soy sauce and other ingredients are added to the minced meat and mixed thoroughly by hand or using chopsticks.

There is no standard recipe: a variety of ingredients can be added for different flavors. Salted fish, Chinese water chestnut, and mushrooms are common additions.

=== Steaming ===
Traditionally, steamed minced pork is cooked by steaming. It is put on top of the steaming stand over a pot of boiling water. However, in Guangdong area, it is also steamed in rice cookers during rice cooking process. The cooking time usually last for 10 to 30 minutes until it is fully cooked.

== Nutritional value ==
Research done by Food and Environmental Hygiene Department (2006) said that steamed minced pork and dried squid with rice contains 210 kilo-calorie, 22 g of carbohydrate, 7.7 g of protein, 9.6 g of total fat, 21 mg of cholesterol, 4 g of sugar and 8.4 mg of calcium, in each 100 g. It is suggested that the elderly should not eat too much.

For steam minced pork with salted egg, according to SkipThePie.org, salted egg contains 622 calories, 52 g of total fat, 8531 mg sodium, 4 g total carbohydrate, 32 g of protein, 54% of vitamin A, 26% of calcium and 47% of iron. Association for Hong Kong Catering Services Management showed that Chinese dry mushrooms has 247 calories, 61.7 g of carbohydrate, 31.6 g dietary fiber,1.2 g of fat, 20 g of protein and 11.2 mg of sodium.

== See also ==
- Cantonese cuisine
- List of pork dishes
