= Cơm bình dân =

Vietnamese cuisine

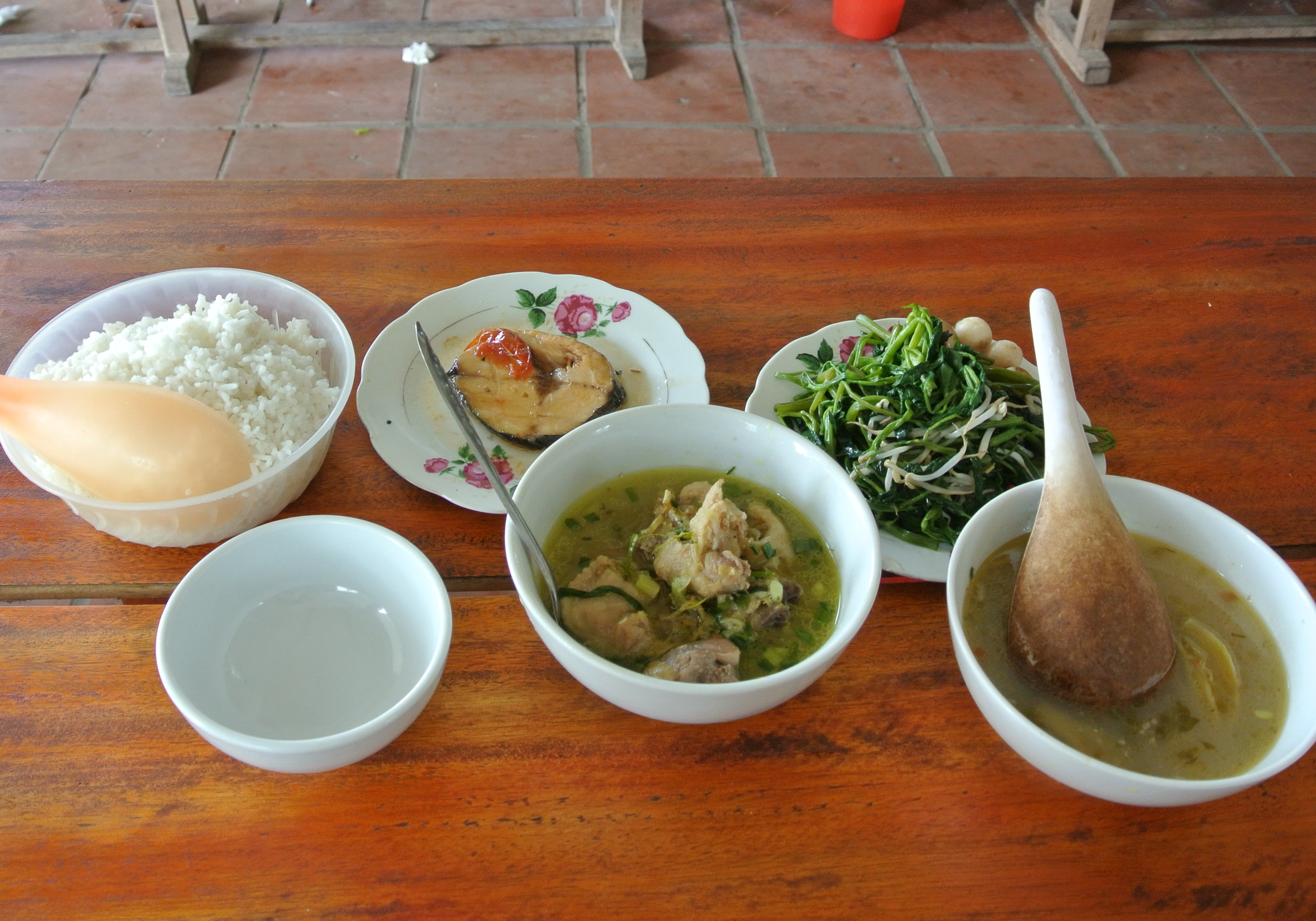
A typical Cơm bình dân meal

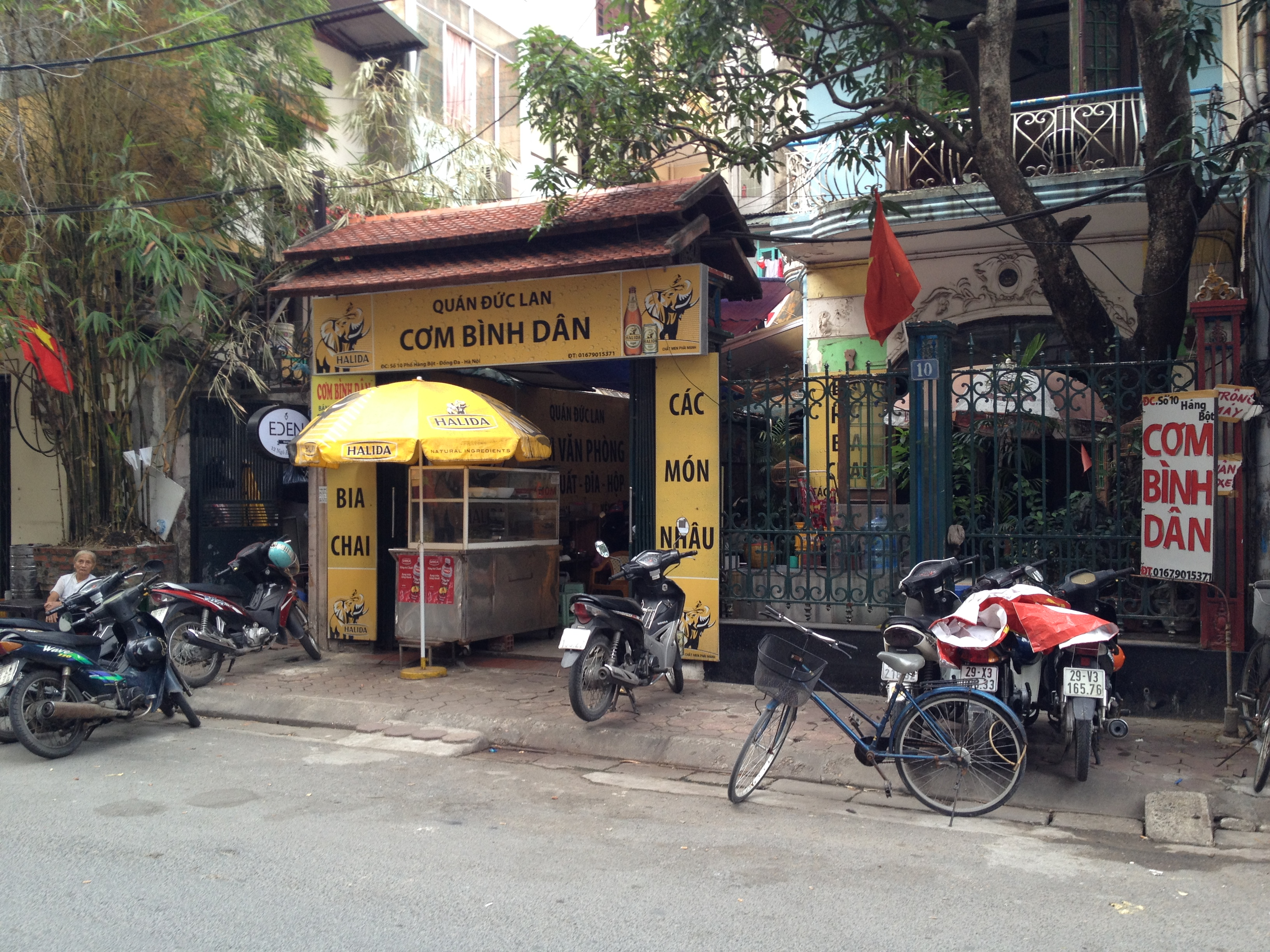
A cơm bình dân restaurant in Vietnam

Cơm bình dân (economic rice) or cơm bụi (dusty rice) is a Vietnamese term that usually refers to an inexpensive meal consisting of rice and a selection of side dishes typical in Vietnamese cuisine sold by street vendors or restaurants but not strictly necessarily as they can also sell other rice dishes. The term literally means "commoner's rice" in Vietnamese.

The meal almost always consists of a large helping of rice, boiled or pickle vegetables, soup, and some choices of meat. Possible side dishes may include pork, beef, chicken, eggs, fish, grains, vegetables, tofu, soups, broths, etc. It is often eaten with chopsticks and a spoon. As the name suggests, cơm bình dân is typically inexpensive, making it affordable for the common Vietnamese.

== See also ==
- Economy rice, a similar inexpensive rice-based meal
- Khao kaeng, a similar concept in Thai cuisine.
