= Khao kaeng =

Thai rice dish

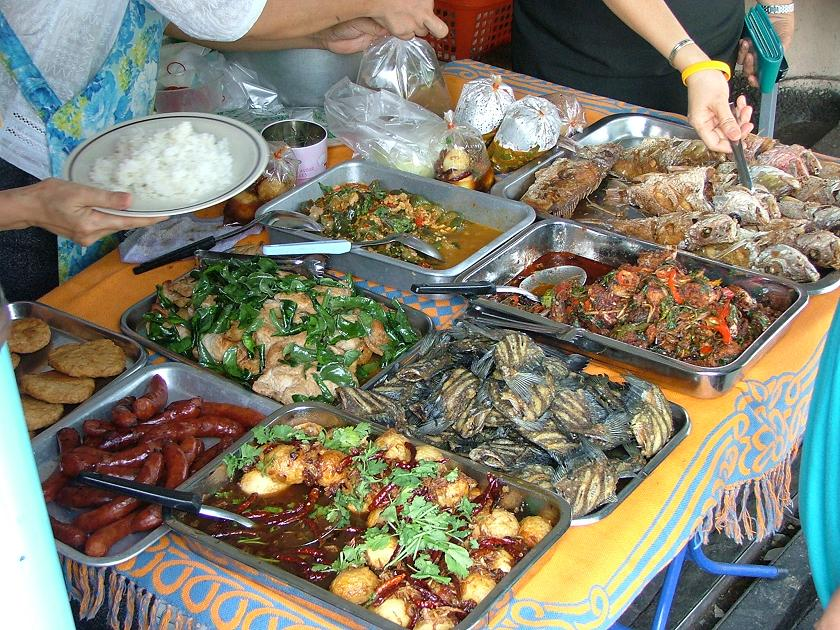
- A typical khao kaeng restaurant setting, displaying a variety of curries and side dishes served with steamed rice.
- Alternative names: Khao gaeng Thai rice and curry khao rat kaeng
- Course: Main course
- Place of origin: Thailand
- Region or state: Nationwide (with regional variations)
- Created by: Thai-Chinese; Thai people
- Serving temperature: Hot or room temperature
- Main ingredients: Steamed rice, curry (various types), with side dishes like vegetables, pickled items or eggs

Khao kaeng or Khao gaeng (Thai: ข้าวแกง), literally "rice and curry", also known as khao rat kaeng (Thai: ข้าวราดแกง), meaning "curry on rice", is a traditional Thai dish consisting of steamed rice served with a variety of curries and side dishes. This dish is a staple of Thai cuisine, particularly popular as a quick and flavorful meal and can be found in restaurants, food stalls and markets across Thailand. The dish is typically characterized by its rich and spicy curries, which are often balanced with fried foods and vegetables.

== History and evolution ==
=== Ayutthaya Period (1351–1767) ===
During the Ayutthaya period, markets in the capital city, including the Taat Kaan market near the royal palace, were hubs of both fresh food and prepared meals. Khao kaeng was among the prepared foods sold alongside items such as rice-wrapped meat (Thai: เมี่ยวห่อ), roasted coconut, Chinese-style dishes, boiled bananas, grilled fish, salted crabs and grilled stingrays. Khao kaeng became particularly popular among government officials, highlighting its status as a convenient and flavorful meal option.

=== Rattanakosin Period (1782–1932) ===
During the early Rattanakosin period, particularly in the reigns of Kings Rama I–III (late 18th to early 19th centuries), food trade flourished in both land-based and riverside markets throughout Bangkok. However, most people still preferred to buy fresh ingredients and prepare meals at home. The practice of eating out, especially purchasing prepared meals such as khao kaeng, is believed to have emerged during the reign of King Rama IV, following the signing of the Bowring Treaty in 1855. This period saw significant economic and infrastructural changes, including the construction of the Phadung Krung Kasem Canal and the first roads in the city. These developments encouraged the growth of residential areas along newly established streets, particularly in the Phra Nakhon area, the historical center of Bangkok.

=== King Chulalongkorn and the Term 'Khao Kaeng' ===
The term "khao kaeng" (ข้าวแกง), meaning "rice and curry," is one of the earliest recorded mentions in a letter written by King Chulalongkorn (King Rama V). In the letter, the king expressed dissatisfaction with his meals, specifically the side dishes (กับข้าว), which he found unappetizing. On one occasion, he requested Krom Muen Prab, a royal official, to purchase khao kaeng (curry rice) for him. King Chulalongkorn is said to have developed a particular fondness for khao kaeng, and during his royal tours, arrangements were often made to ensure he could enjoy the dish while traveling.

=== Khao Kaeng Shops in the Late Rattanakosin Period ===
According to the Sarbanya Chi (Public Register), Part 2, which listed residents in the districts and streets of Bangkok in the year 1245 BE (approximately 1883 CE), during the reign of King Rama V, there were 57 khao kaeng shops, 10 noodle shops, 14 fried noodle stalls, 2 rice dumpling shops, 3 shops selling Thai noodles and 6 porridge stalls in Bangkok. By the late reign of King Rama V and the early reign of King Rama VI, khao kaeng street vendors had become common, especially in urban areas.

Lawan Chotamar, a writer, recounts that over a century ago, a well-known khao kaeng stall was run by a couple, Ta Peng and Yai Puk, at the Ban Mo intersection. The stall, located near a large hall called Sala Ta Peng, became highly successful, and the couple amassed wealth from their khao kaeng business.

Additionally, many roadside food vendors, particularly near gambling houses, sold khao kaeng These vendors were often operated by Chinese immigrants from the Teochew community. Phaya Anuman Rajadhon, a Thai scholar and official, recorded that these khao kaeng stalls primarily catered to Chinese laborers, but Thai people also frequented them, sitting on long benches to eat the affordable meals.

=== Modern Day ===
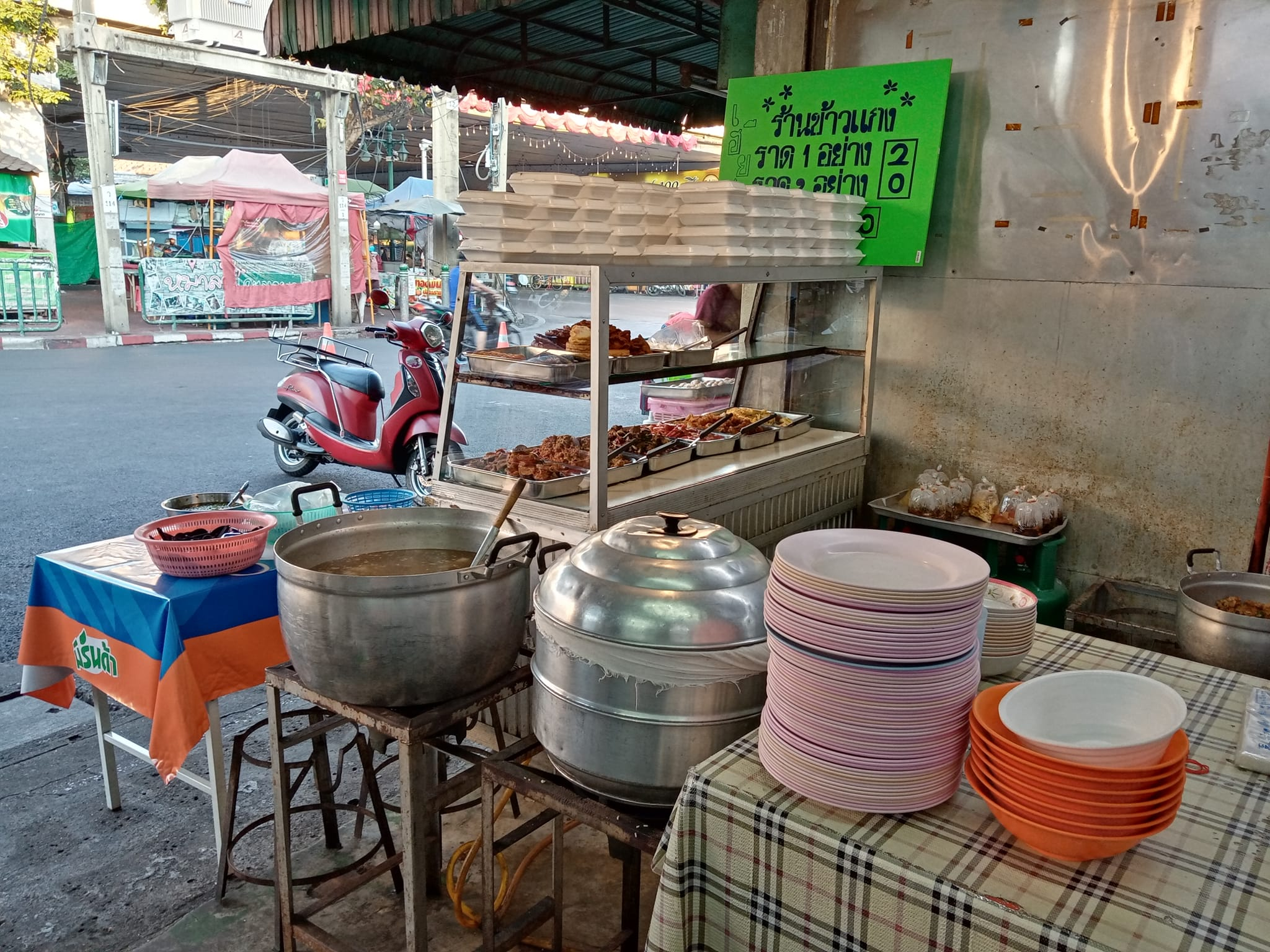
Inside a traditional khao kaeng restaurant in Talat Phlu, Bangkok

Today, khao kaeng remains a popular and accessible meal, available in a variety of settings, including sit-down restaurants, food stalls, and even in gas stations. At these establishments, customers typically choose a portion of steamed rice served with a variety of curries and side dishes according to their preferences. Most khao kaeng shops that offer seating operate in the morning, primarily catering to local communities, while khao kaeng vendors in markets, referred to as "market khao kaeng" (khao kaeng Na Talat) or "takeaway khao kaeng" (Arthan Thung), are popular for dinner.

In Bangkok, one notable regional variety of khao kaeng is khao kaeng pak tai, which features dishes from Southern Thailand, known for their bold flavors and spiciness.

== See also ==
- Thai cuisine
- Thai curry
- Khao Pad (fried rice)
- Khao Soi (northern Thai curry noodle soup)
- Street food of Thailand
- List of Thai dishes
- Nasi Campur
- Carinderia
