= Kue =

Indonesian bite-sized snack or dessert

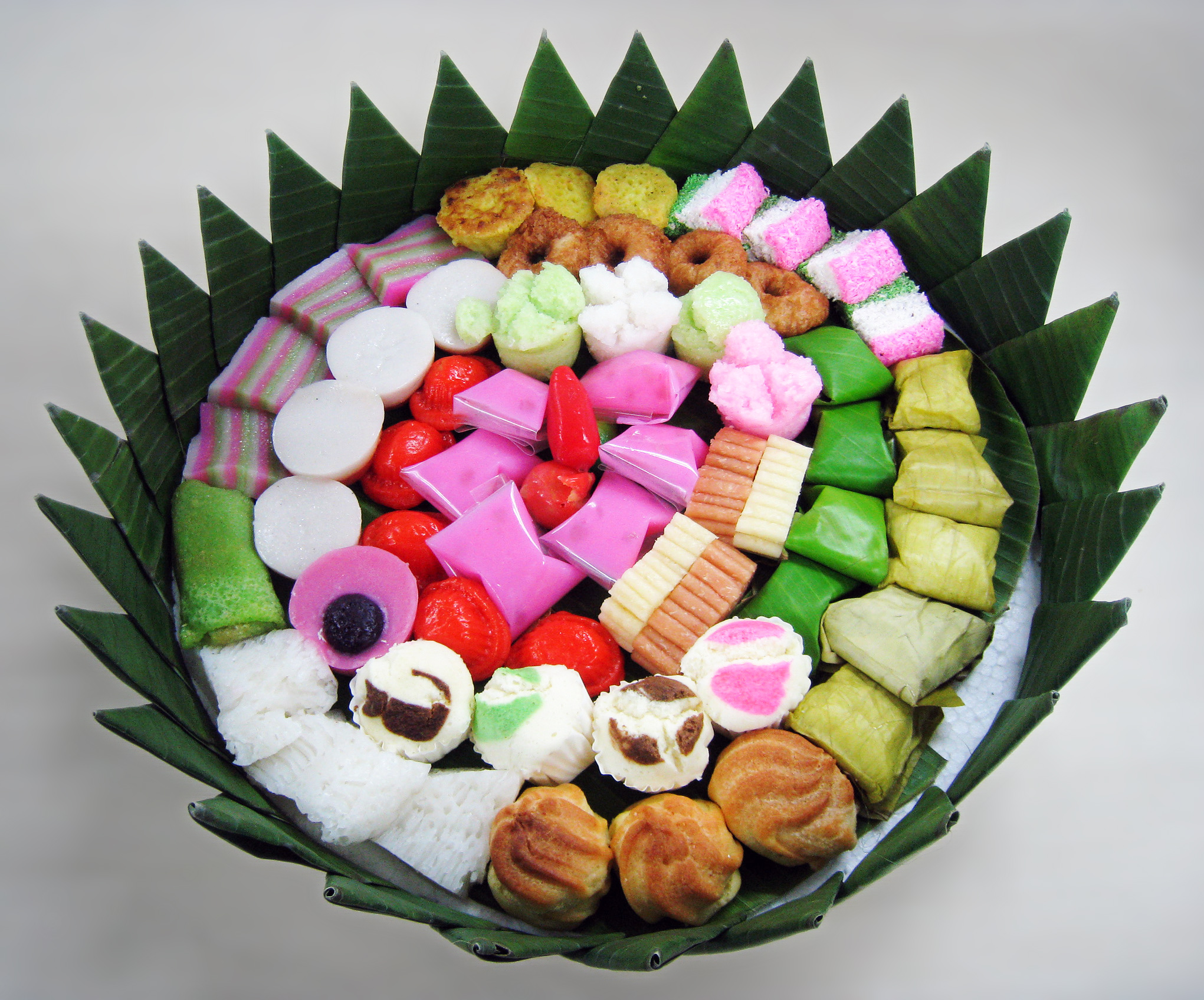
- Jajan pasar (market snacks) in Java, consisting of assorted kue
- Alternative names: Kueh (Hokkian), Kuih (Brunei, Malaysia, Singapore)
- Course: Snack
- Place of origin: Indonesia
- Region or state: Nationwide
- Main ingredients: Various traditional snacks
- Similar dishes: Kuih, Mont, Khanom, Bánh

Kue are bite-sized snacks or desserts originally from what is now Indonesia but have since spread throughout Southeast Asia. Kue is a fairly broad term in Indonesian to describe a wide variety of snacks including cakes, cookies, fritters, pies, scones, and patisserie. Kue are made from a variety of ingredients in various forms; some are steamed, fried or baked. They are popular snacks in Indonesia, which has the largest variety of kue. Because of the countries' historical colonial ties, Koeé (kue) is also popular in the Netherlands.

Indonesian kue demonstrate local native delicacies, Chinese and Indian influences, as well as European cake and pastry influences. For example, wajik, kue bugis, klepon, nagasari, getuk, and lupis are of native origin; while bakpia and kue ku are of Chinese Peranakan origin, kue putu is derived from Indian puttu; on the other hand, lapis legit, kue cubit, kastengel, risoles and pastel are European influenced.

== Etymology ==
The term "kue" is derived from Hokkien: 粿 koé. It is a Chinese loanword in Indonesian. It is also spelled as kuih in Malaysian, and kueh in Singapore. Kue are more often steamed than baked, and are thus very different in texture, flavour and appearance from Western cakes or puff pastries. Many kue are sweet, but some are savoury.

Indonesian kue are usually categorized according to their moisture, roughly divided under two groups, kue basah (lit. 'wet kue') and kue kering (lit. 'dry kue'). However, the word kue in Indonesian language is used to refer to not only these kinds of traditional snacks, but also to all types of cake and some types of pastries. Most kue kering are technically pastries and many Western cakes can be considered as kue basah.

== History and influences ==
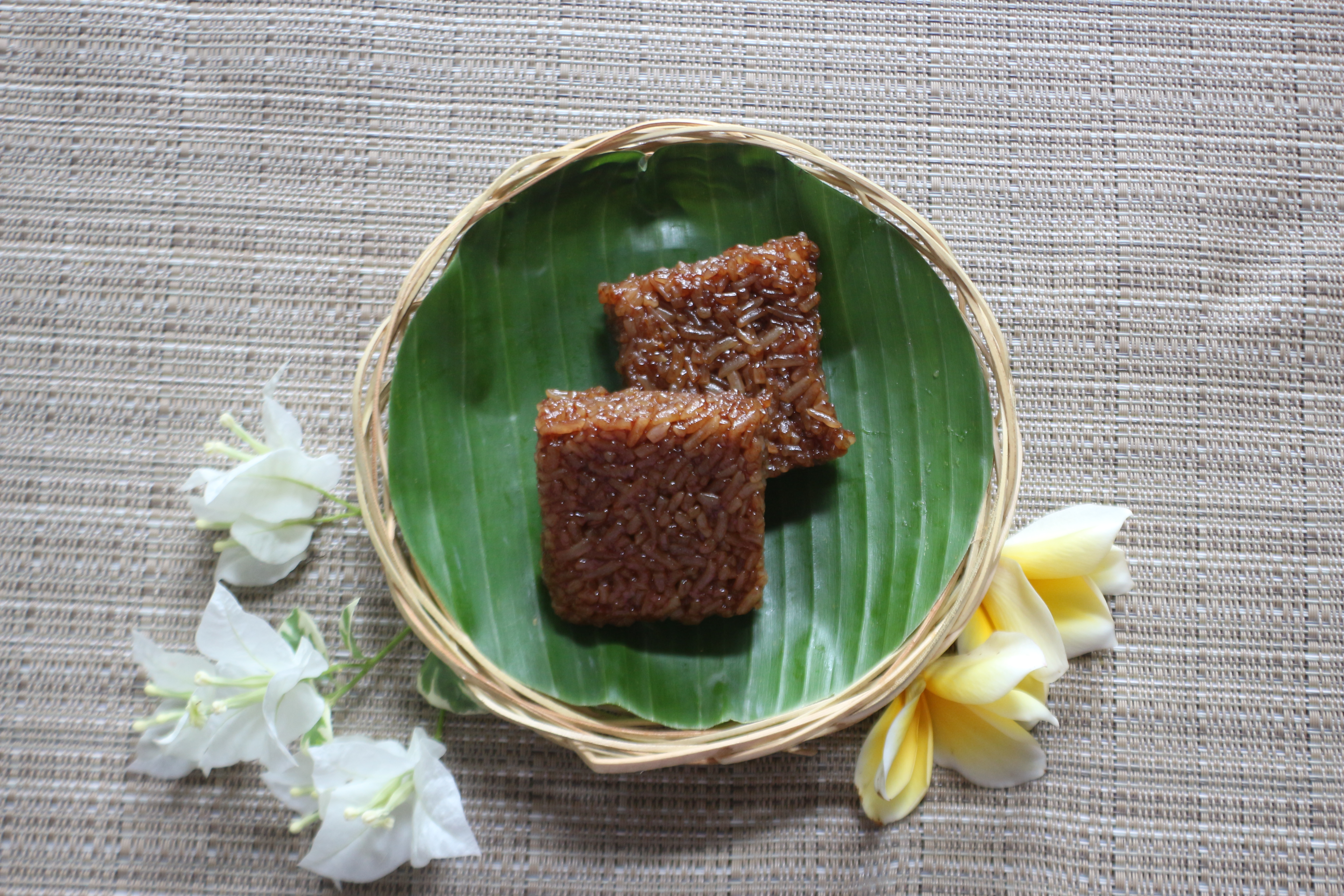
Balinese wajik, sweet glutinous rice snack, mentioned in a manuscript from Majapahit era

The earliest record about ancient form of kue as sweet snack is found in the 9th century Old Javanese Kakawin Ramayana of Mataram kingdom era, mentioning about modakanda sagula which means sugared delicacies. Sweet snack as treats are already consumed in ancient Java. Indeed, the basic ingredients of traditional Javanese kue are usually containing glutinous rice, coconut milk and palm sugar (gula jawa); all are common commodities of the agricultural kingdom in Java. The combination of these three basic ingredients are of Javanese cultural heritage and was clearly known prior to external influences.

According to Heri Priyatmoko, a historian of Sanata Dharma University in Yogyakarta, Javanese kue apem has existed since the time of the ancient Mataram kingdom circa 8th century CE, which has continued to be preserved during the Mataram Sultanate era until today. Kue apem is present in a number of Javanese royal rituals as offerings, such as during the jumenengan commemoration or the king's ascension to the throne before the Ramadhan fast. The etymology of Javanese kue apem is related to Indian appam, which possibly simultaneously occurred during the adoption of Indian Hindu-Buddhist influences into Javanese culture around the 7th or 8th century CE.

The earliest record mentioning wajik, a traditional Javanese kue of sweetened glutinous rice, is in the manuscript of Nawaruji or Sang Hyang Tattawajnana written by Mpu Siswamurti, originated from the late Majapahit era around the 16th century.

In Java, traditional kue is categorized under jajan pasar (lit. 'market buys' or 'market munchies'). The colourfully decorated jajan pasar is usually given as a food gift, or served to accompany tumpeng (the main dish) during traditional Javanese ceremonies.

The next wave of foreign influences upon Indonesian traditional sweet delicacy came from China, along with the adoption of the loanword kue, which was Hokkien in origin, into Indonesian local languages. Certain kue can trace its origin from Chinese influence, e.g. kue ku, kue mochi, bakpau and bakpia. This Chinese influence took place along with the migration of Chinese settlers since Majapahit era circa 15th century, and accelerated during VOC and Dutch East Indies colonial era around the 17th century.

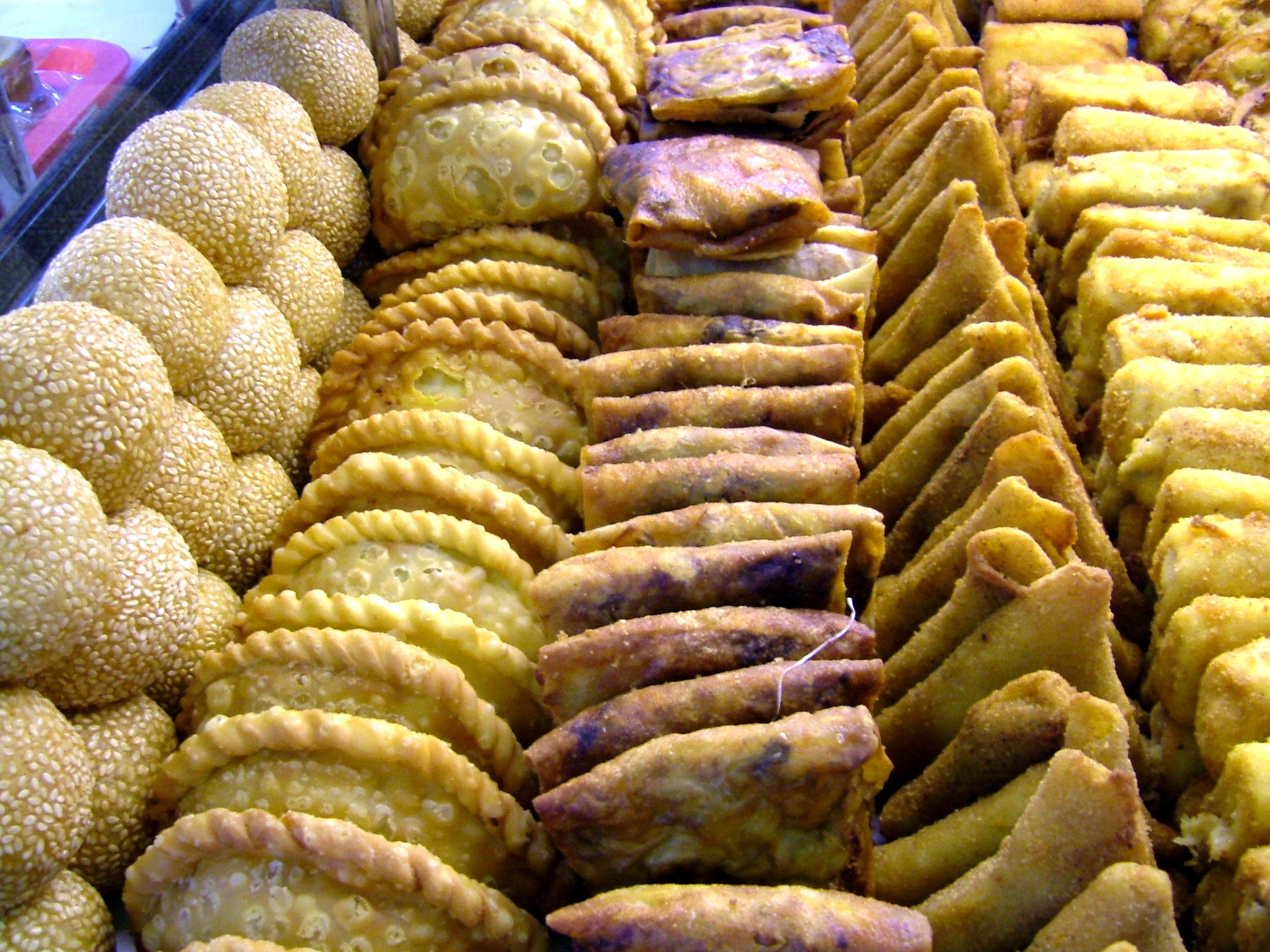
Indonesian fried snacks, from left to right: kue onde-onde, pastel, martabak mini, risoles. From those kue shown only onde-onde are sweet, the rest are savoury.

The Javanese book Serat Centhini published in 1814 mentioned several kue snacks available in Java. Among others are rangin, putu mayang, gemblong, clorot, apem, cucur, putu, cara bikang, kue sagon, kue satu, lepet, legondo, jadah, wajik, serabi, kue mendut, kue ledre, kue gubi, kue krasikan, and kue koci.

Furthermore, European influences enriched Indonesian kue diversity. Especially in cakes and pastries type, such as kue bolu which is Portuguese-influenced cake, and kaasstengels which is Dutch-influenced cheese cookies. According to culinary historian Fadly Rahman, the tradition of serving kue kering (pastries) during special occasion emerged during the Dutch colonial period. The interaction between the Dutch colonials and natives in the 19th century has led to the absorption of European culinary culture into local Indies culture. Thus, European pastries has made its way into local celebration festivities including Natal (Christmas) and Lebaran (Eid al-Fitr).

== Ingredients ==
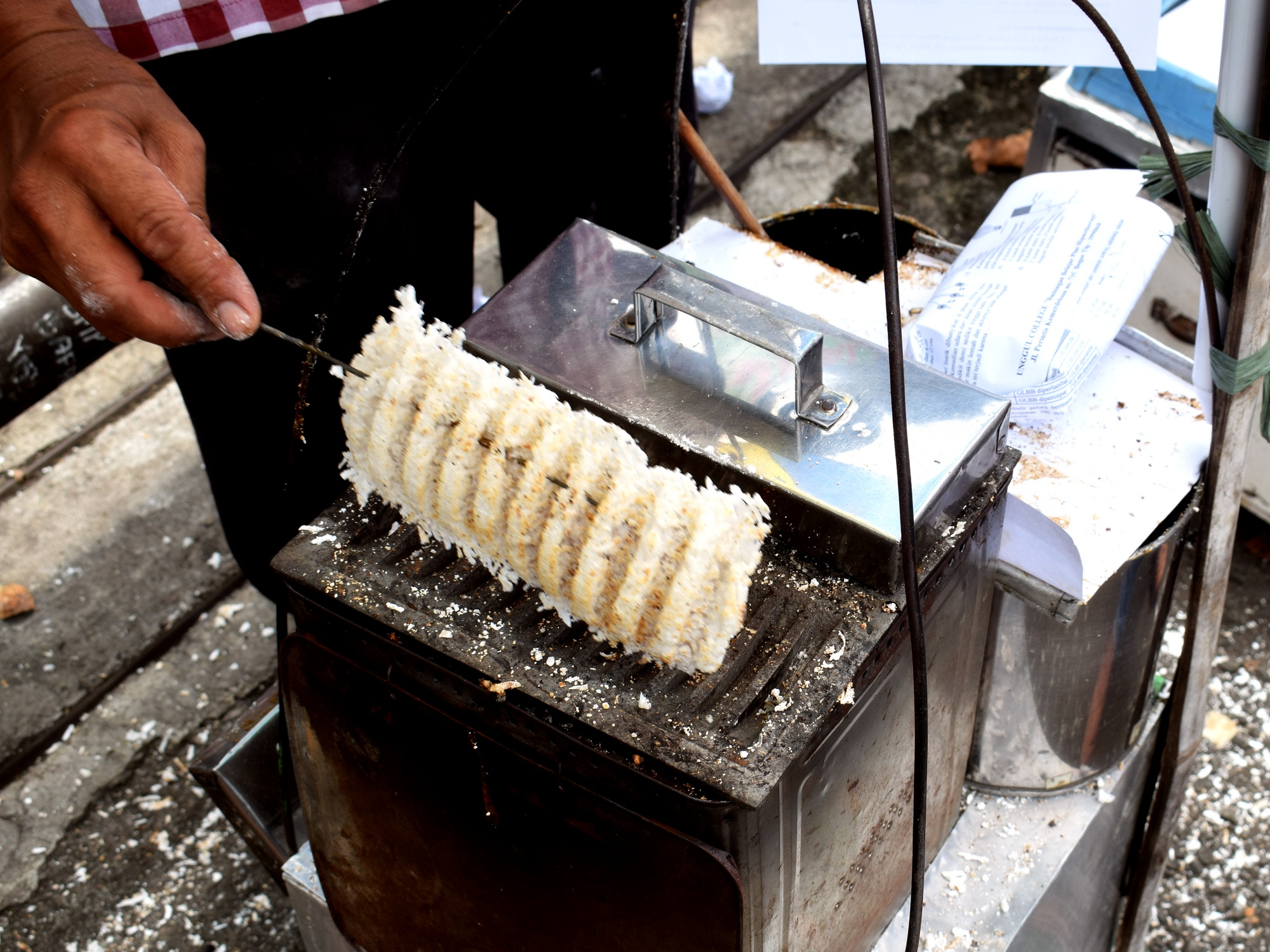
Making kue rangi coconut waffle

Many of the traditional Indonesian kue, either sweet or savoury, are based on rice flour and coconut. Traditionally, Indonesian sweets uses gula aren or palm sugar, yet powdered sugar or common sugar is also widely used. Rice flour and tapioca are probably the most commonly used flours in Indonesian kue. However, due to foreign influences, wheat flour is also frequently used. For creamy flavour and texture, traditional Indonesian cakes uses coconut milk, yet today, the use of dairy products such as milk, cream, butter, cheese and margarine is also widespread. Popular flavouring agents and spices includes coconut, peanut, green pandan, ginger, cinnamon, vanilla and chocolate.

== Availability ==
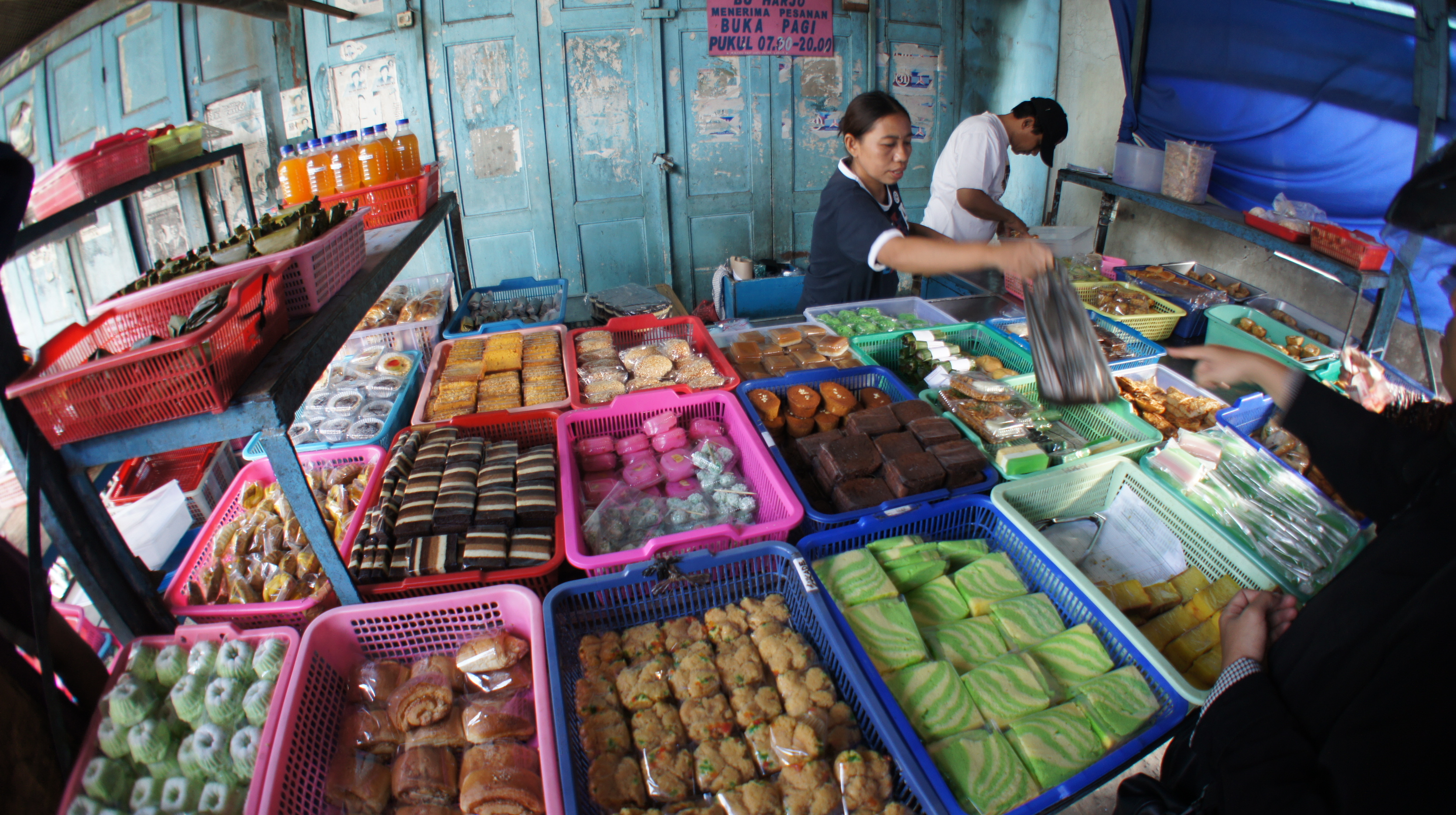
Traditional market in Yogyakarta selling various kinds of jajan pasar kue.

Today, in urban Indonesian society, kue are popular snacks for brunch or afternoon break, often to accompany coffee or tea. Various kue are often offered alongside Western pastries and cakes in cafes, coffee shops, snack stalls and warung kopi.

Traditionally, kue are made prior to certain celebration or events such as lebaran or natal, often homemade in Indonesian households and communities. For example, Keraton Yogyakarta traditionally held Ngapem ceremony, where royal households communally cook kue apem (Javanese version of appam) as a part of the Tingalan Jumenengan Dalem ceremony. Additionally, kue is a lucrative business, commonly available in pasar pagi markets as jajan pasar (market buys).

In Indonesia, kue is one of the most popular street food choices. Street vendors in wheeled carts frequent residential areas or station on busy sidewalks near marketplaces or schools. Certain kue, such as kue rangi, getuk and kue putu are known to be found in residential areas, while kue ape, kue pancong, kue pukis and kue cubit tend to be sold near marketplaces or schools.

There is also a certain marketplace that bring together the sellers of various types of kue, such as Pasar Kue Subuh Senen (dawn kue market) in Senen, Central Jakarta. This market can easily be spotted with its rows of merchants selling cakes, bread and pastries next to Senen bus station. Certain shops are focusing their business on selling kue, such as Sari Sari in Sarinah, a toko that sells kue and jajan pasar.

In the Netherlands, various assorted selections of koeé are available in Indo toko and eetcafe snack shops.

== Kue basah ==
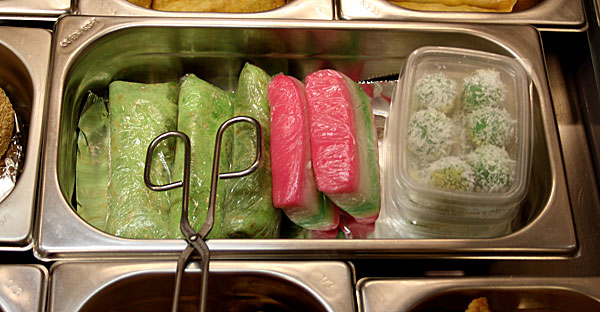
Indonesian kue (including dadar gulung, kue lapis and klepon) for sale in Indo Toko in Amsterdam, the Netherlands

Most of traditional Indonesian kue are kue basah (wet kue). Most are moist and soft in texture, and are steamed or fried instead of baked. Kue basah is usually made with rich coconut milk, along with sugar and rice flour; as a result it can not keep for more than a day or two, especially in the hot and humid Indonesian tropical climate. In contrast, kue kering can last longer. The examples of kue basah are:

- Kue agar-agar, jelly-like pudding.
- Kue ape, thin wheat flour batter pancake with thicker center, colloquially called kue tetek (breast cake).
- Kue apem, similar to Malay apam which ultimately derived from Indian appam. It is made of cassava tapai, coconut water, coconut sugar, rice flour, coconut milk, all mixed as a dough and steamed until fluffy and cooked. Served with grated coconut.
- Kue arem-arem, rice cake snack made of compressed rice cake in the form of a cylinder wrapped inside a banana leaf, filled with diced vegetables, tempeh, oncom, minced meat or beef floss.
- Kue asida, dodol-like cake made from a cooked wheat flour dough, sometimes with added butter or honey. It is popular during Ramadan.
- Kue bagea, round-shaped and creamy-coloured cake made of sago. This cake has a hard consistency that can be softened in tea or water, to make it easier to chew.
- Kue bahulu, tiny crusty sponge cakes which are made in distinctive shapes like buttons or goldfish, being baked in moulded pans. Bahulu is usually baked and served for festive occasions.
- Kue bakcang, glutinous rice stuffed with meat (usually pork) and wrapped in bamboo leaf triangles.
- Kue bakpau, baozi filled with chocolate, strawberry, cheese, mung bean, red bean, minced beef, diced chicken, or minced pork.
- Kue bakpia, bean-filled Chinese pastry originally introduced by Fujianese immigrants. Today associated with Yogyakarta city.
- Kue bakpia pathok, round-shaped sweet rolls (bakpia), usually stuffed with mung beans.
- Kue barongko, banana cake made of mashed bananas, eggs, coconut milk, sugar and salt. Then wrapped in banana leaves and steamed.
- Kue bibingka, baked rice cake made with rice flour, sugar, clarified butter, and coconut milk.
- Kue bika ambon, yellow porous cake made from tapioca and sago flour, eggs, sugar and coconut milk. Bika Ambon is generally sold in pandan flavour, although it has become available in other flavors like banana, durian, cheese, and chocolate.
- Kue bingka, cake made from mashed potato, flour, eggs, sugar, coconut milk, vanilla, milk and margarine, all mixed as dough and baked until golden brown and cooked. Probably related to Philippines bibingka cake.
- Kue bitterballen, round-shape meat-based snack, similar to kroket.
- Kue bolen, baked pastry with crust layers similar to those of croissants, made from flour with butter or margarine layers, filled with cheese and banana. Other variants use durian fillings. The cake demonstrates European pastry influences.
- Kue bolu, various sponge cakes and tarts.
- Kue bolu beras, rice muffin cake.
- Kue bolu gulung, Swiss roll cake filled with butter cream, cheese, kaya, or fruit jam. It is also very common for Swiss rolls to be sold by the slice, but some shops sell by both slice and roll.
- Kue bolu kukus, steamed bun made of flour, sugar, eggs, margarine, and vanilla or chocolate flavouring.
- Kue brem, fermented-tapai-based cake.
- Kue bugis, steamed glutinous rice flour and tapioca colored green with pandan, filled with grated coconut and coconut sugar, wrapped inside banana leaf.
- Kue bulan, circular cake shaped like the moon, white and thinner than regular mooncake. Fillings may include pork, chocolate, cheese, milk, durian, jackfruit and many other exotic fruits made into a paste.
- Kue burgo, folded rice pancake served in savoury whitish coconut milk-based soup, flavoured with fish, and sprinkled with fried shallots.
- Kue busa, sweet dessert made of eggs that are beaten until foamy with fine sugar. Formed using triangular plastic moulds and baked in the oven.
- Kue cakwe, long golden-brown deep-fried strip of dough, commonly chopped or thinly sliced and usually eaten for breakfast with bubur ayam.
- Kue cara, savory deep-fried dough with toppings of seasoned shredded tuna, a slice of chili, scallion, and celery.
- Kue carabikang, a sweet cake made of rice flour, shaped like flower-chapped and colorful.
- Cenil, rice flour-based small glutinous cake, sweetened with sugar, moulded and coloured. Served with fresh grated coconut.
- Kue cilok, ball-shaped dumpling made from tapioca starch.
- Kue cincin, deep-fried rice flour based dough snack
- Kue clorot, the sticky dough of glutinous rice flour sweetened with coconut sugar filled into the cone-shaped janur (young coconut leaf), and steamed until cooked.
- Kue combro, fritter cake made from grated cassava with round or oval shape. Combro can filled with oncom and chili.
- Kue cubit, made primarily of flour, baking powder, sugar and milk. Liquid dough is poured inside a steel plate with several small round basins to form round shape. Topped with meises (chocolate granules not unlike sprinkles). Sellers use special hooked sticks to removed the cooked cakes from the steel plate. This cake is called kue "cubit" (Indonesian: pinch) because of its small bite size.
- Kue cucur, pancake made of fried rice flour batter and coconut sugar.
- Kue dadar gulung, grated coconut with coconut sugar wrapped inside a thin crepe made of rice flour. The dadar (crepe) is usually coloured green.
- Kue dangke, traditional cheese made from buffalo or cow milk.
- Kue dodol, rice flour-based small glutinous sweets, sweetened with coconut sugar, moulded and coloured. Bakers often add fruit scents and tastes such as durian.
- Kue dodol susu, milk dodol cake.
- Kue donat jawa, traditional doughnut snack, typically savoury, made of cassava instead of potato or flour.
- Kue ganjel rel, rectangular-shaped brown cake with sesame seeds, flavored with cinnamon and palm sugar.
- Kue gemblong, made of glutinous rice flour formed into a ball, deep fried and then coated with palm sugar.
- Kue geplak, sweet cake made of grated coconut and sugar, often brightly colored.
- Kue getuk, made of cassava flour and coconut sugar, served with sweetened grated coconut.
- Kue jalangkote, fried pastry with an empanada shape and stuffed with vegetables, potatoes and eggs. Often served with spicy, sweet and sour sauce for dipping.
- Kue jemput-jemput, fritter snack made from flour and then fried. It is usually round in shape and tends to vary in size.
- Kue jongkong bangka, a three layers pandan rice pudding in a cup.
- Kue jongkong semarang, a glutinous steamed cake of grated cassava mixed with salt and whiting water. It is filled with palm sugar inside and served with grated coconut on top.
- Kue jongkong surabaya, a layered two color (green and grey) cake made from natural food coloring those are suji and abu merang.
- Kue kamir, round-shaped cake similar to apem, made from a flour, butter, and egg mixture, sometimes mixed with other ingredients such as banana or tapai.
- Kue karipap, small pie consisting of curry with chicken and potatoes in a deep-fried or baked pastry shell. It can be also filled with meat mixed with vegetables (chopped carrot and beans), rice vermicelli, and sometimes egg, then deep fried in vegetable oil.
- Kue keranjang, traditional cake made of glutinous rice flour and consumed during Chinese New Year.
- Kue keria, fried doughnuts made with a sweet potato batter and rolled in caster sugar.
- Kue klappertaart, coconut tart, specialty of Manado, North Sulawesi.
- Kue klepon, balls of glutinous rice flour filled with gula jawa (red coconut sugar), boiled or steamed. The balls are rolled upon grated coconut to coat the balls. It is called "onde-onde" in Sumatra and Malay Peninsula.
- Kue kochi, dumpling cake made from glutinous rice flour, and stuffed with coconut fillings and palm sugar.
- Kue kompia, bread cake made with lard, onions, salt and flour.
- Kue kroket, Indonesian version of potato croquette, introduced during the Dutch colonial rule. The kroket is made of potato and minced chicken inside a crepe-like wrapper and is a popular snack item in Indonesia.
- Kue ku, Chinese-origin kue of sticky rice flour with sweet filling. The same as Chinese "ang ku kueh".
- Kue laddu, a sweet dough pastry made of flour, fat and sugar.
- Kue laklak, traditional small pancakes made of rice flour, suji leaf extract and baking powder with grated coconut and melted palm sugar.
- Kue lapis, layered colorful cake made of glutinous rice flour, coconut and sugar
- Kue lapis legit, also known as Kue lapis Batavia or spekkoek (layer cake) is a rich kue consisting of thin alternating layers made of butter, eggs and sugar. Each layer is laid down and grilled separately, making the creation of a kueh lapis an extremely laborious and time-consuming process.
- Kue leker, stuffed crepe. Semicircle in shape and crusty in texture, it is generally filled with a spatter of sweetened condensed chocolate milk or grated cheese. Its name was derived from the Dutch word lekker which roughly means "delicious".
- Kue lemper, made of glutinous rice filled with chicken, fish or abon (meat floss). The meat filling is rolled inside the rice, in a fashion similar to an egg roll.
- Kue lumpia, spring roll made of thin paper-like or crepe-like pastry skin called "lumpia wrapper" with savory or sweet fillings. It is often served as an appetizer or snack, and might be served deep fried or raw.
- Kue lupis, compressed glutinous rice served with grated coconut and coconut sugar syrup.
- Kue madumongso, snack made from a base of black sticky rice.
- Kue makmur, traditional cake made from butter, ghee and flour. Served during special occasion of Eid al-Fitr and identified by its white colour and round shape.
- Kue mangkok Indonesian traditional cupcake, usually sweetened with palm sugar or tapai (fermented cassava).
- Kue martabak, stuffed pancake or pan-fried bread. This appetizer is a spicy folded omelette pancake with bits of vegetables, sometimes mixed with green onion and minced meat, made from pan fried crepes folded and cut to squares.
- Kue moci, the same recipe and derived from Japanese mochi, glutinous pounded rice flour filled with sweet peanut paste. Some variants are covered with sesame seeds.
- Kue modak, a rice flour dumpling filled with sweet coconut and jaggery.
- Kue nagasari or kue pisang, traditional steamed cake made from rice flour, coconut milk and sugar, filled with slices of banana.
- Kue nopia, palm sugar-filled pastry smaller size than bakpia.
- Kue oliebol, dumpling cake of fried bread.
- Kue ombusombus, sticky rice cake with palm sugar filling, rolled in coconut flakes.
- Kue onde-onde, the same as Chinese jian dui. In Sumatra, onde-onde refer to klepon.
- Kue ongol-ongol, sweet cake made of sago, salt, pandan leaf and palm sugar.
- Kue pai ti, thin and crispy pastry tart shell kue filled with a spicy, sweet mixture of thinly sliced vegetables and prawns.
- Kue panada, fried bread cake filled with spicy tuna.
- Kue pancong, rice flour and coconut milk cake.
- Kue pandan, fluffy cake made of eggs, sugar, and flour, flavoured with Pandanus extract, usually colored light green.
- Kue pastel, pie of crust made of thin pastry filled with meat (usually chicken) mixed with vegetables (chopped carrot and beans), rice vermicelli and sometimes egg, then deep-fried in vegetable oil. It is thought to be of Portuguese origin. Its shape is similar to Malaysian karipap (curry puff) but curry paste/powder is absent.
- Kue pastel de nata, egg tart pastry dusted with cinnamon, derived from Portuguese cuisine.
- Kue pau, word for 'bun'; sometimes written as bak-pau, literally meaning 'meat-bun', which is a bun with meat fillings.
- Kue pinyaram, traditional cake made from white sugar or palm sugar, white rice flour or black rice, and coconut milk.
- Kue pisang cokelat, savoury snack made of slices of banana with melted chocolate or chocolate syrup, wrapped inside thin crepe-like pastry skin and being deep fried.
- Kue pisang goreng, battered and deep-fried banana or plantain.
- Kue pisang molen, fried banana wrapped in stripe of wheat flour dough. The term molen refer to "mill" in Dutch, suggested its Dutch influence.
- Kue poffertjes, Dutch-influenced batter pancakes.
- Kue popiah, spring roll with Chinese-origin and Fujian-style. This dish is almost equivalent to lumpia.
- Kue pukis, cake made from egg mixture, granulated sugar, flour, yeast and coconut milk. The mixture is then poured into a half-moon mould and baked on fires. Pukis can be considered a modification of waffles.
- Kue putu, rice flour with green pandan leaf coloring, cooked with palm sugar filling, steamed in bamboo pipes, and served with grated coconut.
- Kue putu mangkok, round-shaped, traditional steamed rice flour kue filled with palm sugar, similar to kue putu.
- Kue putu mayang, idiyappam-like cake that made from starch or rice flour shaped like noodles, with a mixture of coconut milk, and served with kinca or liquid javanese sugar.
- Kue rangi, coconut waffle, made from sago flour mixed with shredded coconut and served with a splash of palm sugar sauce.
- Kue risoles, a mixture of minced meat, beans and carrots wrapped inside thin flour omelette, covered with bread crumbs and fried.
- Kue samosa, fried or baked dumpling with a savoury fillings, such as spiced potatoes, onions or peas.
- Kue semar mendem, variant of lemper, instead wrapped with banana leaf, while the glutinous rice is filled with chicken, fish or meat floss, wrapped inside thin egg omelette.
- Kue serabi, pancake that is made from rice flour with coconut milk or shredded coconut as an emulsifier.
- Kue soes, a baked pastry filled with soft and moist cream.
- Kue spiku, made with similar ingredients to lapis legit but with only three layers of plain and chocolate flavour layered cake.
- Kue talam (lit. 'tray kue'), made of rice flour, coconut milk and sugar steamed in cake mould or cups.
- Kue timphan, steamed banana and glutinous rice cake wrapped in banana leaves, from Aceh.
- Kue wajik, a diamond-shaped compressed sweet glutinous rice cake.
- Kue wingko, a traditional Javanese pancake-like snack made from coconut.

== Kue kering ==
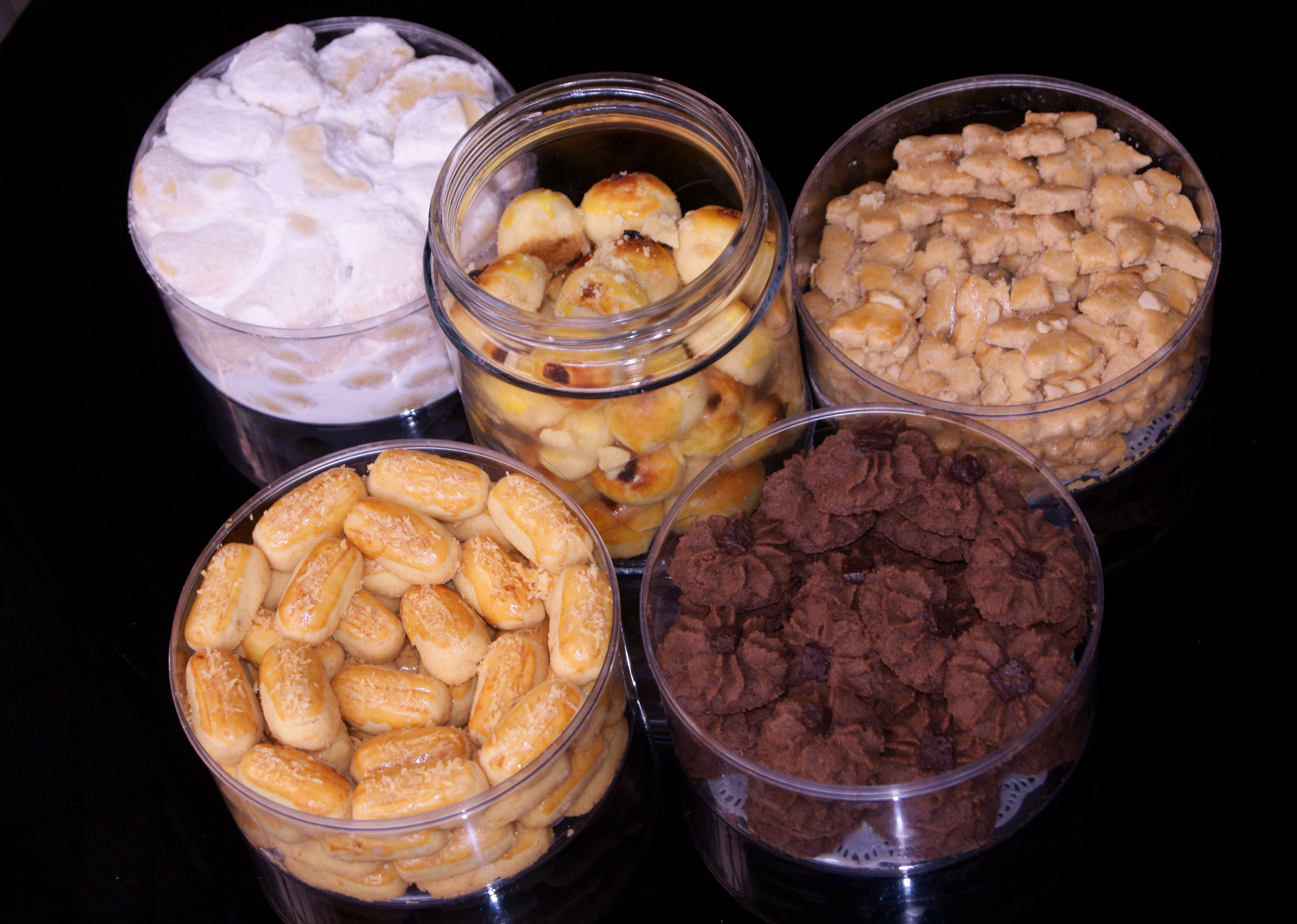
Assorted kue kering popular during Lebaran and Natal holidays, from top, left to right: putri salju, nastar, kue kacang sabit, kaasstengels (cheese cookie), semprit cokelat (choco-chip)

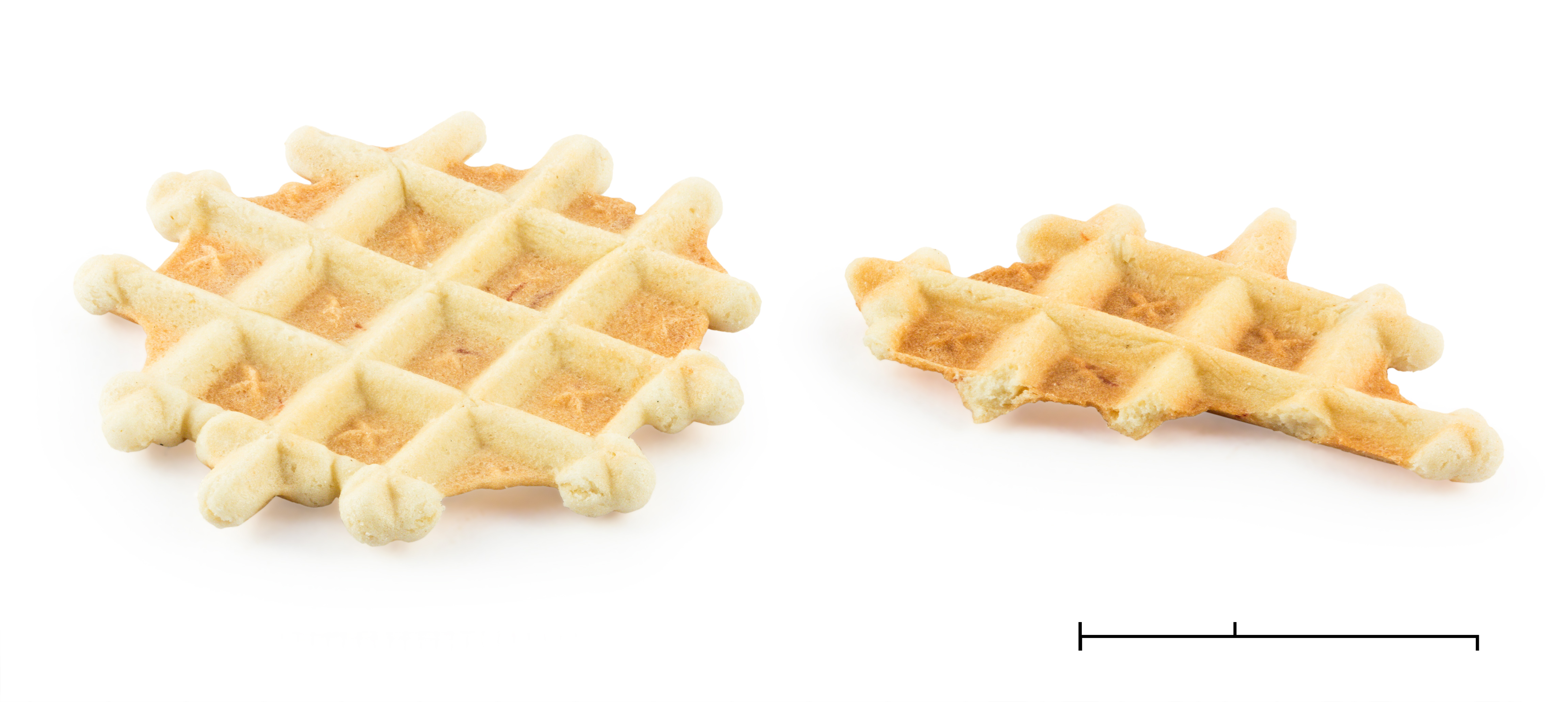
Kue gapit, a snack from Cirebon

In Indonesian language kue kering (dried kue) is identical to Western cookies. Almost all kue kering are baked or fried with minimal or no water content, and thus they have longer shelf life compared to kue basah, which easily spoil. Some variants, especially kaasstengels, plainly demonstrate Dutch origin (kaas is Dutch word for cheese). Kue kering is often served during annual holidays and important festivities, popularly offered to visiting guests during Lebaran and Natal. Examples of kue kering are:

- Kue akar kelapa
- Kue bangkit, sagoo cookie
- Kue bola keju
- Kue cistik, kue cheese stick
- Kue durian renyah
- Kue gapit, tapioca waffle
- Kue jahe
- Kue keju suiker
- Kue Kaasstengels, cheese cookie
- Kue kacang sabit
- Kue kering coklat
- Kue keciput (kue buah rotan)
- Kue kelapa
- Kue kopi kelapa
- Kue kurma
- Kue kuping gajah
- Kue lanting
- Kue leker
- Kue lidah kucing
- Kue nastar
- Kue nastar cengkeh
- Kue nastar keju
- Kue nastar lemon
- Kue putri salju, cookies coated with white powdered sugar
- Kue semprong, cone shaped pastry
- Kue sagu
- Kue sagu keju
- Kue satu or kue koya
- Kue semprit
- Kue sus kering keju
- Kue tambang
- Kue telur gabus

== Gallery ==
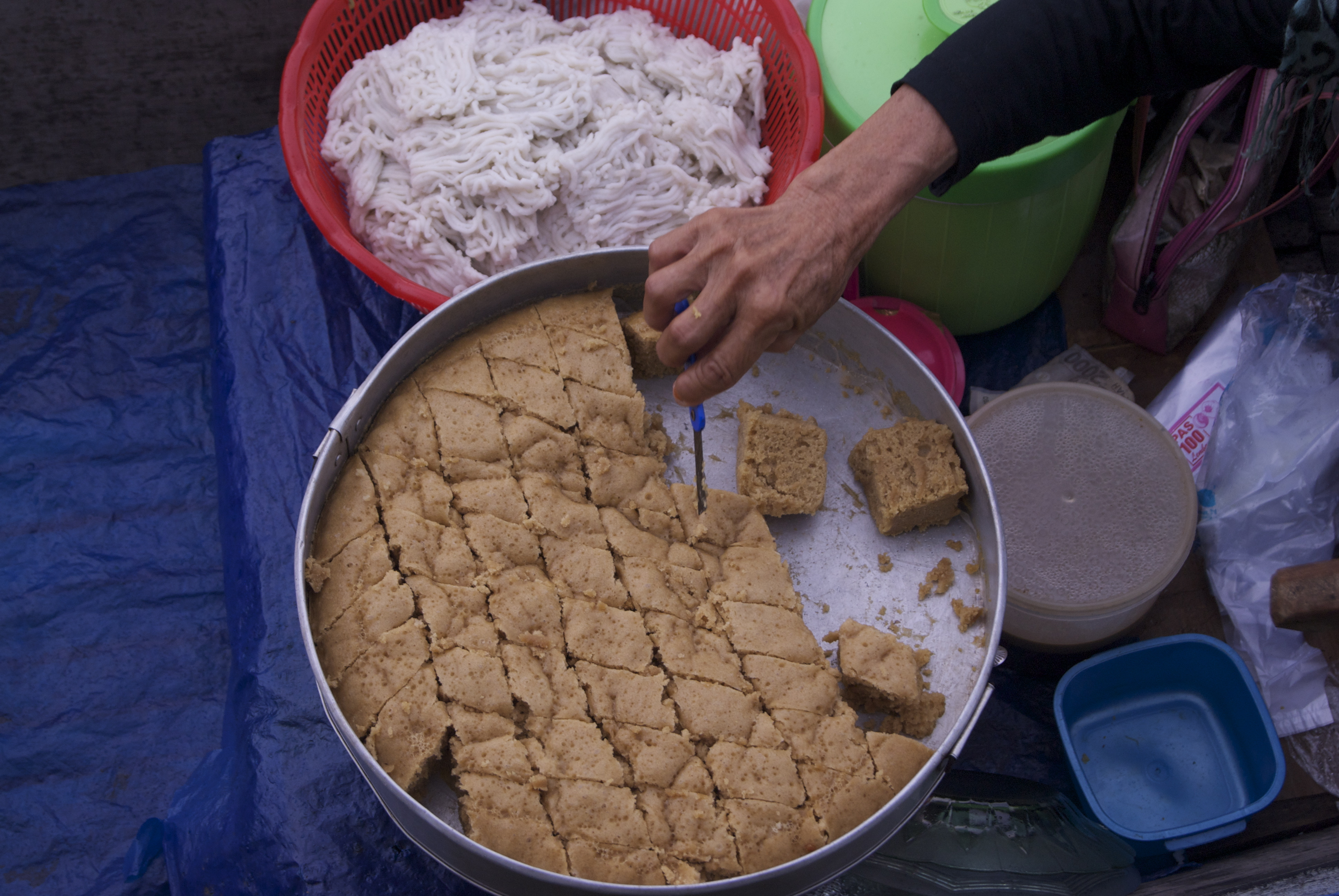
Kue apem at Lok Baintan Floating Market

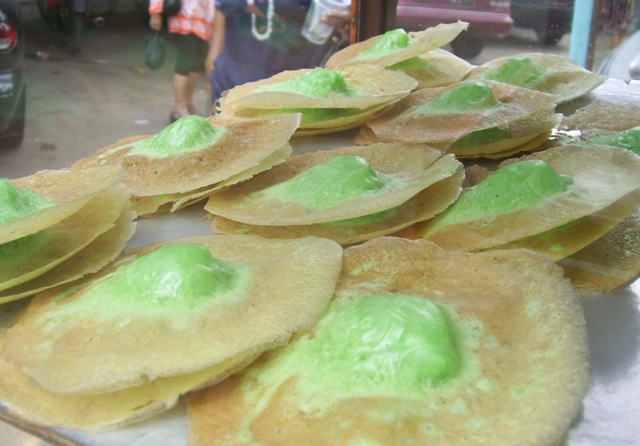
Kue ape

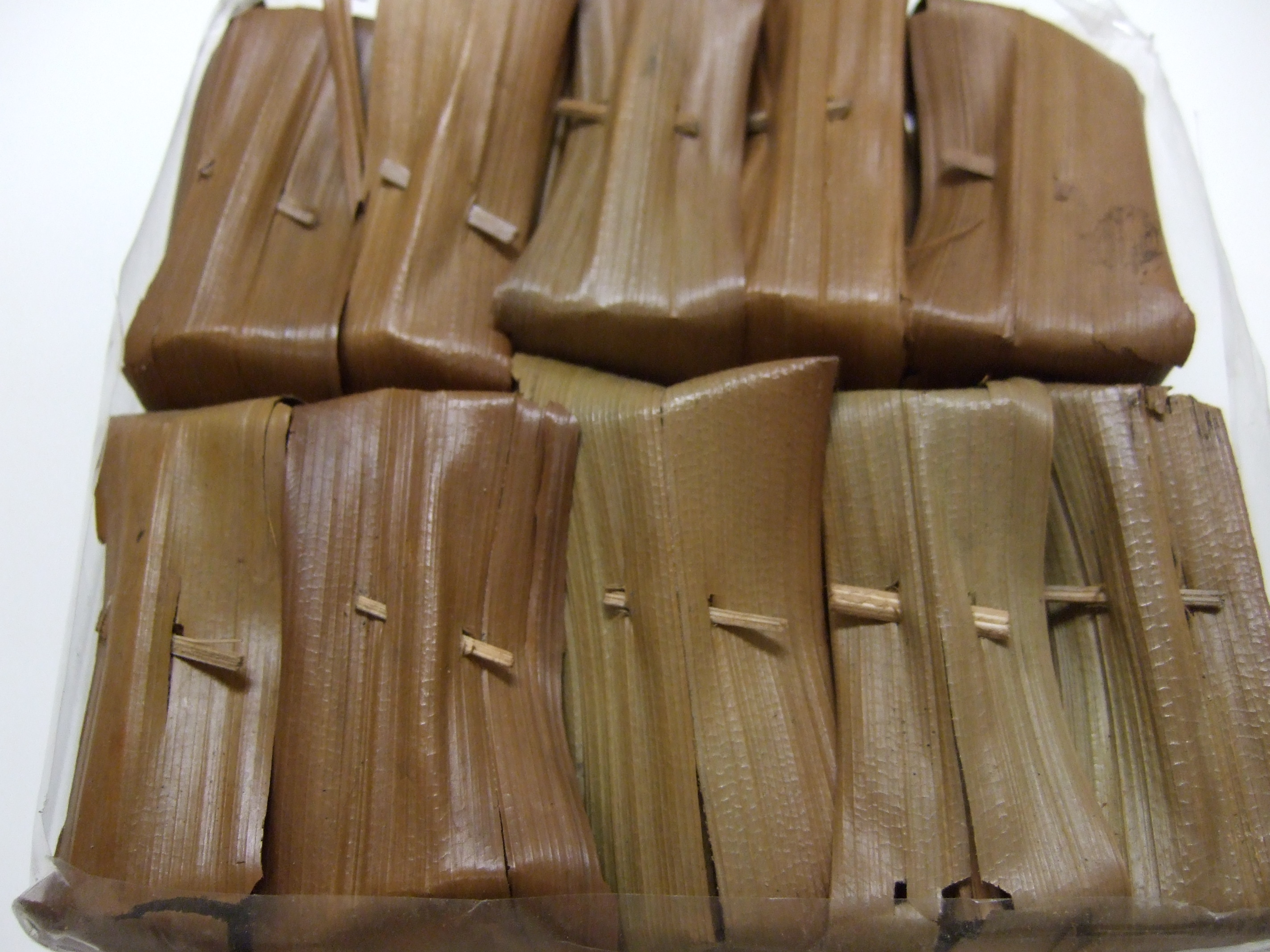
Kue bagea kenari

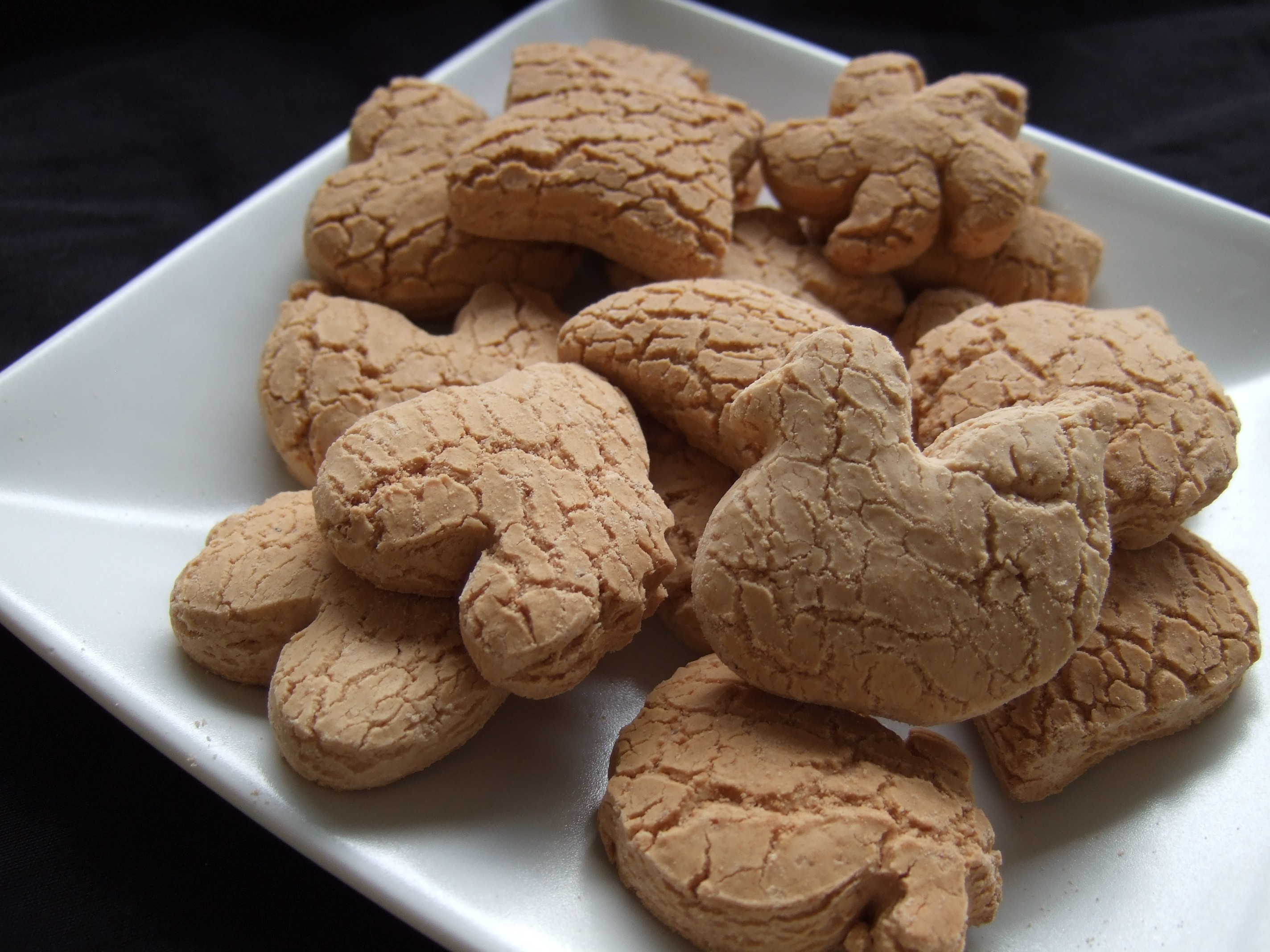
Kue bangkit

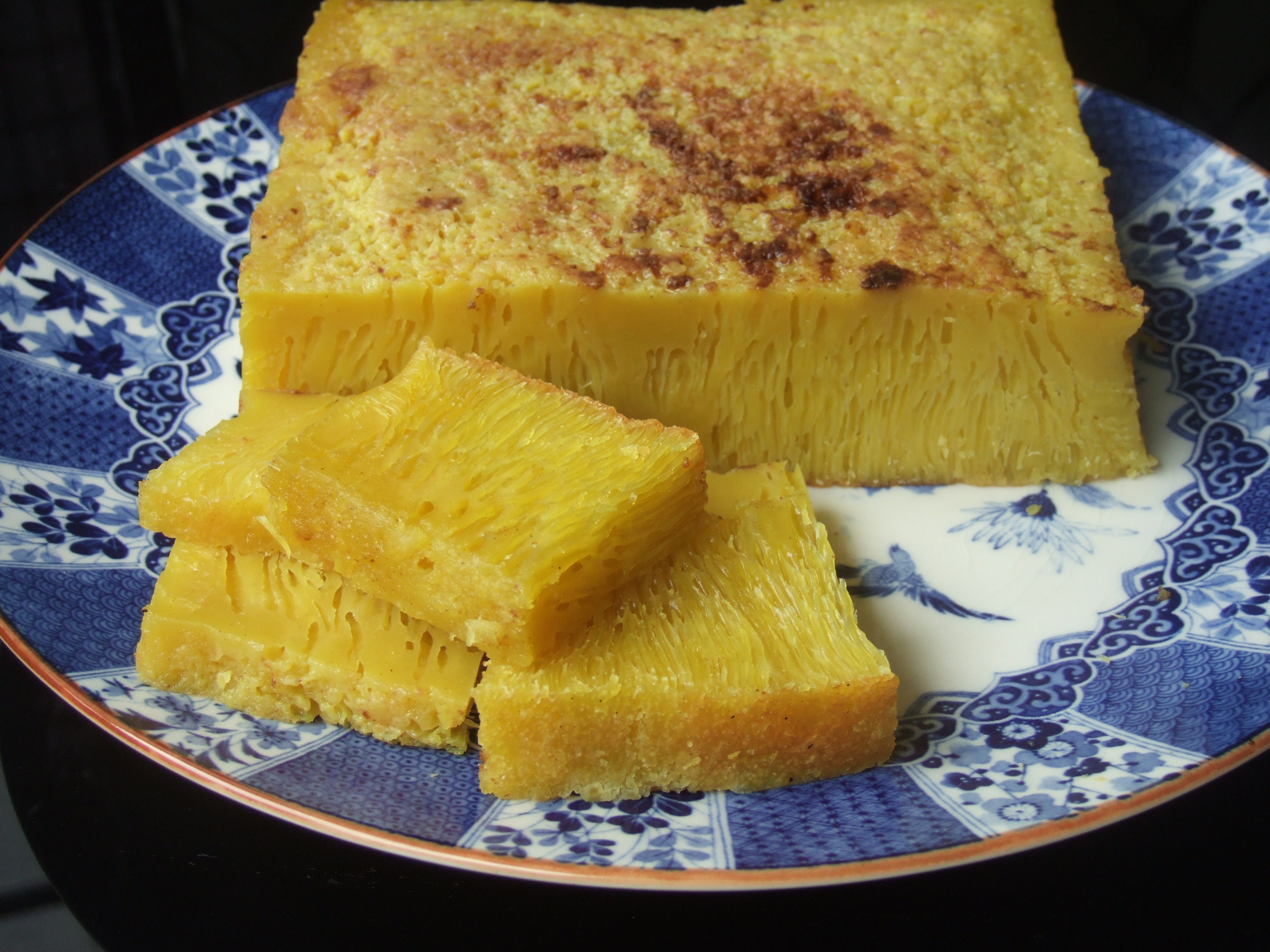
Kue bika Ambon

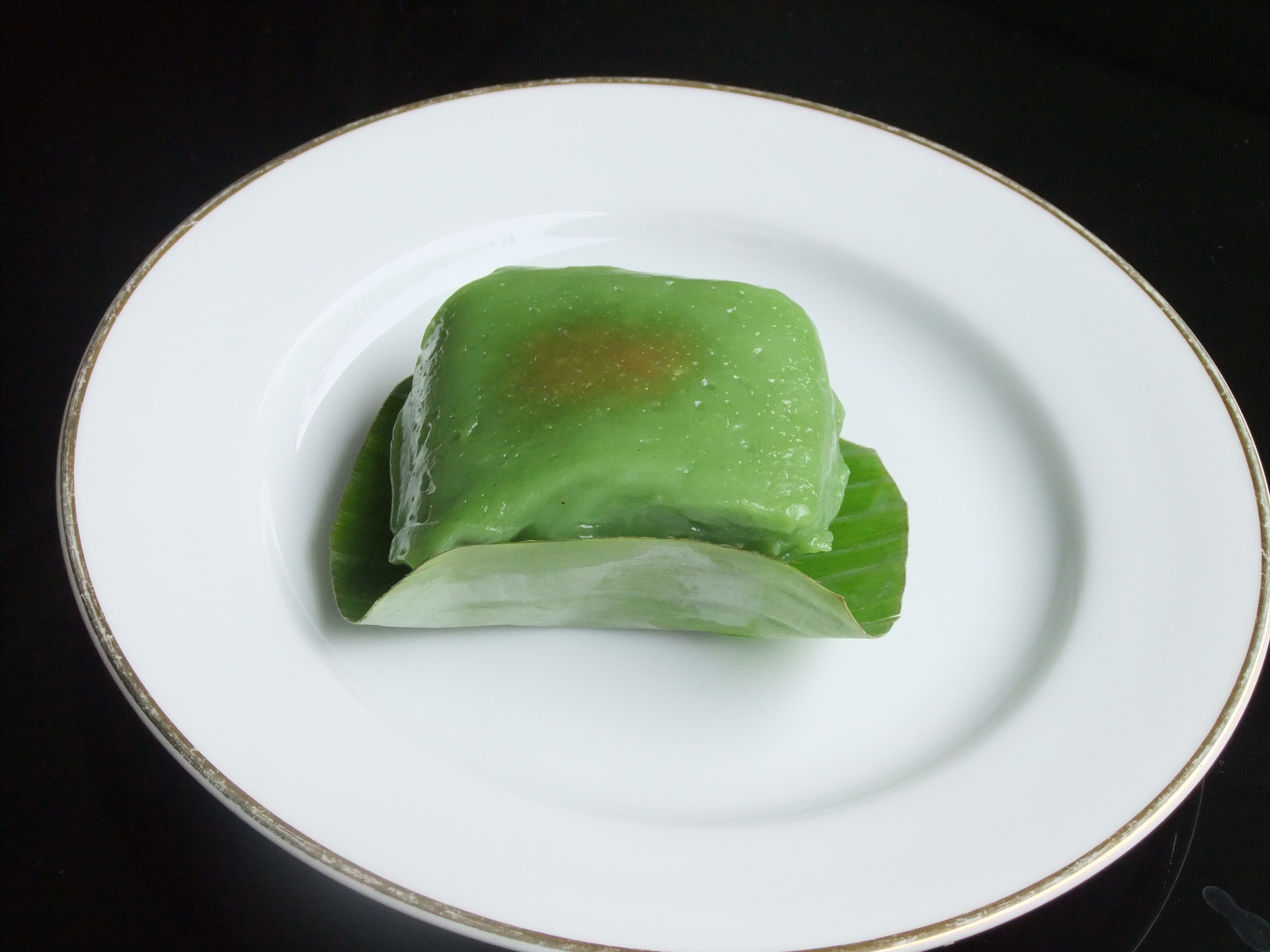
Kue bugis

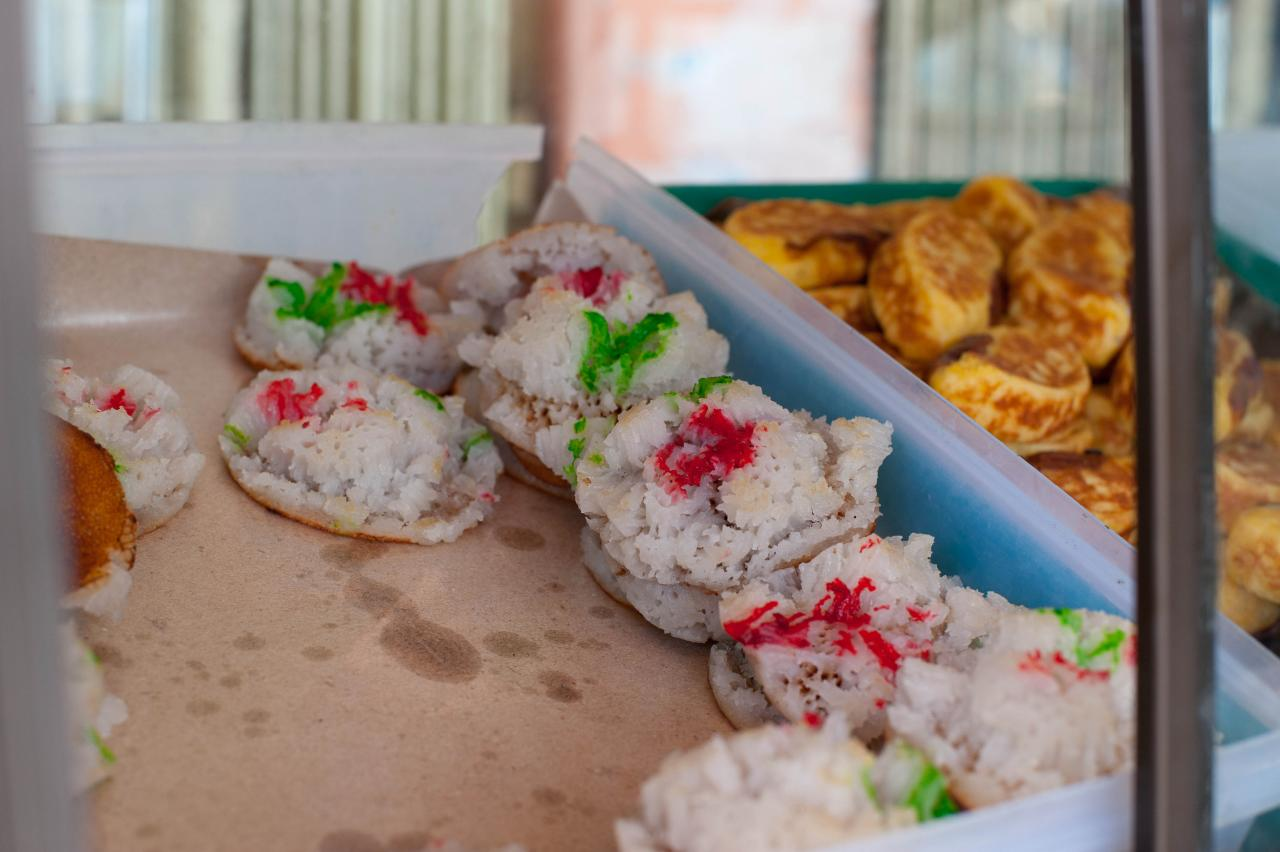
Kue carabikang

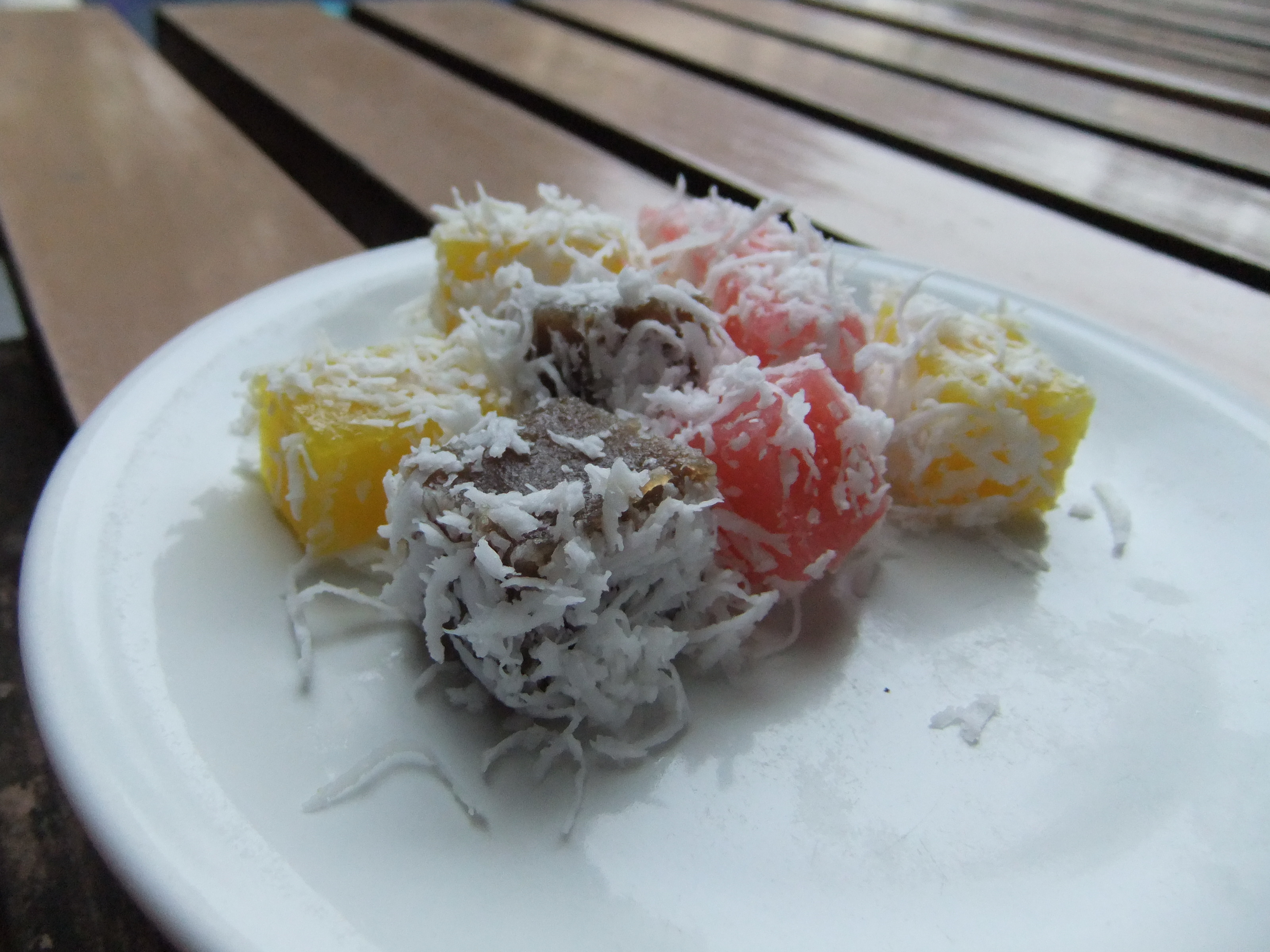
Kue cenil

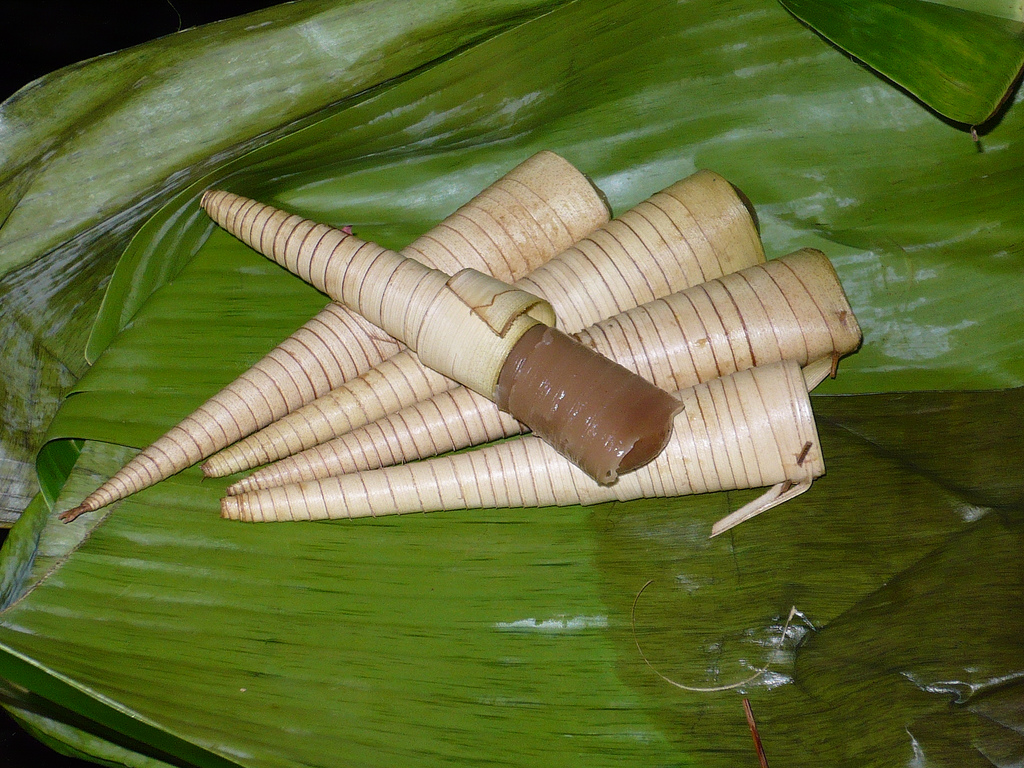
Kue clorot or cerorot

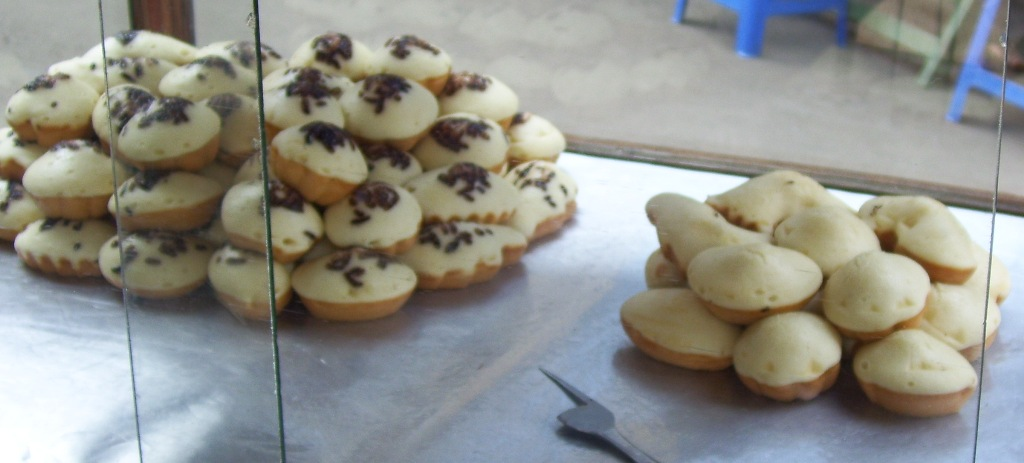
Kue cubit

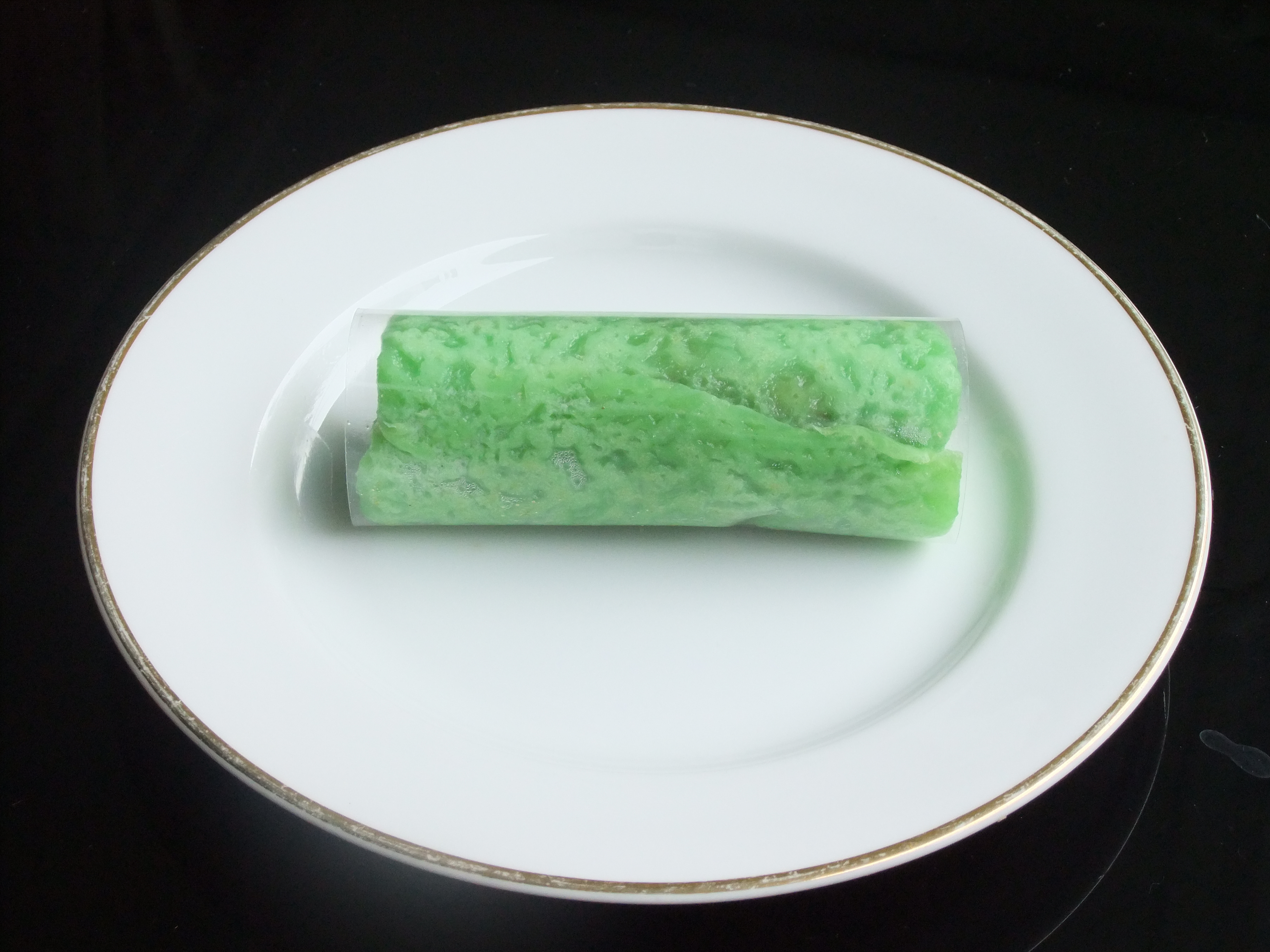
Kue dadar gulung

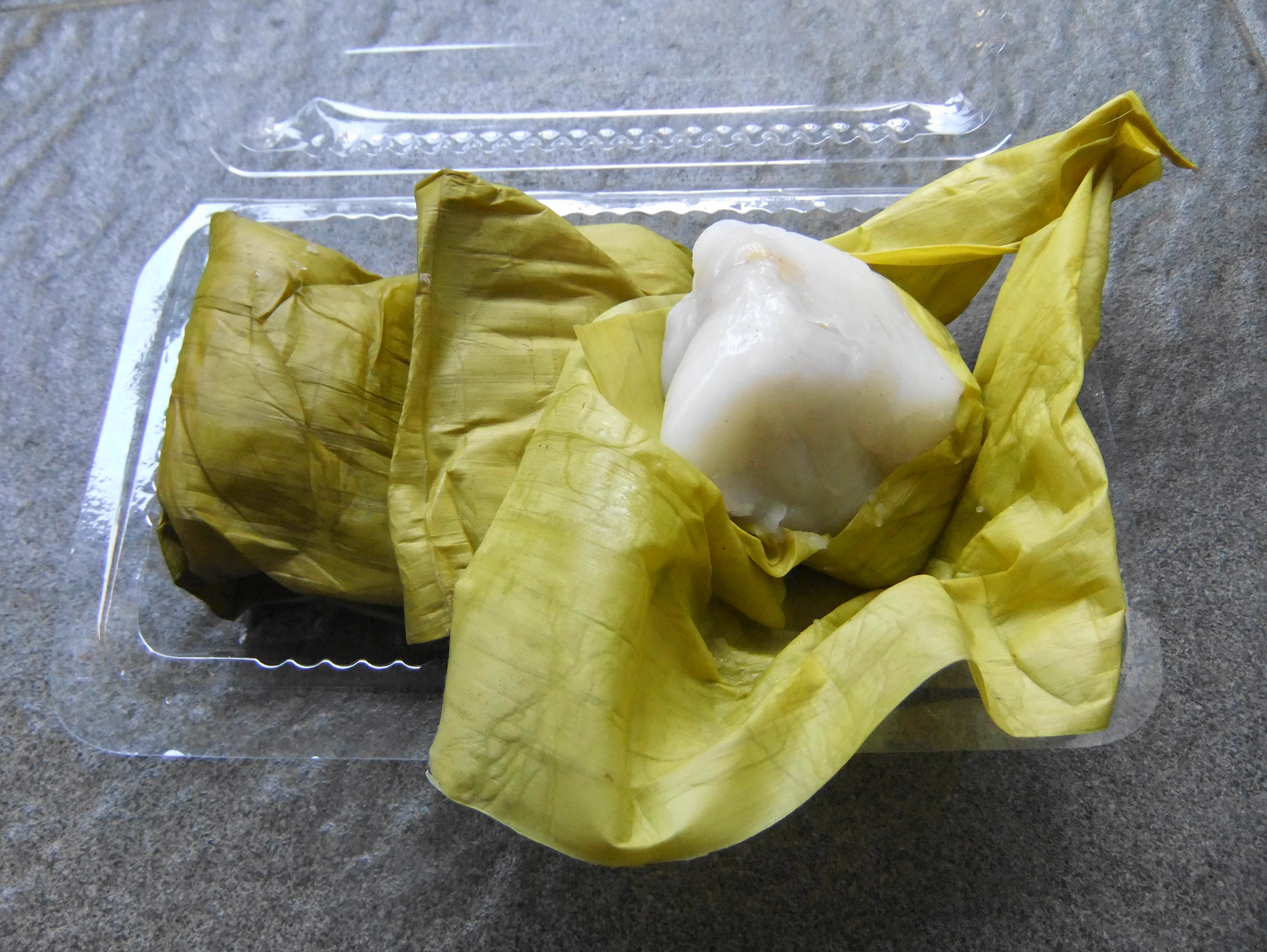
Kue nagasari

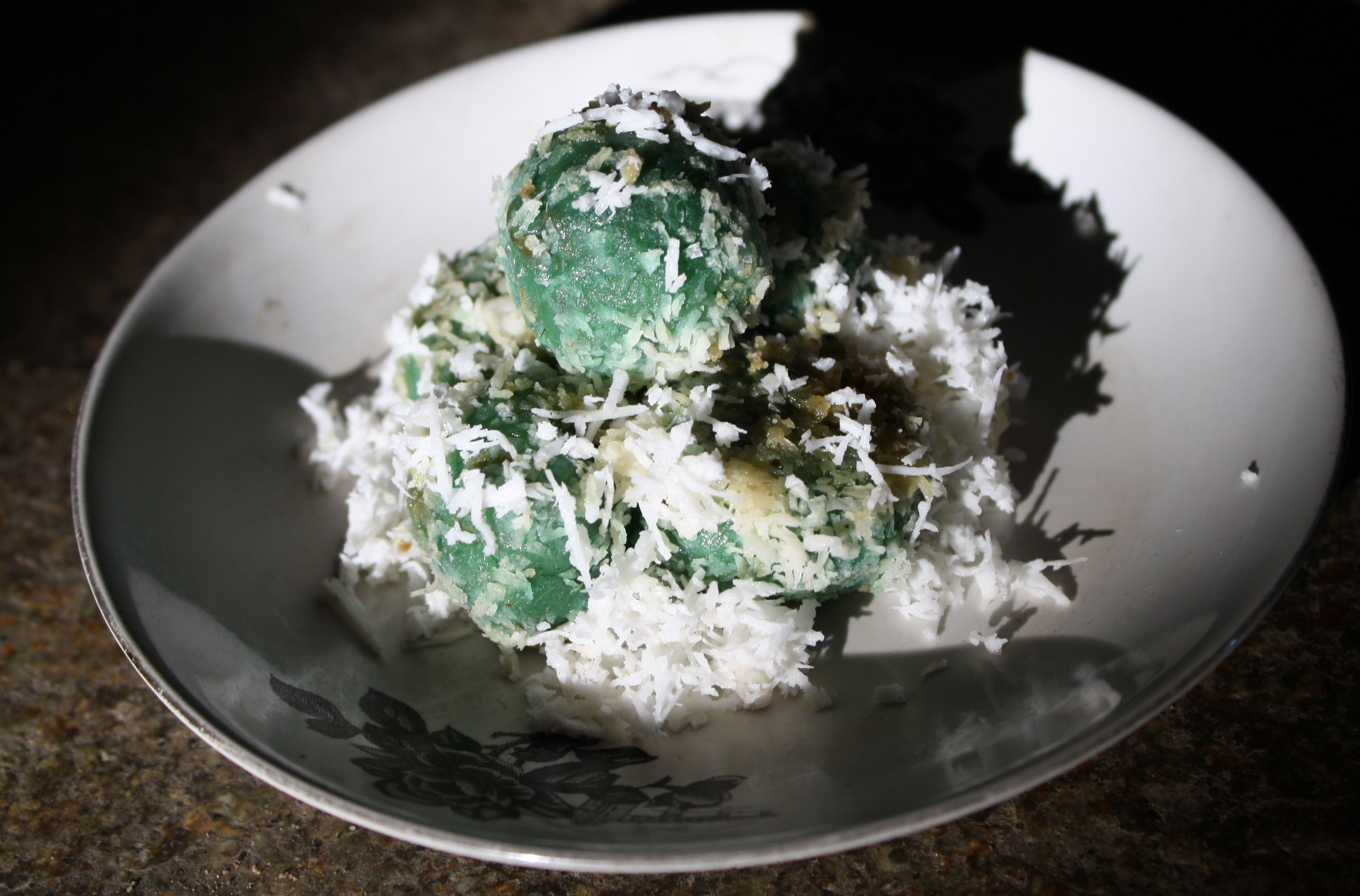
Kue klepon

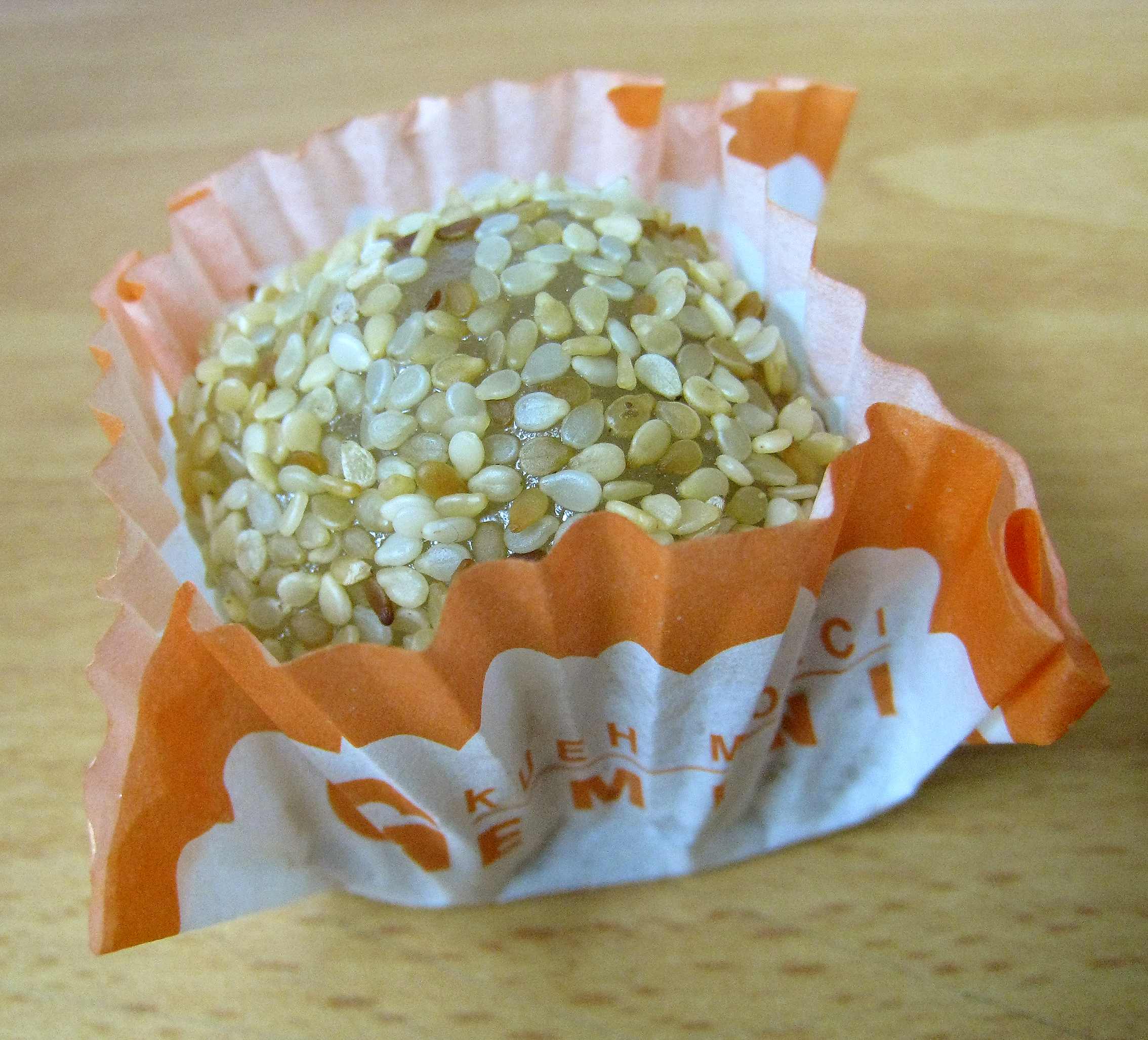
Kue moci

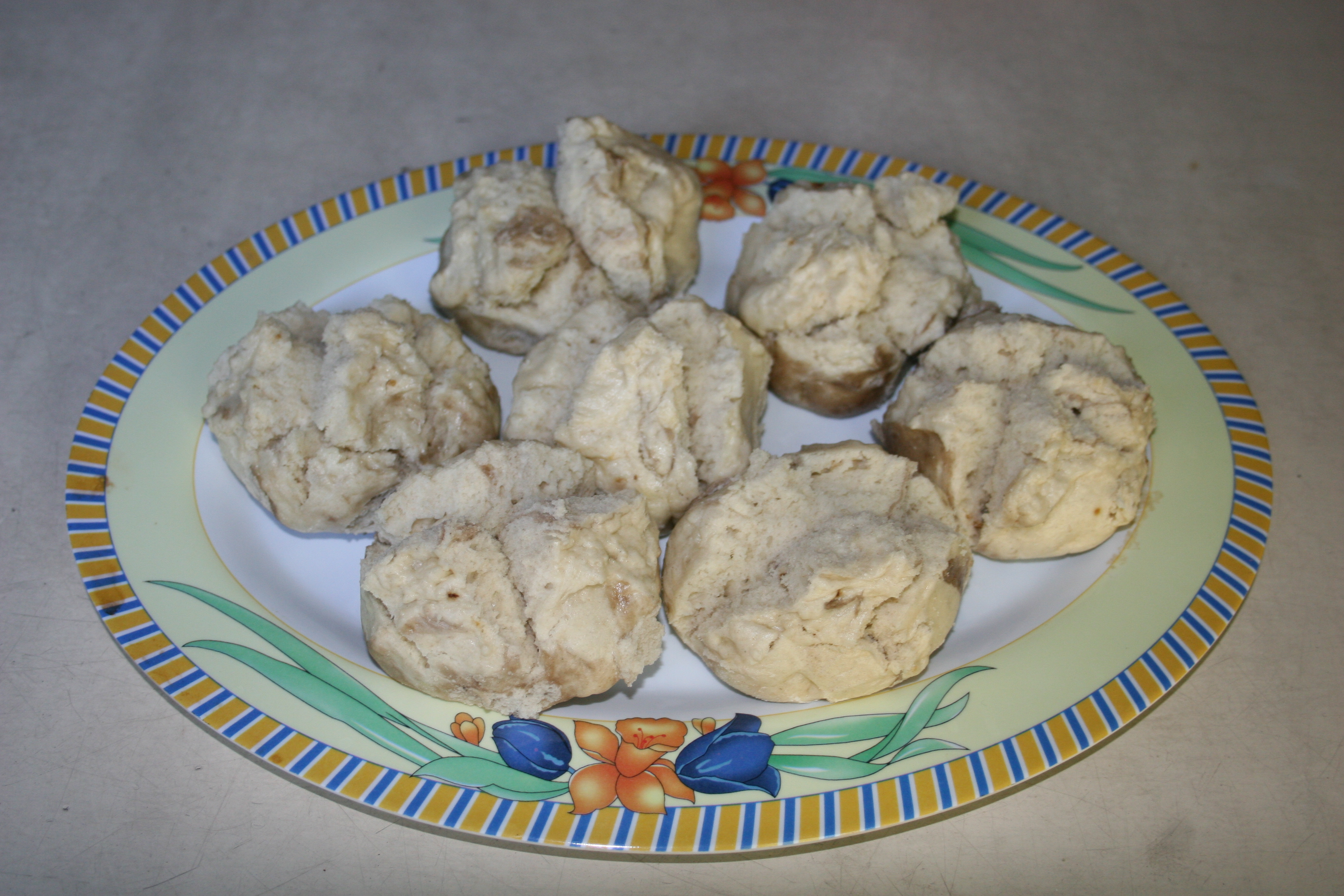
Kue moho

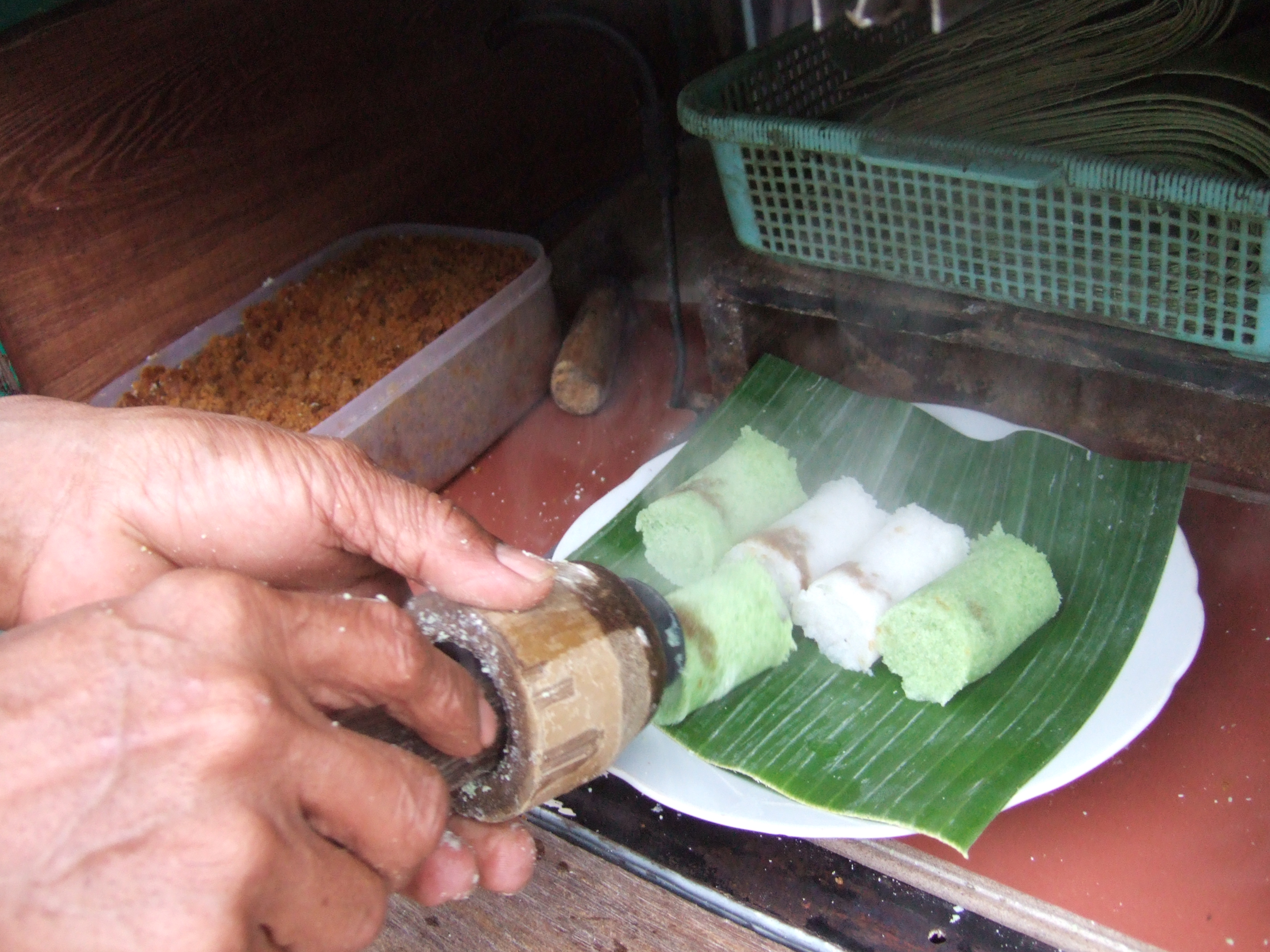
Kue putu

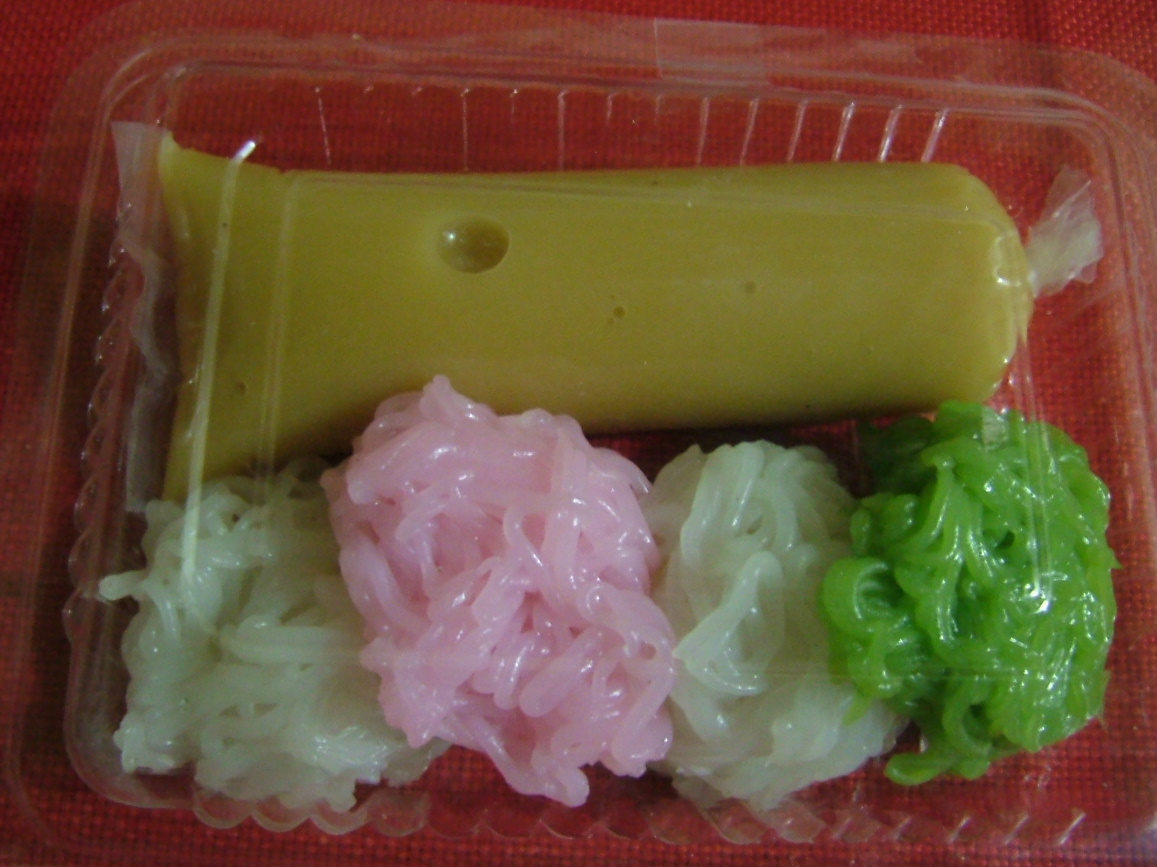
Kue putu mayang

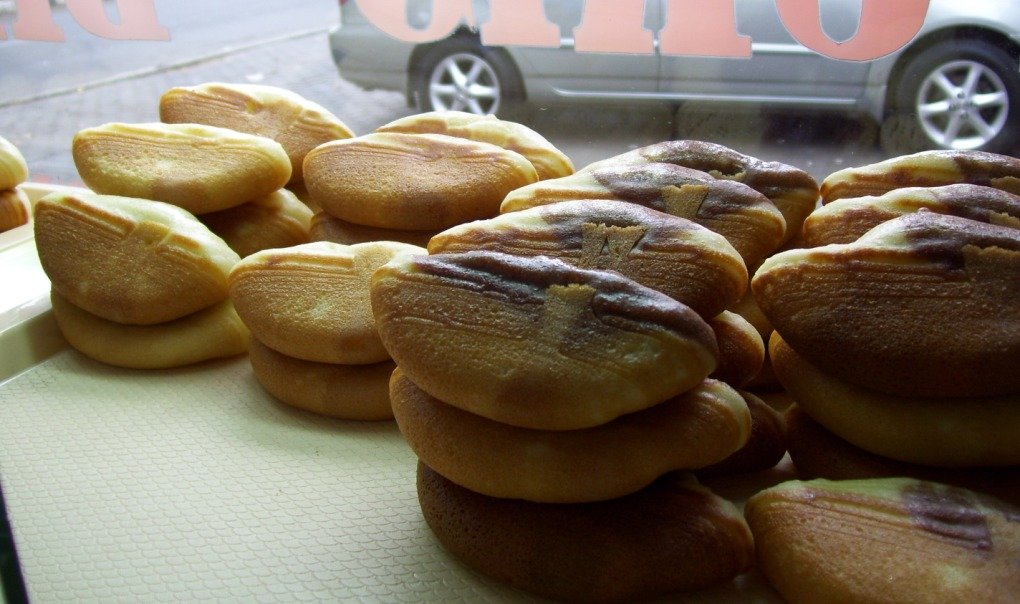
Kue pukis

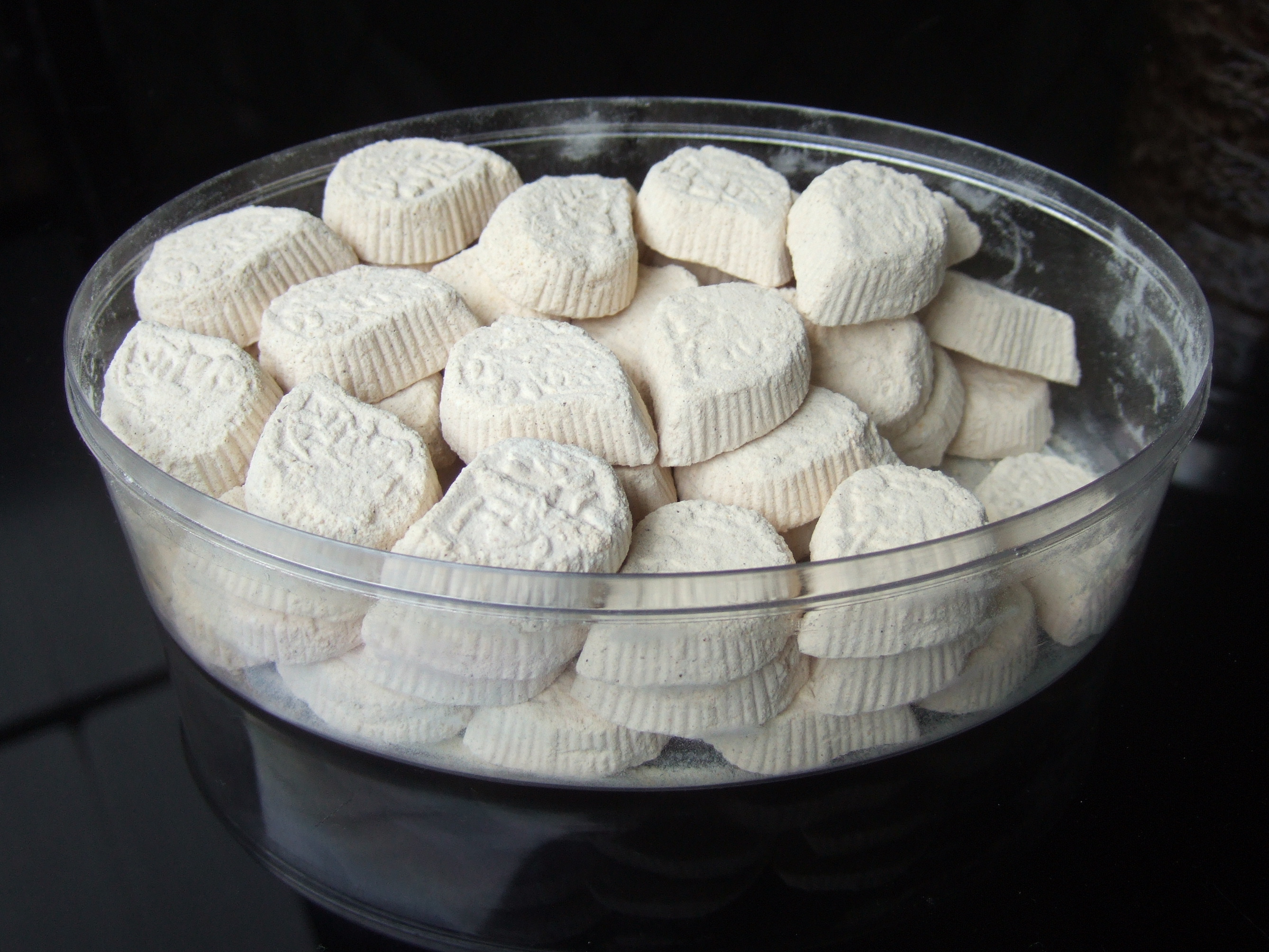
Kue satu

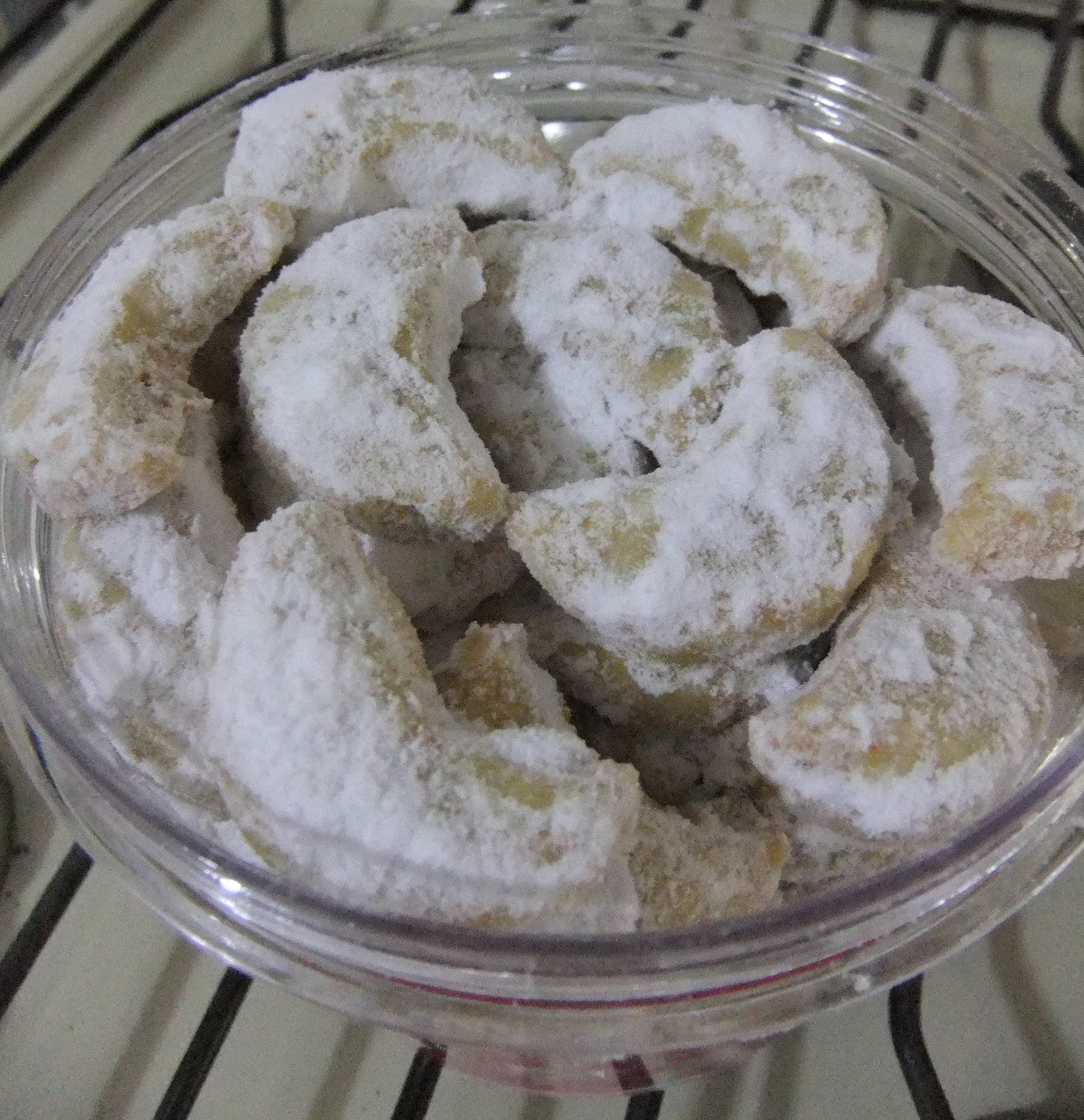
Putri salju

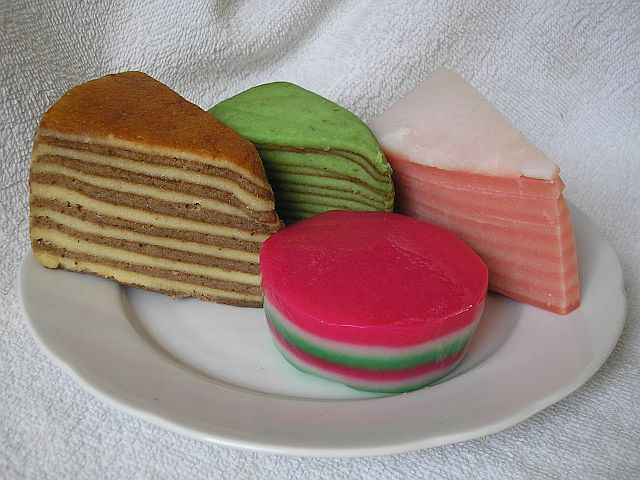
Lapis legit and kue lapis

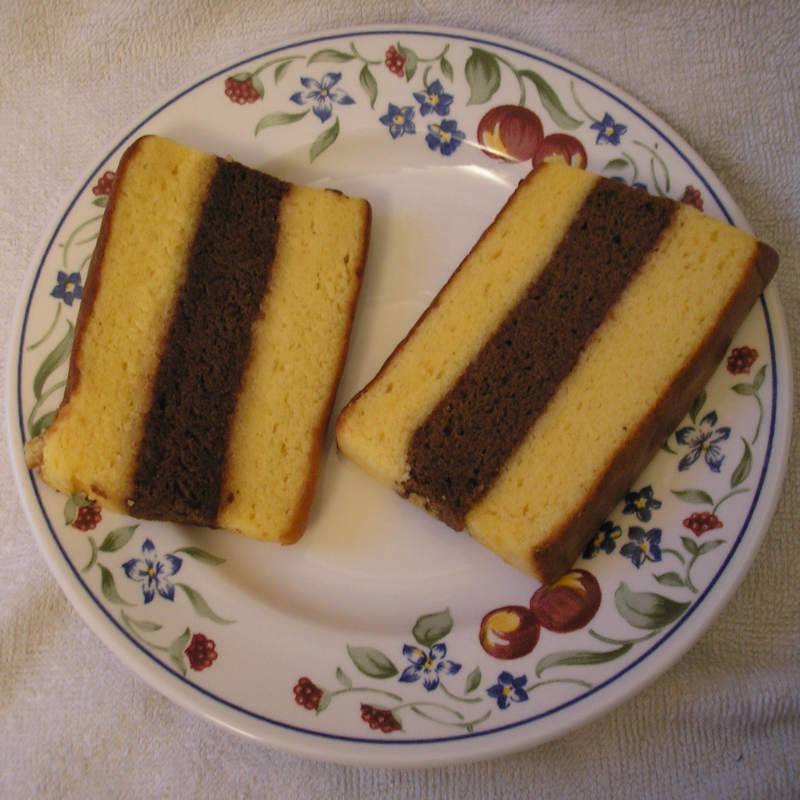
Kue lapis Surabaya

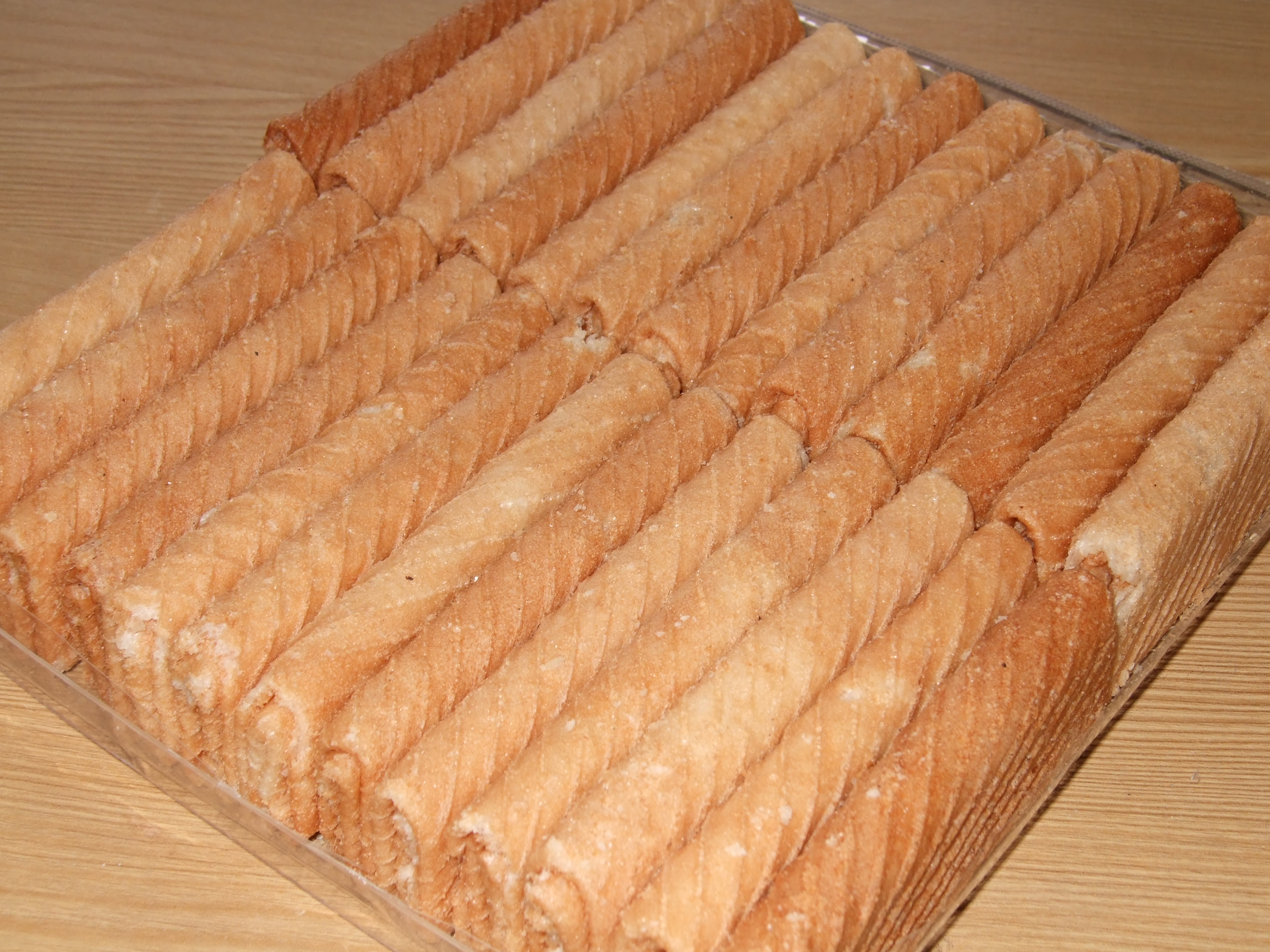
Kue semprong

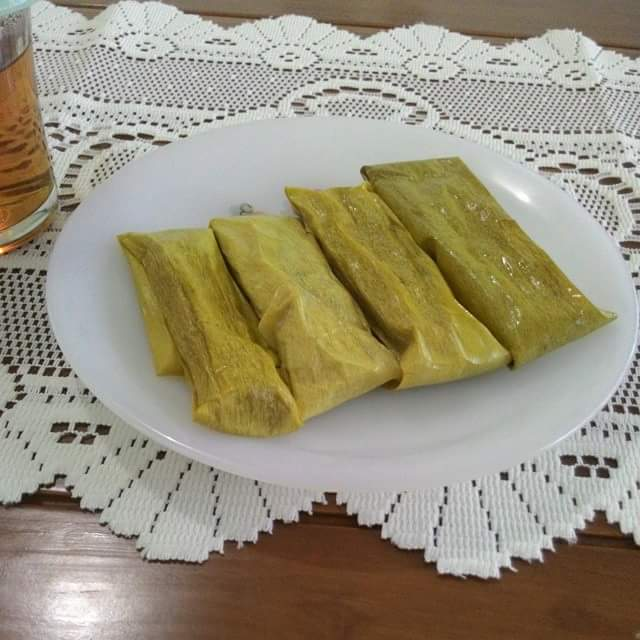
Kue timphan

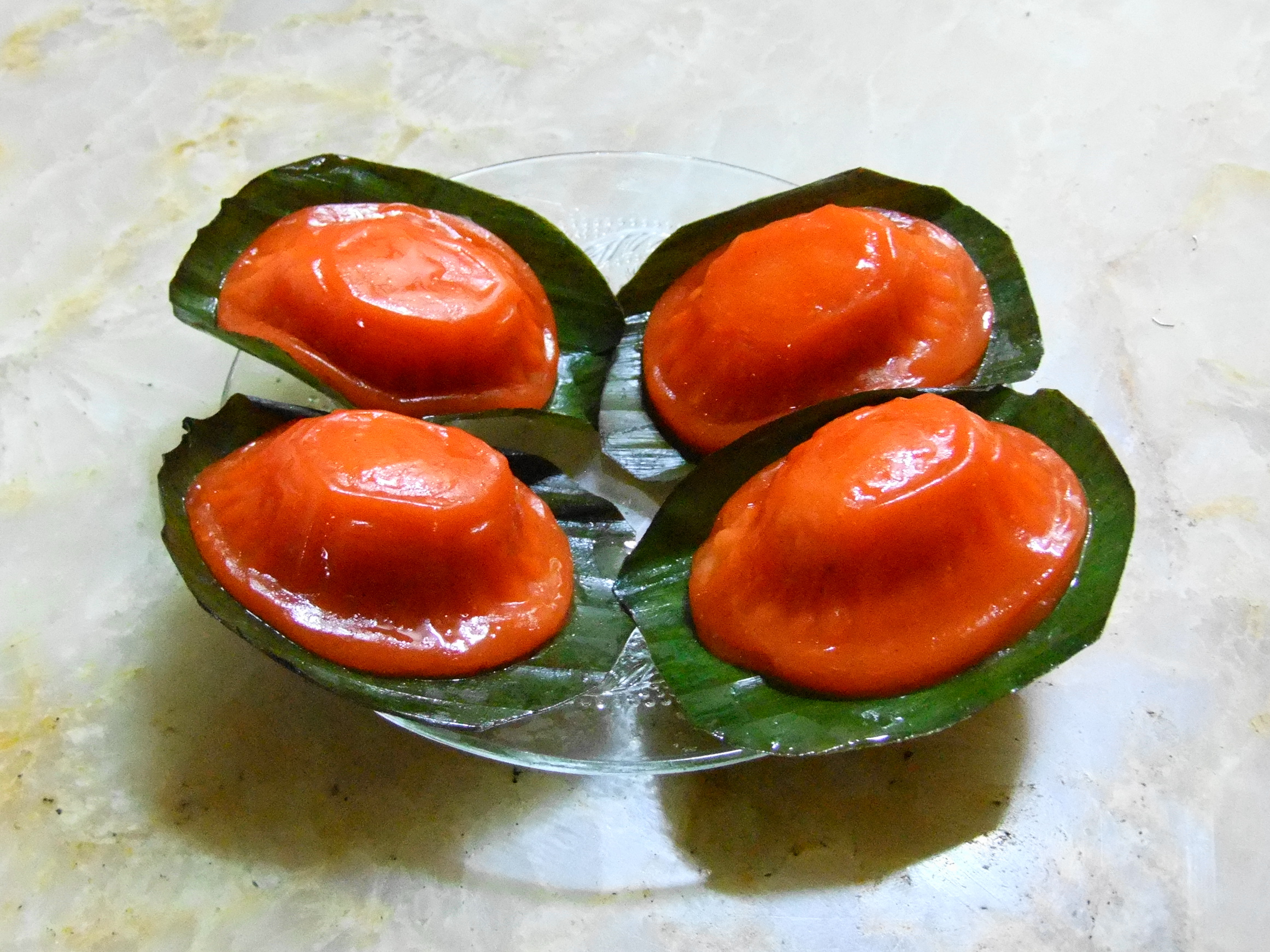
Kue ku, derived from Chinese Ang Ku Kueh

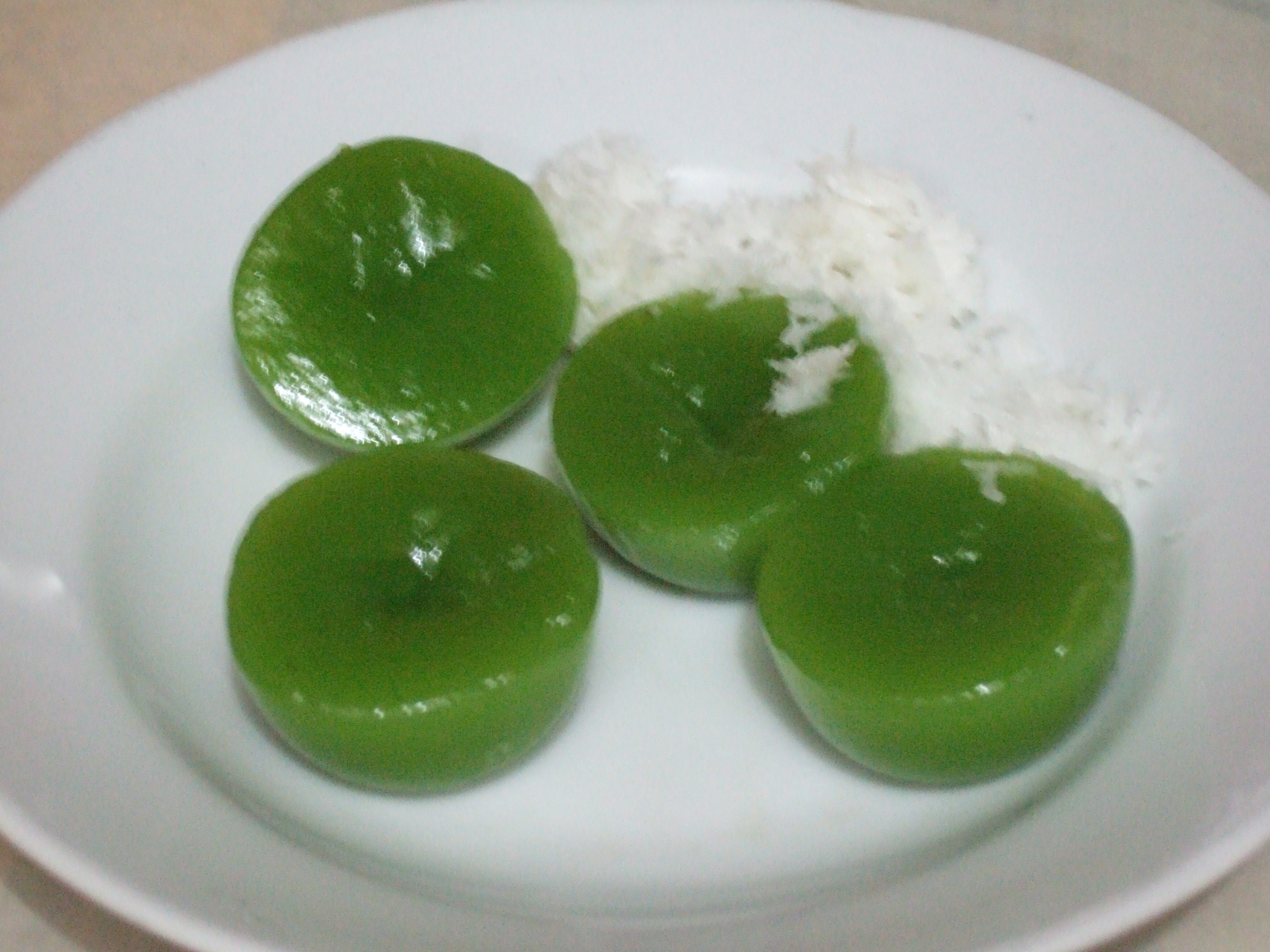
Kue lumpang

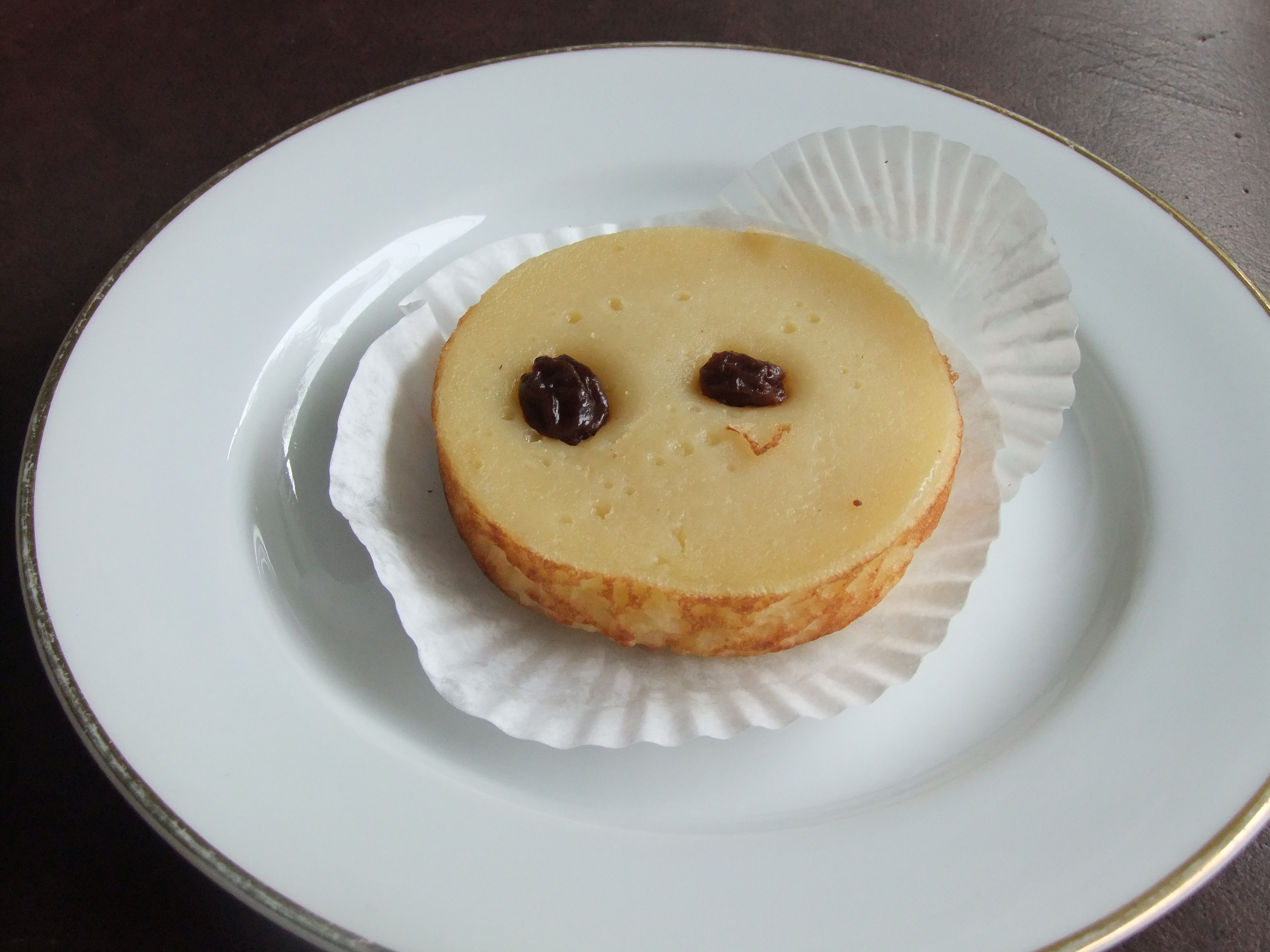
Kue lumpur surga

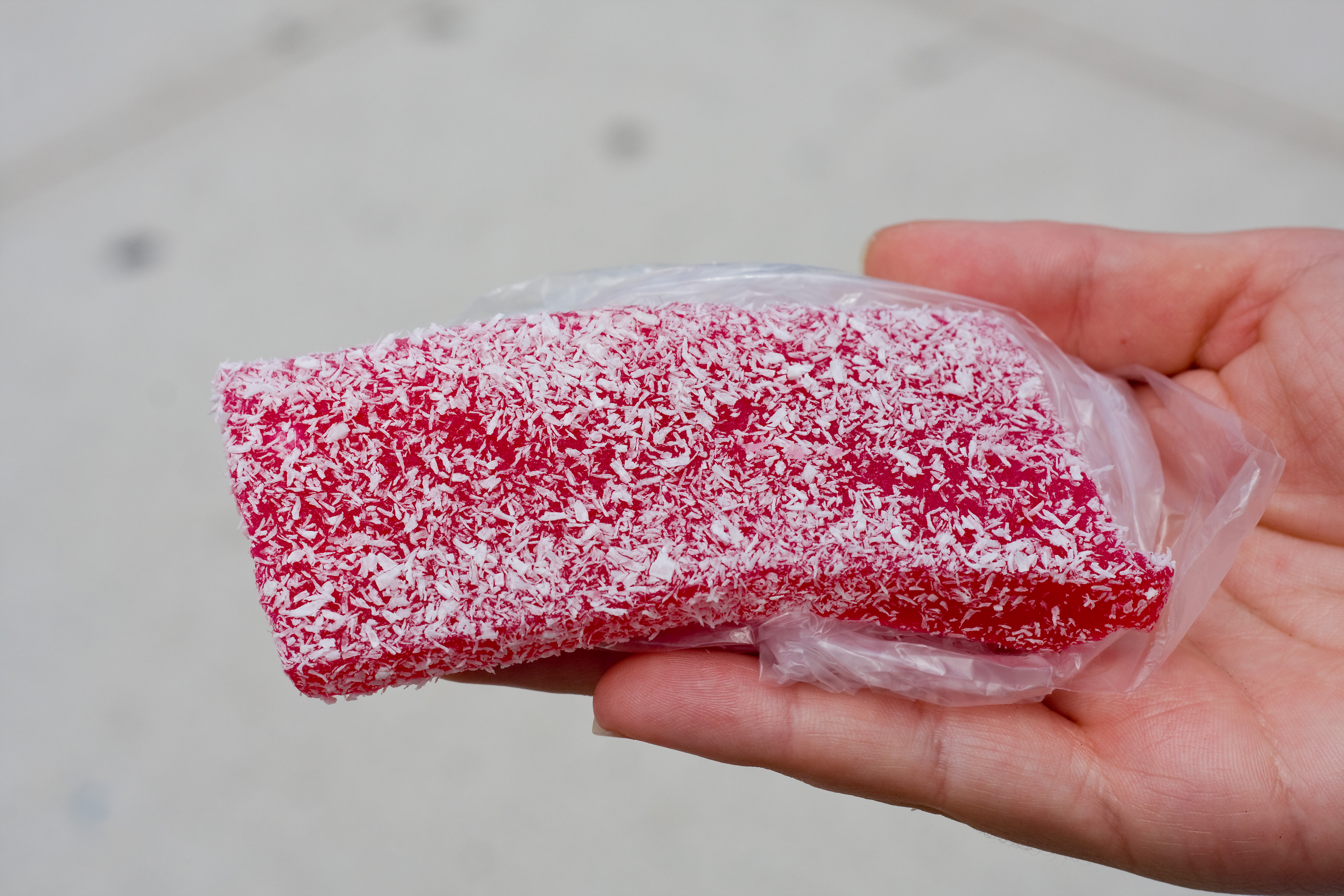
Kue ongol-ongol

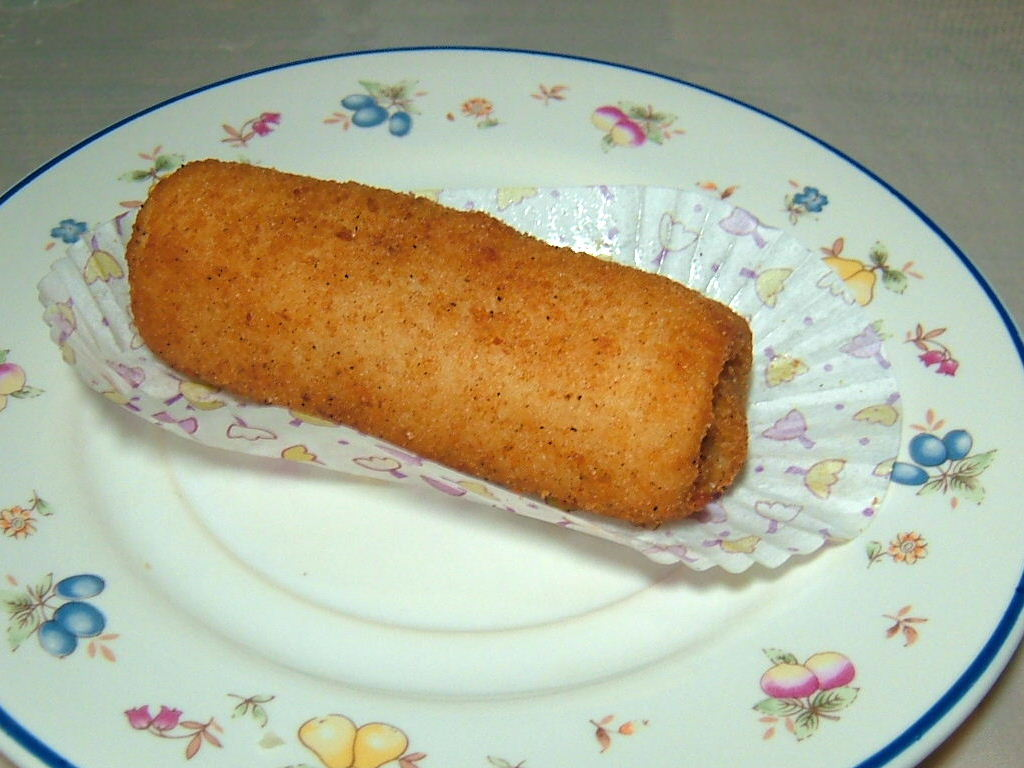
Kue risoles

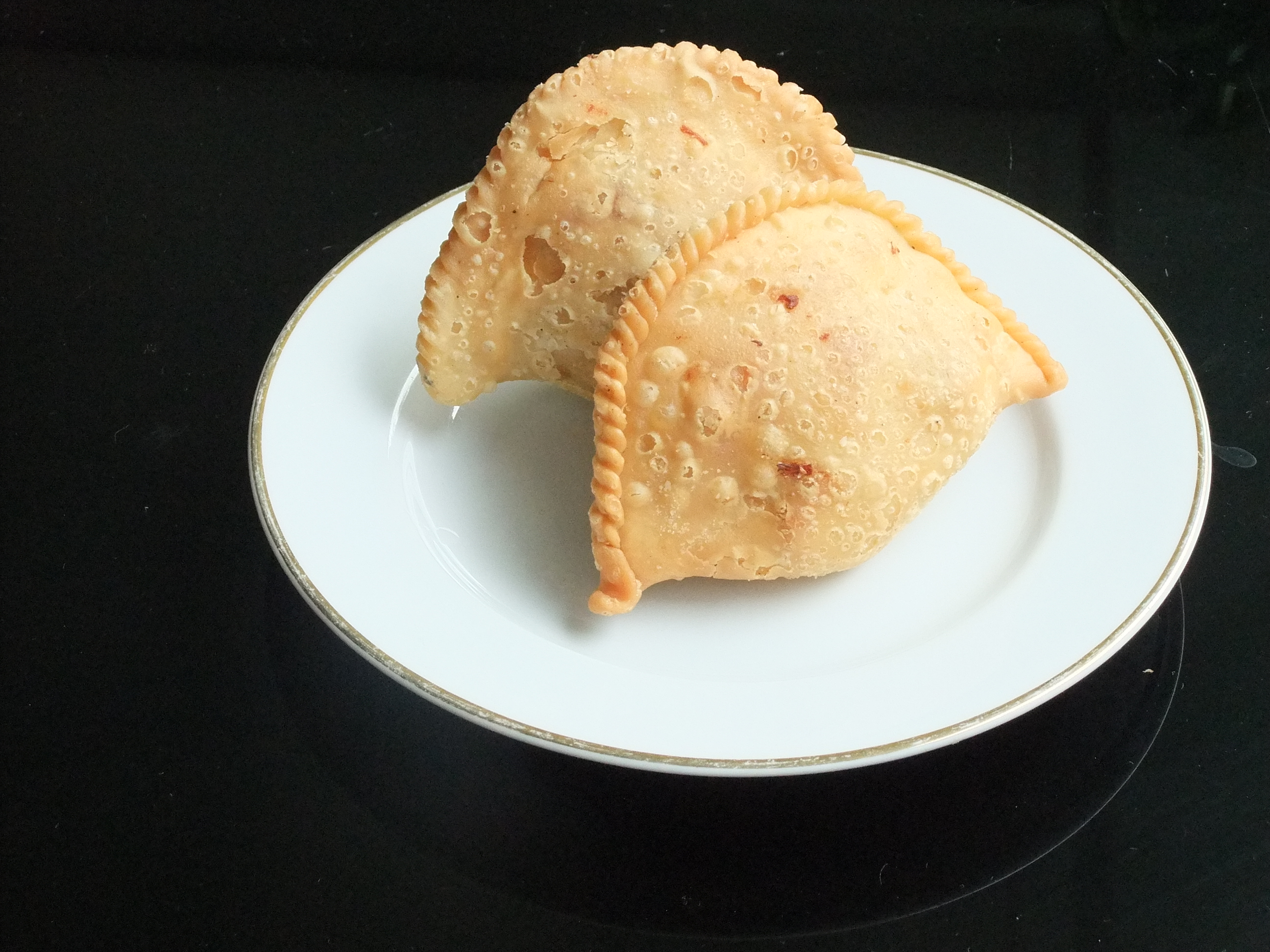
Kue pastel

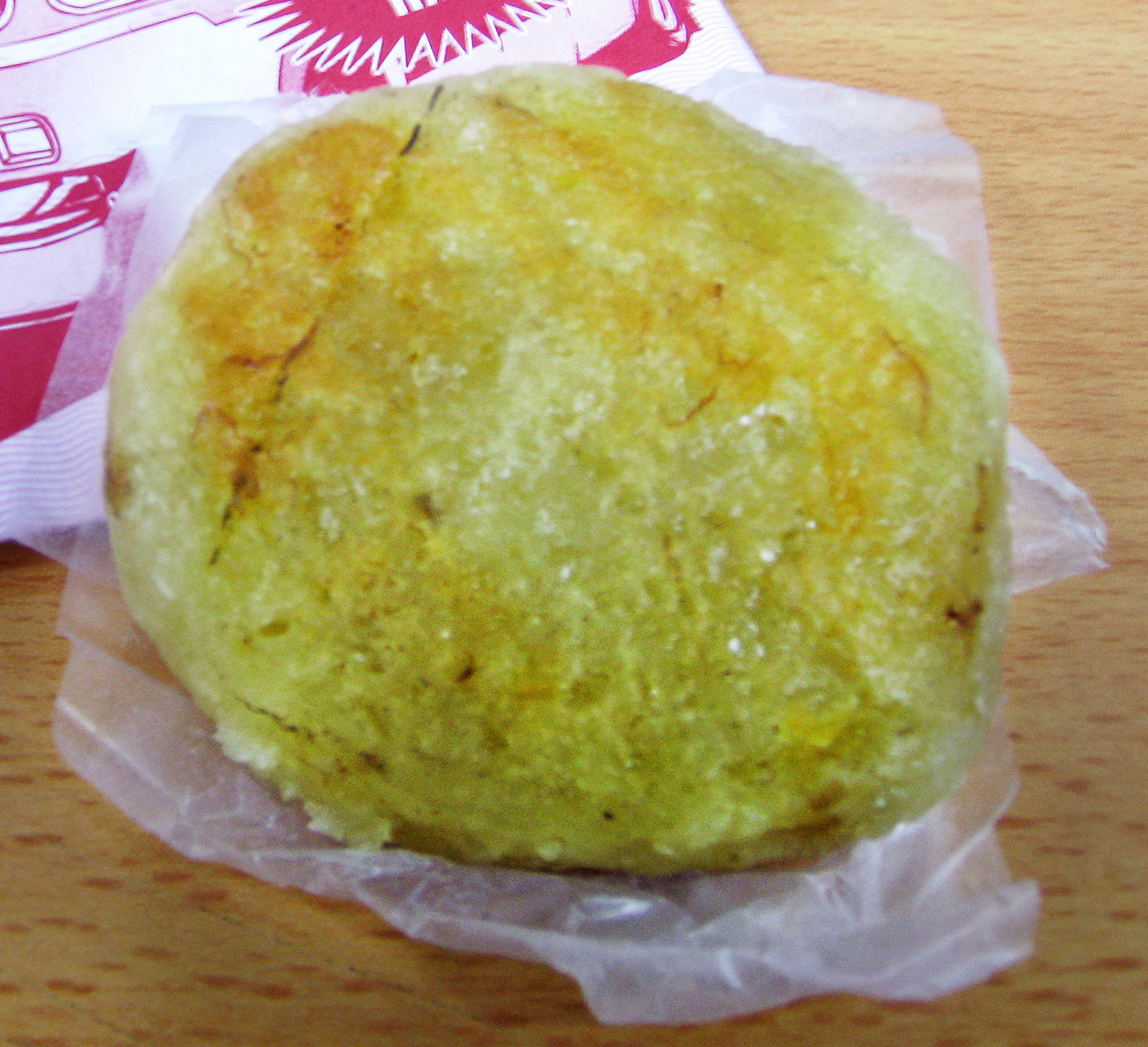
Kue wingko babad

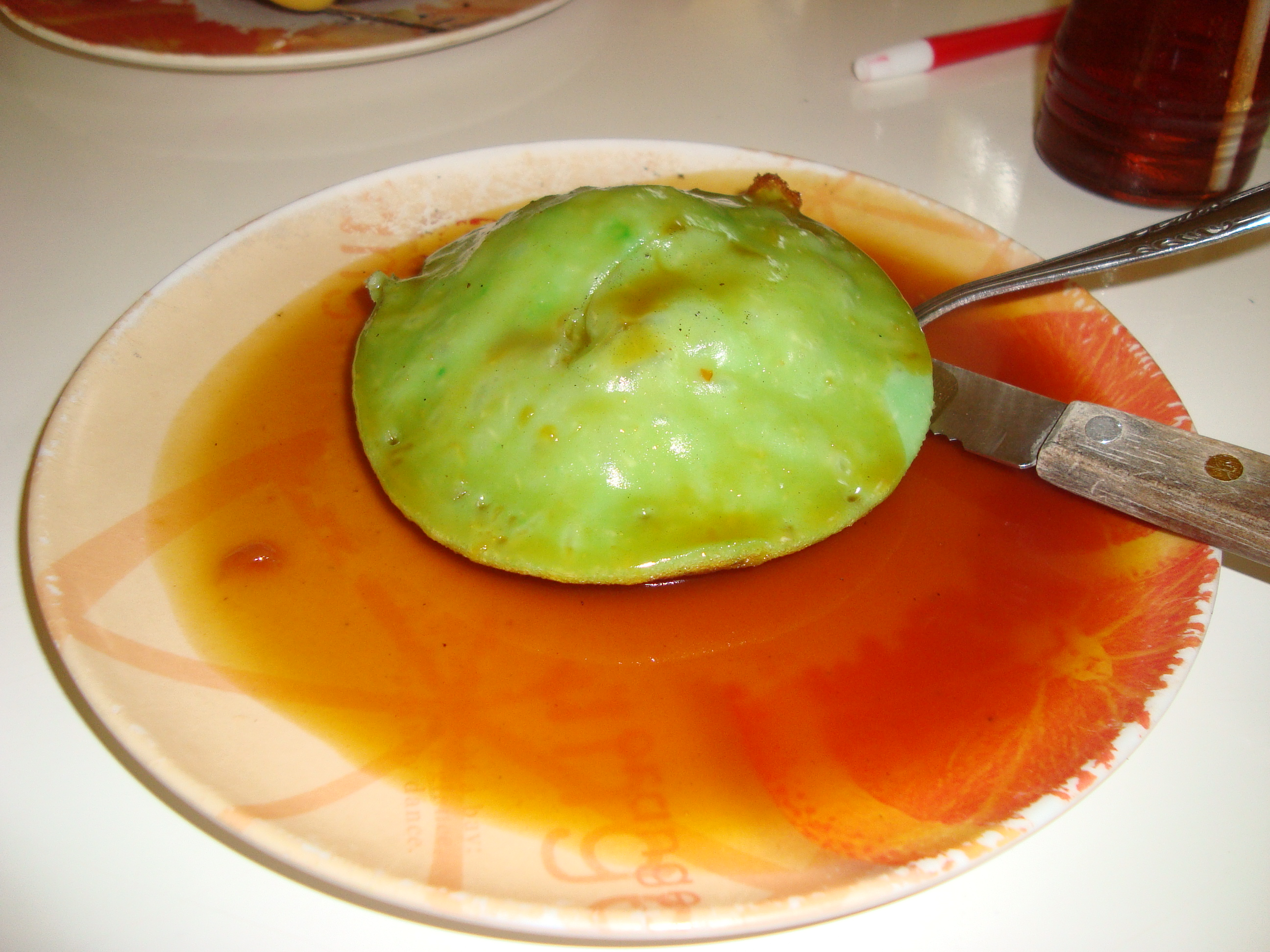
Serabi

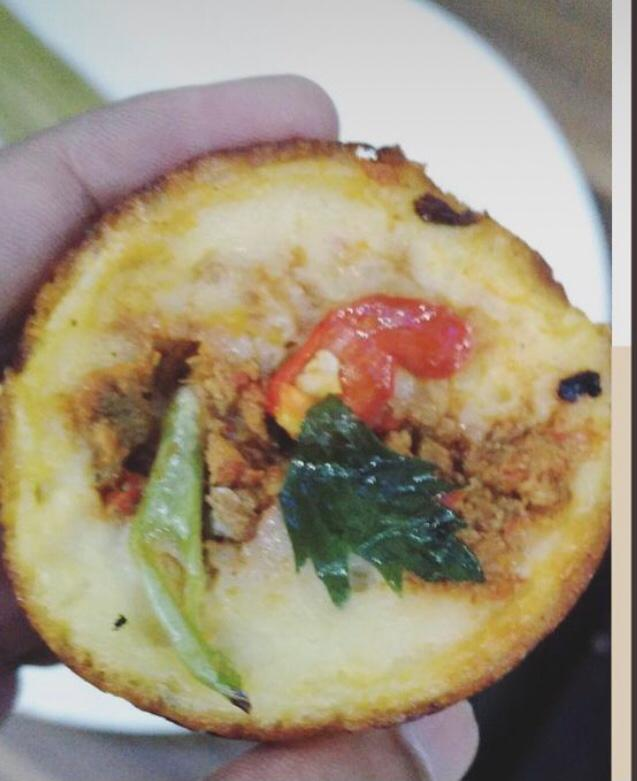
Kue cara

== See also ==
- Cucur
- Dodol
- Ketupat
- Kuih
- Lemang
- List of steamed foods
- List of Indonesian snacks
