= List of Indonesian snacks =

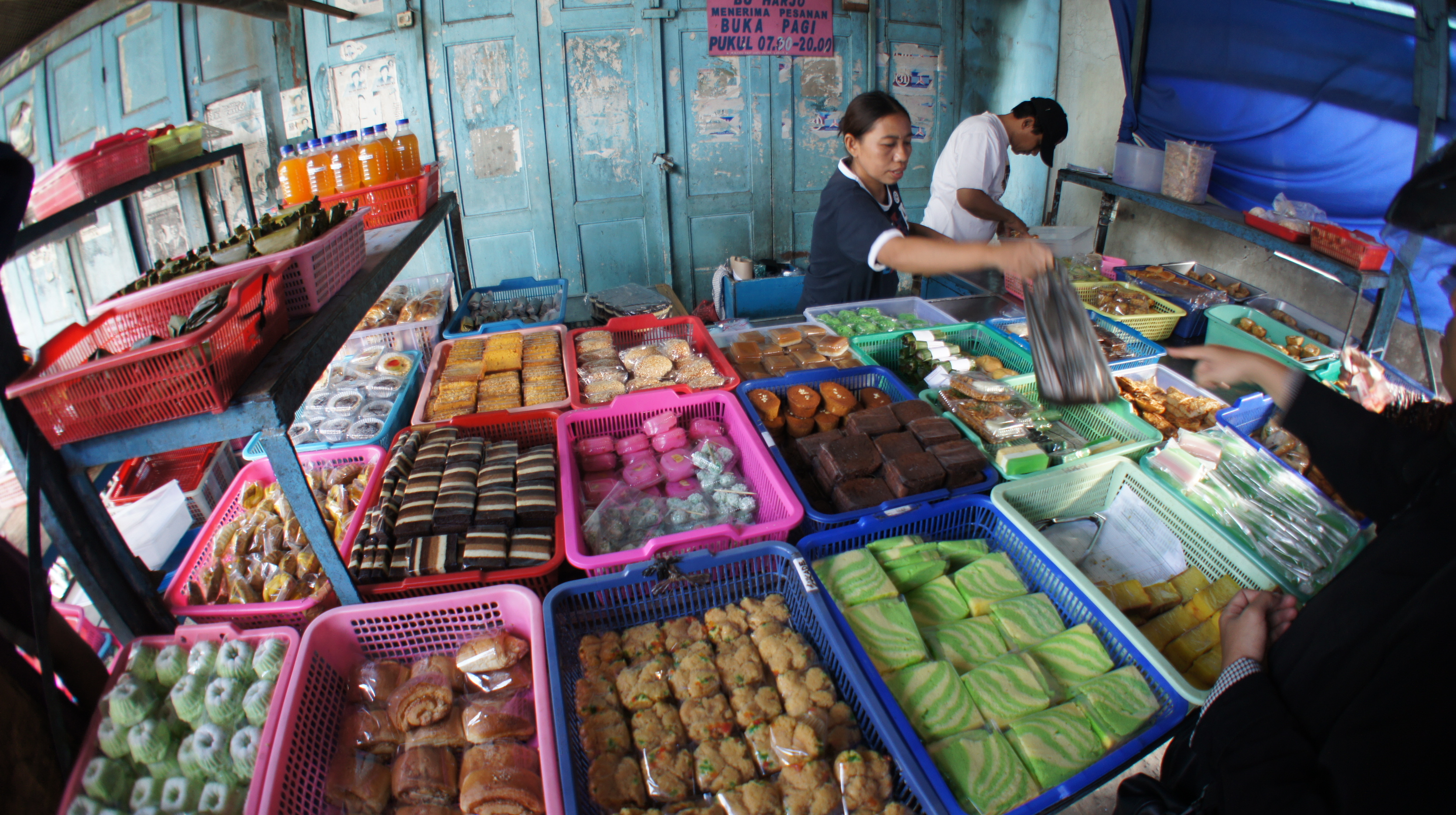
Variation of Indonesian kue basah snack foods offered as jajan pasar ("market buys") at a traditional market in Yogyakarta.

This is a list of Indonesian snacks. In Indonesian, snacks are called kudapan, makanan kecil (lit. "small food") or makanan ringan (lit. "light food"). They might taste savoury or sweet, snack foods are a significant aspect of Indonesian cuisine which is very diverse. Traditional kue snacks — a collection of steamed or fried snacks with rice-flour and coconut sugar-based ingredients, exist in many forms. While traditional crackers of krupuk and kripik chips were also a popular crispy choice.

== Crackers, chips and crisps ==
Name	Image	Region/Popularity	Description
Amplang		Java and Kalimantan	Savoury fish cracker snack, made from wahoo or any type of Spanish mackerel.
Ampo		Central Java and East Java	A snack made by soil. The snack consists of pure clay, without any mixture of ingredients.
Emping		Nationwide	Crackers made from flattened Gnemon/Belinjo seeds.
Intip		Java	Similar to rengginang but larger. A traditional thick scorched rice cracker, made from cooked rice that stuck in the inner part of rice pot, seasoned with salt.
Kemplang		Malay and Palembangese	Savoury fish cracker snack, made from wahoo or any type of Spanish mackerel. This dish is similar to amplang.
Keripik		Nationwide	A traditional chips or crisps, bite-size snack crackers that can be savoury or sweet.
Keripik pisang		Nationwide	Crispy banana chips.
Keripik teripang		Surabaya, Gresik, and Lamongan in East Java	A traditional chips or crisps made of dried sea cucumber.
Kerupuk		Nationwide	Deep fried crisps made from mainly tapioca flour, with added ingredients, such as prawn, fish, or garlic, and even ox/cow skin. It comes in different shapes and colours.
Kerupuk kulit babi		Chinese Indonesian and Balinese	Pork skin crackers.
Kerupuk kulit sapi or kerbau		Nationwide	Cow or buffalo skin crackers.
Kerupuk ikan		Nationwide	A deep fried snack made from starch and fish.
Kerupuk udang		Nationwide	A deep fried snack made from starch and prawn.
Rempeyek		Nationwide, but especially Javanese	A deep-fried savoury Javanese cracker, made from flour with other ingredients, bound or coated by crispy flour batter.
Rengginang		Nationwide	A traditional thick rice cracker, made from cooked glutinous sticky rice and seasoned with spices. This dish made into a flat and rounded-shape.

== Fritters ==
Name	Image	Region/Popularity	Description
Bakwan		Nationwide	A traditional fritter consisting of vegetables and batter. The ingredients are vegetables; usually beansprouts, shredded cabbages and carrots, battered and deep fried in cooking oil.
Cakwe		Java	A long golden-brown deep-fried strip of dough and commonly chopped or thinly sliced and then eaten for breakfast with bubur ayam.
Cimol		Bandung, West Java	A small snack made from rounded tapioca flour doughs which are then fried. Cimol comes from Bandung, West Java.
Cireng		West Java	A small snack made out of fried tapioca batter
Combro		Sundanese	A fritter made from grated cassava with round or oval-shape. This dish is filled of oncom and chilli.
Jemput-jemput		Malay	A traditional Malay fritter snack made from flour before frying. It is usually round in shape and tends to vary in size.
Mendoan		Central Java	Deep fried battered tempeh, cooked lightly in a short time resulting in a limp texture.
Perkedel		Nationwide	Made of ground potatoes, minced meat, peeled and ground corn or tofu, or minced fish. Most common perkedel are made from mashed potatoes, yet there are other popular variants which includes perkedel jagung.
Perkedel jagung		Nationwide	Corn fritters.
Perkedel tahu		Nationwide	Dutch-Indonesian food based on tofu and inspired by frikadeller.
Pisang cokelat		Java	A savoury snack made of slices of banana with melted chocolate or chocolate syrup, wrapped inside thin crepe-like pastry skin and being deep fried.
Pisang goreng		Nationwide	A battered and deep-fried banana or plantain.
Pisang molen		Nationwide	Banana wrapped around in tape-shaped thin pastry dough prior to frying, creating crunchy textures of pastry skin, while the banana inside remains moist and soft.

== Dumplings ==
Name	Image	Region/Popularity	Description
Arem-arem		Java	Similar to lontong, but flavoured with coconut milk, and stuffed with cooked ground meat, or tofu and tempeh.
Bakcang		Chinese Indonesian	Rice cake filled with meats, sometimes beans, mushroom, and salty egg, wrapped in bamboo leaves.
Chai kue		West Kalimantan	A traditional dumpling that must be steamed before served. Filled of yam, taro, or chives. This food is similar to croquette and pastel.
Cilok		Bandung, West Java	Ball-shaped dumpling made from aci (tapioca starch), cilok is an abbreviation of aci dicolok or "poked tapioca", served with peanut sauce, kecap manis (sweet soy sauce), sambal, bottled chili sauce, or served in soup.
Jalangkote		Makassarese	Fried pastry with an empanada-shape and stuffed with vegetables, potatoes and eggs. Spicy, sweet and sour sauce will be dipped into prior to be eaten.
Nyonya chang		Peranakan	A type of zongzi that filled of minced pork with candied winter melon, ground roasted peanuts, and a spice mix.
Lemper		Java	A traditional rice cake, made from glutinous rice and filled usually with chicken.
Lepet		Javanese, Malay, and Sundanese	Sticky rice dumpling mixed with peanuts cooked with coconut milk packed inside janur (young coconut leaf or palm leaf). It is similar to lontong, but with stickier texture and richer flavour acquired from coconut milk and peanuts.
Otak-otak		Nationwide	Usually made from Spanish mackarel fish paste or Milkfish, spiced and wrapped in banana leaves, then grilled and served with peanut sauce.
Pai ti		Peranakan and Malay	A thin and crispy pastry tart shell filled with a spicy, sweet mixture of thinly sliced vegetables and prawns.
Pangsit basah		Chinese Indonesian	Wonton served in gravy with noodle or other gravy-dishes.
Pangsit goreng		Chinese Indonesian	Fried wonton filled with chicken or shrimp with sweet and sour sauce.
Pastel		Nationwide	Fried flour dumpling filled with vegetables and meat.
Semar mendem		Java	A variant snack almost identical to lemper that made of glutinous rice filled with shredded seasoned chicken. Instead of banana leaf wrapping, semar mendem uses a thin omelette as wrapper, hence rendering the whole package edible.

== Savoury snacks ==
Name	Image	Region/Popularity	Description
Asinan		Java	A pickled (through brined or vinegared) vegetable or fruit dish.
Bakmi		Nationwide	Bakmi is normally boiled for serving. When bakmi is intended for use in soup, it is usually boiled separately from the broth. The noodles are usually mixed with either pork fat, chicken fat or beef fat.
Bakso bakar		Nationwide	Grilled and skewered bakso, prepared in a similar fashion to satay.
Bakso goreng		Java	Fried bakso with a rather hard texture, usually consumed solely as a snack.
Batagor		West Java	Batagor is actually an abbreviation of bakso tahu goreng (which literally means fried tofu and meatballs), it's a variant of the siomay in which the siomay was deep-fried.
Belalang goreng		Central Java, Yogyakarta, and East Java	Fried grasshopper.
Be urutan		Bali	A Balinese traditional pork (mostly) sausage.
Bitterballen		Nationwide	A meat-based snack with round-shape, almost similar to kroket.
Burgo		Palembang, South Sumatra	A folded rice pancake served in savoury whitish coconut milk-based soup.
Kerak telor		Jakarta	It is made from chicken or duck egg made into omelette which is mixed with glutinous rice and spice, it is served with coconut granules.
Kroket		Nationwide	A type of croquette, made of mashed potato filled with minced chicken.
Laksa		Nationwide	A spicy noodle soup derived from Peranakan cuisine which has various types. It consists of thick wheat noodles or rice vermicelli with chicken, prawn or fish, served in spicy soup based on either rich and spicy curry coconut milk or on sour asam.
Laksan		Palembangese	Dish made from sago and fish. This dish made in an oval shape with almost pempek flavor, but served with coconut milk sauce.
Lumpia		Nationwide	A spring roll, made of thin paper-like or crepe-like pastry skin called "lumpia wrapper" enveloping savory or sweet fillings. It is often served as an appetizer or snack, and might be served deep fried or fresh (unfried).
Lumpia basah		Java	Unfried lumpia spring roll, served with sweet tauco sauce.
Lumpia semarang		Semarang, Central Java	Semarang style spring roll, made mainly from cooked bamboo shoots and chicken/prawn. Sometimes boiled quail egg is added. It is eaten with a dipping sauce made from coconut sugar, vinegar and garlic.
Maamoul		Arab Indonesian	Filled pastry or cookie made with dates, nuts such as pistachios or walnuts and occasionally almonds, or figs.
Makaroni schotel		Nationwide	A type of macaroni casserole that usually made with cheese, potato and meat (smoked beef, sausage or tuna).
Martabak		Nationwide	Indonesian's version of Murtabak, sometimes filled with beef and scallions, or shreds of peanut and chocolate.
Martabak aceh		Acehnese	A type of Indonesian martabak, that shaped like roti canai and served with curries.
Martabak kubang		West Sumatra	Minangkabau-style of Indonesian martabak. It is Arab–Indian–Minangkabau fusion dish.
Martabak mi		Nationwide	Noodles mixed with eggs then fried, shaped like martabak generally.
Ngo hiang		Chinese Indonesian	A deep-fried dish that consisting of vegetables with meat or shrimp seasoned with five-spice powder in a thin egg crêpe.
Orak-arik tempe		Java	Dry tempeh with more soft and moist texture, also sweet taste. The sweet taste is due to generous addition of kecap manis (sweet soy sauce).
Pastel tutup		Nationwide	A type of shepherd's pie that made with chicken and several vegetables.
Popiah		Chinese Indonesian	A spring roll with Chinese origin and Fujian-style. This dish almost equal to lumpia.
Risoles		Nationwide	Fried rolls with breadcrumbs filled with vegetables and meat.
Samosa		Nationwide	It is a fried or baked dish with a savoury filling, such as spiced potatoes, onions, peas, or lentils.
Seblak		Bandung, West Java	A savoury and spicy dish made of wet krupuk (traditional Indonesian crackers) cooked with scrambled egg, vegetables, and other protein sources; either chicken, seafood, or slices of beef sausages, stir-fried with spicy sauces including garlic, shallot, sweet soy sauce, and chili sauce.
Siomay		Sundanese and Chinese Indonesian	A light meal which has a similar form to Chinese Dim Sum, shaped like ice cream cone except the bottom is flat and made traditionally from mackerel fish meat served with peanut sauce, sometimes added with key lime and/or soy sauce.
Sosis solo		Javanese	A Javanese sausages made from beef or chicken and coated by egg.
Sotong pangkong		Pontianak, West Kalimantan	Dried squid food that burned using charcoal. Usually served during Ramadan.
Sumpia		Nationwide	Much smaller and drier lumpia with similar beef or prawn floss filling

== Tofu-based snacks ==
Name	Image	Region/Popularity	Description
Kembang tahu		Chinese Indonesian	Soft tofu with warm sweet ginger soup.
Tahu aci		Tegal, Central Java	A small snack made from tofu and flour. Its come from Tegal, Central Java.
Tahu goreng		Nationwide	Deep fried tofu.
Tahu gejrot		Cirebon, West Java	Deep fried tofu, served with a sauce made from coconut sugar, sweet soy sauce/kecap manis, chili, garlic and shallot.
Tahu campur		Surabaya and Lamongan, East Java	Sliced fried tofu, rice cakes, potato patty, bean sprouts, lettuce, noodles, and krupuk crackers, served in savoury beef stew.
Tahu gunting		Surabaya, East Java	Deep fried tofu cut with scissors, served with a sauce made from rice flour, peanuts and chili.
Tahu isi		Nationwide	Deef fried tofu filled with vegetables such as bean sprouts and julienned carrot, and sometimes a few minced meat.
Tahu sumedang		Sumedang, West Java	Deep fried tofu, served with sweet soy sauce/kecap manis and chili.
Tahu tauco		Nationwide	Tofu in tauco sauce.
Tahu tek		Lamongan, East Java	Deep fried tofu served with julienned vegetables and peanut, soy sauce and petis sauce. The tahu tek variant with egg addition is called tahu telur.
Tahu telur		Surabaya, East Java	Deep fried tofu and egg, served with julienned vegetables and peanut, soy sauce and petis sauce
Tauge goreng		Bogor, West Java	A savoury vegetarian dish made of stir fried tauge (bean sprouts) with slices of tofu, ketupat rice cake and yellow noodle, served in spicy oncom-based sauce.

== Kue basah or traditional cakes ==
Name	Image	Region/Popularity	Description
Agar-agar		Nationwide	Puddings flavoured jellies like almond tofu, as well as fruit aspics.
Apem		Nationwide, with Indian-influenced	A steamed dough made of rice flour, coconut milk, yeast and palm sugar, usually served with grated coconut.
Bagea		Maluku Islands	A cake made of sago, has a round shape and creamy color. It has a hard consistency that can be softened in tea or water, to make it easier to chew.
Bahulu		Malay	A Malay traditional cake with soft texture. Usually served for breakfast.
Bakpia		Nationwide, but especially in Java	A popular Indonesian bean-filled moon cake-like pastry.
Bakpia pathok		Yogyakarta	A small patty of baked pastry filled with sweet mung bean paste.
Bibingka		Eastern Indonesia	A type of cake made with rice flour, sugar, clarified butter, and coconut milk. Usually served during Christmas.
Bika ambon		Medan, North Sumatra	A type of cake made with as tapioca flour, eggs, sugar, yeast and coconut milk. The yeast creates bubbles, which creates sponge-like holes and gives it a unique spongy texture when it is baked. It is generally sold in pandan and banana flavor, but today it is also available in durian, cheese and chocolate flavour.
Brem (solid snack)		Madiun, East Java	Brem is made from fermented tape. Brem is a special snack from Madiun, East Java. The liquid version is light alcoholic beverage also called Brem originated from Bali.
Clorot		Nationwide, but especially Javanese	Sticky dough of glutinous rice flour sweetened with coconut sugar filled into the cone-shaped janur (young coconut leaf), and steamed until cooked.
Dadar gulung		Javanese, today nationwide	Usually has a green colour, which is acquired from daun suji or pandan leaves It is a green-coloured folded omelette or pancake made of rice flour, filled with grated coconut and palm sugar.
Dodol		Java	Rice flour-based small glutinous sweets, sweetened with coconut sugar, moulded and coloured. Often add fruit scent and taste such as durian.
Geplak		Yogyakarta	Sweets made from sugar and grated coconut.
Idli kukus		Indian Indonesian	A type of Indian-based savoury rice cake, served as breakfast.
Klepon		Nationwide	Boiled rice cake, stuffed with coconut sugar, and rolled in fresh grated coconut. It is flavoured with pandan leaf juice.
Kue bugis		Makassarese, Buginese, and Javanese	A traditional snack of soft glutinous rice flour cake, filled with sweet grated coconuts.
Kue cubit		Nationwide	This cake is called kue cubit because of its small size: To eat it one has to pinch it.
Kue cucur		Nationwide	Pancake made of fried rice, flour batter, and coconut sugar.
Kue kacang tanah		Nationwide	A kind of pastry made from peanuts with various forms, such as round, heart, or crescents.
Kue keranjang		Chinese Indonesian	A food prepared from glutinous rice. Usually served during Chinese New Year.
Kue kochi		Malay, Javanese, and Peranakan	A cake dumpling made from glutinous rice flour, and stuffed with coconut fillings with palm sugar.
Kue ku		Betawi, Javanese, and Chinese Indonesian	A small round or oval shaped Chinese pastry with soft sticky glutinous rice flour skin wrapped around a sweet filling in the centre.
Kue lapis		Nationwide	A traditional snack of colourful layered soft rice flour pudding.
Kue pukis		Nationwide	This cake is made from a mixture of eggs, granulated sugar, flour, yeast and coconut milk. The mixture is then poured into a half-moon mold and baked on fire (not oven). Pukis is quite similar to waffles.
Kue putu		Nationwide	Similar to klepon, except that it's cylindrical in shape while the klepon is spherical.
Kue putu mangkok		Nationwide	A round-shaped, traditional steamed rice flour kue or sweet snack filled with palm sugar. This dish is similar to kue putu.
Kue rangi		Jakarta and West Java	Traditional snack made of grated coconut and starch-based batter and cooked in a special molded pan akin to waffle.
Madumongso		Java	This snack was made from black sticky rice as a basic ingredient. The taste is mixed with sweet because the black rice was previously processed before becoming tapai (through the fermentation process) and cooked to become dodol.
Makmur		Malay	A traditional Malay pastry, made from butter, ghee and flour. Usually served during special occasion of Eid ul-Fitr.
Mochi		Nationwide	Rice flour based cake filled with peanuts paste, sometimes sprinkled with sesame seeds.
Nagasari		Nationwide	Steamed rice cake wrapped in banana leaves, and stuffed with banana.
Onde-onde		Nationwide	Glutinous rice cake balls, filled with sweet green beans paste, and rolled in sesame seed and then fried.
Pai susu		Bali	A type of custard tart that consisting of an outer pastry crust filled with egg custard as well as condensed milk and baked.
Pastel de nata		Jakarta and Timor	An egg tart pastry dusted with cinnamon, derived from Portuguese cuisine.
Poffertjes		Nationwide	Similar to kue cubit. This cake has a light and spongy texture.
Puding sagu		Sumatra and Eastern Indonesia	A sweet pudding made by boiling sago with either water or milk and adding sugar and sometimes additional flavourings.
Putu mayang		Nationwide, but especially Betawi	Made from starch or rice flour shaped like noodles, with a mixture of coconut milk, and served with kinca or liquid javanese sugar.
Kue talam		Nationwide	Two layered coconut milk soft cake made of rice flour, coconut milk and sugar with other additional ingredients; i.e. pandan leaf, palm sugar, yellow or purple yams, etc.
Timphan		Aceh	A steamed banana dumpling that consists of glutinous rice flour, ground banana and coconut milk. It is quite similar to Javanese or Buginese nagasari.
Wingko		Semarang, Central Java	A sweet baked coconut cake. This dish almost similar to bibingka.

== Kue kering or cookies and biscuits ==
Name	Image	Region/Popularity	Description
Kaasstengels		Nationwide	It is made from dough flour, eggs, margarine, and grated cheese. This cake shaped rectangular. Usually served during Eid ul-Fitr, Christmas, and Chinese New Year.
Kembang goyang		Betawi and Javanese	Made of rice flour which is mixed with eggs, sugar, a pinch of salt, and coconut milk. The dough can be fried after heating the oil and the ‘’kembang goyang’’ mold.
Kue gapit		Cirebonese and Javanese	A waffle-cracker snack that grilled between iron molds like a waffle generally.
Kue kaak		Arab Indonesian	A small circular biscuit as result of acculturation between Arabs and Indonesian.
Kue putri salju		Nationwide	A type of cookie which is crescent-shaped and coated with powdered sugar covered like snow.
Kue satu		Java	White-colored traditional cookie with sweet mung beans powder that is crumbled when being bitten.
Kue semprit		Nationwide	A type of cookie made of wheat flour, corn flour, custard powder, sugar and margarine. These ingredients are mixed together to become a dough and then fried.
Kukis jagung		Nationwide	A type of cookie prepared with corn products.
Ladyfinger		Nationwide	A low density, dry, egg-based, sweet sponge biscuits roughly shaped like a large finger.
Lidah kucing		Nationwide	Cat tongue-shaped cookie or biscuit of European origin. Popular snack during Lebaran and Christmas.
Nastar		Nationwide	It has round shape with a diameter of about 2 centimetres. The pineapple jam is filled inside instead of spread on top. The cookie is often decorated with small pieces of cloves or raisins on top of it.
Sale pisang		Java	Bananas which are combed thin and then dried in the sun. After dried in the sun, it can be directly eaten or fried first.
Semprong		Nationwide	A wafer snack made by clasping egg batter using an iron mold which is heated up on a charcoal stove.
Speculaas		Nationwide	A thin, very crunchy, caramelized, and slightly browned cookie, derived from Dutch cuisine.
Stroopwafel		Nationwide	A wafer cookie made from two thin layers of baked dough joined by a caramel filling.
Untir-untir		Java	Dough twist that is fried in peanut oil. It has a shiny and golden look with crispy taste.

== Pastry, bread and cake ==
Name	Image	Region/Popularity	Description
Bakpau		Nationwide	A type of baozi that very typical in Indonesia, filled with chocolate, strawberry, cheese, mung bean, read bean, minced beef, diced chicken, or minced pork.
Bollen		Bandung	Layered pastry filled with sweet fillings, such as banana, cheese and durian.
Bolu beras		Timor	Rice muffin, derived from Portuguese cuisine.
Bolu kukus		Nationwide	Steamed sponge cake.
Bolu pandan		Nationwide	A light, fluffy, green-coloured sponge cake flavoured with the juices of pandan leaves.
Donat jawa		Javanese	A Javanese-style of ring-shaped fritter made from cassava with savoury taste.
Donat kentang		Nationwide	A ring-shaped fritter made from flour and mashed potatoes, coated in powder sugar or icing sugar.
Karipap		Malay	A dumpling snack usually filled with chicken and potato with a dried curry inside.
Klappertaart		Manado, North Sulawesi	Coconut tart or coconut custard of Dutch-Indonesian origin, which is made from flour, sugar, milk, butter, as well as coconut flesh and juice, topped with coconut flesh and raisins.
Kue bulan		Chinese Indonesian and Peranakan	Indonesian traditional mooncake that shaped circular like a moon, white and thinner than regular mooncake.
Kue busa or schuimpje		Nationwide	A sweet pastry made of eggs that are beaten until foamy with fine sugar until stiff. Formed using triangular plastic and baked in the oven.
Kue soes		Nationwide	A baked pastry filled with soft and moist cream made from the mixture of milk, sugar and flour.
Oliebol		Nationwide	Fried dumpling bread or cake, filled with raisins or apple.
Panada		Manado, North Sulawesi	Fried bread filled with spicy tuna.
Roti bakar or roti panggang		Nationwide	Toast that served with jam, chocolate, or cheese, commonly known as street food.
Roti gambang or ganjel rel		Jakarta and Semarang, Central Java	A rectangular shaped brown bread with sesame seeds, flavored with cinnamon and palm sugar. Usually served during Dugderan and Ramadhan.
Roti jala		Malay and Minangkabau	A pretty dish that looks like a lace doily due to the way it is made. Usually served with kari daging kambing.
Roti john		Malay	A Malay omelette sandwich, a European-influenced dish.
Roti tisu		Malay	A thinner version of the traditional roti canai, as thin as a piece of 40–50 cm round-shaped tissue.
Terang bulan		Nationwide	Originally a Chinese snack, but nowadays it is labelled as murtabak.
Terang bulan mini		Nationwide	Smaller version of terang bulan.

== Liquid snacks, porridges and beverages ==
Name	Image	Region/Popularity	Description
Bubur cha cha		Betawi and Malay	A traditional Betawi and Malay dessert, prepared using pearled sago, sweet potatoes, yams, bananas, coconut milk, pandan leaves, sugar and salt. It can be served hot or cold.
Bubur kacang hijau		Nationwide	Green beans porridge, sweetened with sugar, and served with thick coconut milk.
Bubur ketan hitam		Nationwide	Black glutinous rice porridge, sweetened with sugar, and served with thick coconut milk.
Bubur sumsum		Nationwide	White congee made from rice flour and eaten with brown sugar sauce.
Cincau		Nationwide	A jelly-like dessert, made using the Platostoma palustre and has a mild, slightly bitter taste. It is served chilled, with other toppings such as fruit, or in bubble tea or other drinks.
Cendol		Nationwide	Sweet jelly drink, rice flour jelly with green natural coloring from pandan leaf, mixed with coconut milk, shaved ice and palm/brown sugar.
Dadiah		West Sumatra	Traditional West Sumatran water buffalo milk yoghurt.
Dali ni horbo		North Sumatra	A cheese-like traditional dish, with a yellowish white appearance with tofu-like texture and milky flavor. Dali is made by boiling buffalo milk coagulated with papaya leaf or unripe pineapple juice.
Dangke		South Sulawesi	A traditional cheese that made from buffalo or cow milk. This dish is processed by boiling fresh milk with sliced papaya leaves, stems, or unripe papaya fruits. Dangke is typically soaked in a brine solution overnight before being wrapped with banana leaves for masking the bitter taste caused by the addition of papaya leaves.
Es doger		Bandung, West Java	Cold and sweet coconut ice dessert with syrup and various fillings.
Es campur		Nationwide	Shaved ice with coconut pieces, various fruits (usually jackfruit), grass jelly, syrup and condensed milk.
Es teler		Nationwide	A mixed of avocado, young coconut, jack fruit, shredded iced with sweet condensed milk.

== Seeds, beans and peanuts ==
Name	Image	Region/Popularity	Description
Beton or biji nangka rebus		Java and Sumatra	Boiled jackfruit seeds seasoned with salt.
Jagung goreng		Nationwide but more common in East Nusa Tenggara	Crispy deep fried crispy corn kernels, consumed in similar fashion as fried peanuts. The type of corn used is the one that do not explode in the heat like popcorns.
Kacang disko or kacang Bali		Bali	Deep fried peanuts coated with crispy batter and seasoned with flavourings; sugar and salt, a popular accompaniment for beer.
Kacang goreng or kacang bawang		Nationwide	Deep fried peanuts with garlic.
Kacang mede or kacang mete		Nationwide	Deep fried cashew nuts
Kacang tolo or roay		Nationwide	Deep fried peas with salt.
Kuaci		Nationwide	A baked plant seeds, it can be sunflower or pumpkin seeds.
Pilus, kacang pilus, kacang sukro or kacang atom		Nationwide	Pilus is deep fried tapioca balls, while kacang pilus or kacang sukro is peanut coated with tapioca.

== See also ==
- Cuisine of Indonesia
- Kue
- List of Indonesian beverages
- List of Indonesian desserts
- List of Indonesian dishes
- List of Indonesian soups
- List of snack foods
- List of snack foods by country
- Street food of Indonesia
