= Kue pancong =

Indonesian coconut hot cake

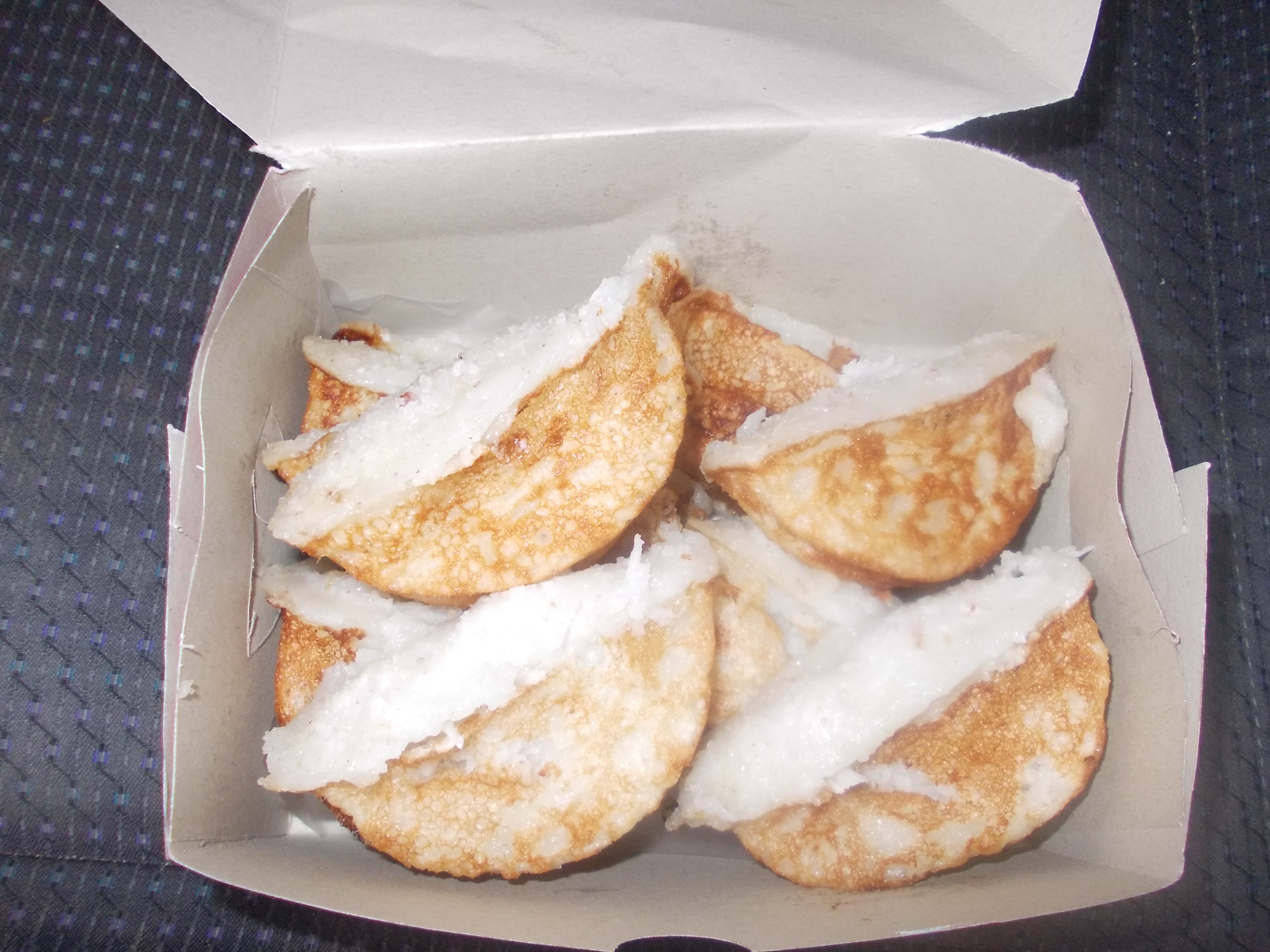
- Freshly baked kue pancong.
- Alternative names: Kue pancung, bandros, gandos
- Type: Baked sweet coconut cake
- Course: Snack
- Place of origin: Indonesia
- Region or state: West Java, Jakarta, Makassar
- Serving temperature: Warm or room temperature
- Main ingredients: Rice flour, eggs, coconut milk, grated coconut, sugar
- Similar dishes: kue pukis, kue rangi

Kue pancong is an Indonesian kue or traditional snack made of a rice flour and coconut-based batter and cooked in a special mold pan. It is a commonly found snack in traditional Indonesian markets. The mold pan is similar to a muffin tin but has rectangular basins instead of rounded ones. It consists of a row of rectangular basins of small tubs with rounded half-moon bottoms, to create half-moon or boat-shaped hot cakes. A pancong mold is quite similar to a waffle mold. The special grill-like metal mold used in making kue pancong is also used in other Indonesian traditional kue, including kue pukis and kue rangi, and so the shape is quite similar to those cakes. Kue pancong is often regarded as the coconut version of wheat-based kue pukis. The texture is chewy and soft, similar to pancake.

== Name ==
The term kue pancong is usually associated with the Betawi cuisine of Jakarta. The same snack (with some variation) is also referred to as kue pancung in parts of central Sumatra, gunjing in South Sumatra, bandros in Sundanese-speaking area, gandos in Javanese-speaking area, and buroncong in Makassar.

== Ingredients and cooking method ==
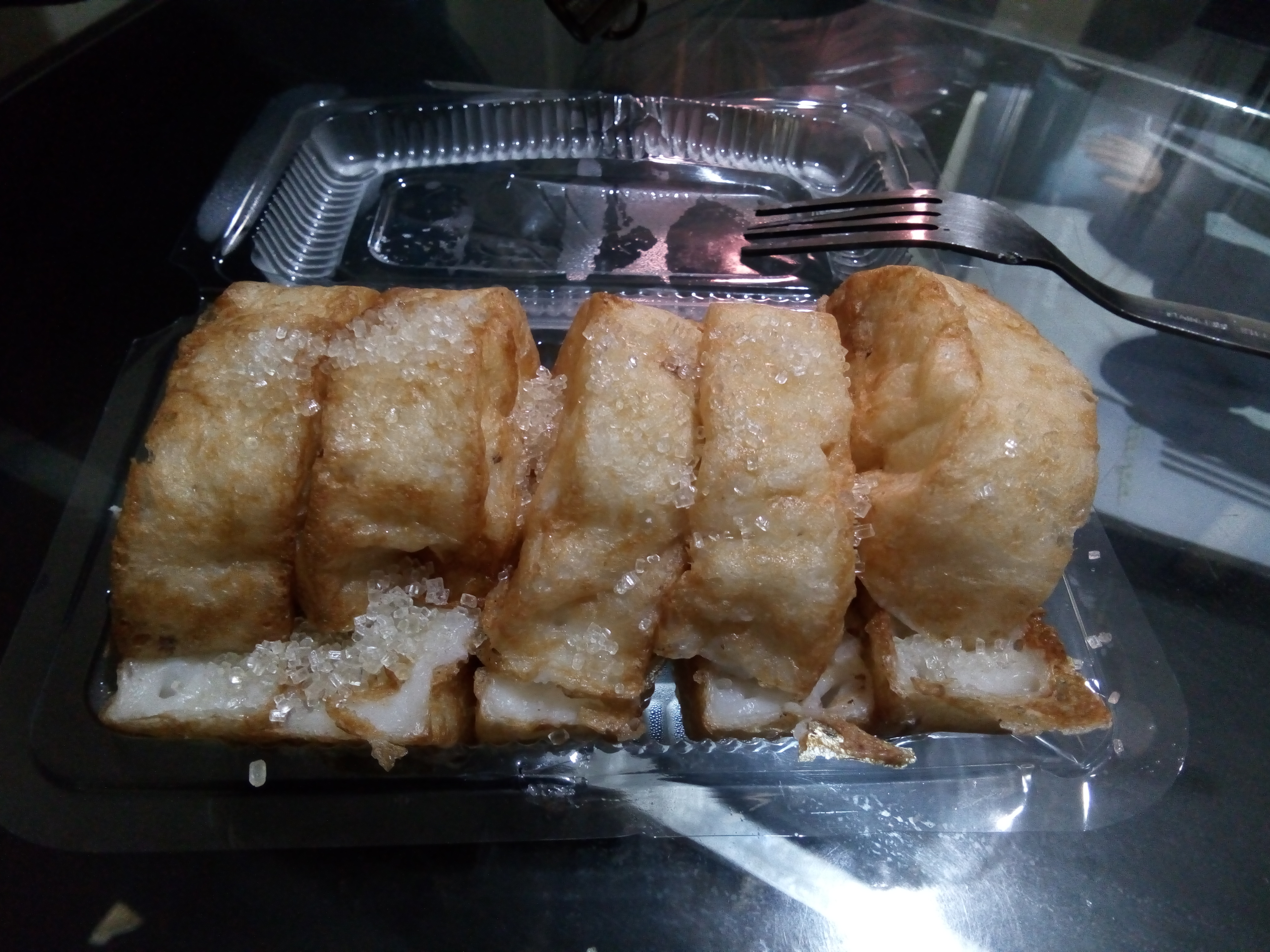
Kue pancong, coconut hotcakes sprinkled with cristal sugar granules.

The batter is made from the mixture of rice flour, grated ripe coconut, granulated crystal sugar, salt, coconut milk, pandan leaves (optional for aroma), water, vegetable oil or margarine to grease the mold pan. Granules of crystal sugar were sprinkled as the topping.

== Summary table ==
Kue pancong, kue pukis and kue rangi are quite similar, this was mainly owed to the similar mold pan being used, thus the three hot cakes are often mistakenly identified. The general differences between those three hot cakes are as follows:

Ingredients	Rangi	Pancong	Pukis
Image			
Flour used in batter	tapioca starch	rice flour	wheat flour
Grated coconut	Used	Used	Not used
Coconut milk	Not used	Used	Used
Egg	Not used	Used	Used
Yeast	Not used	Not used	Used
Mold pan basin	small, shallow	medium, deep	medium, deep
Topping	liquid brown sugar	sugar granules	chocolate sprinkles
Texture	dry and chewy	soft and moist	mostly soft

== See also ==
- Kue cubit
- Kue putu
- Serabi
- Kue ape
- Dorayaki
