= Kue rangi =

Indonesian coconut waffle

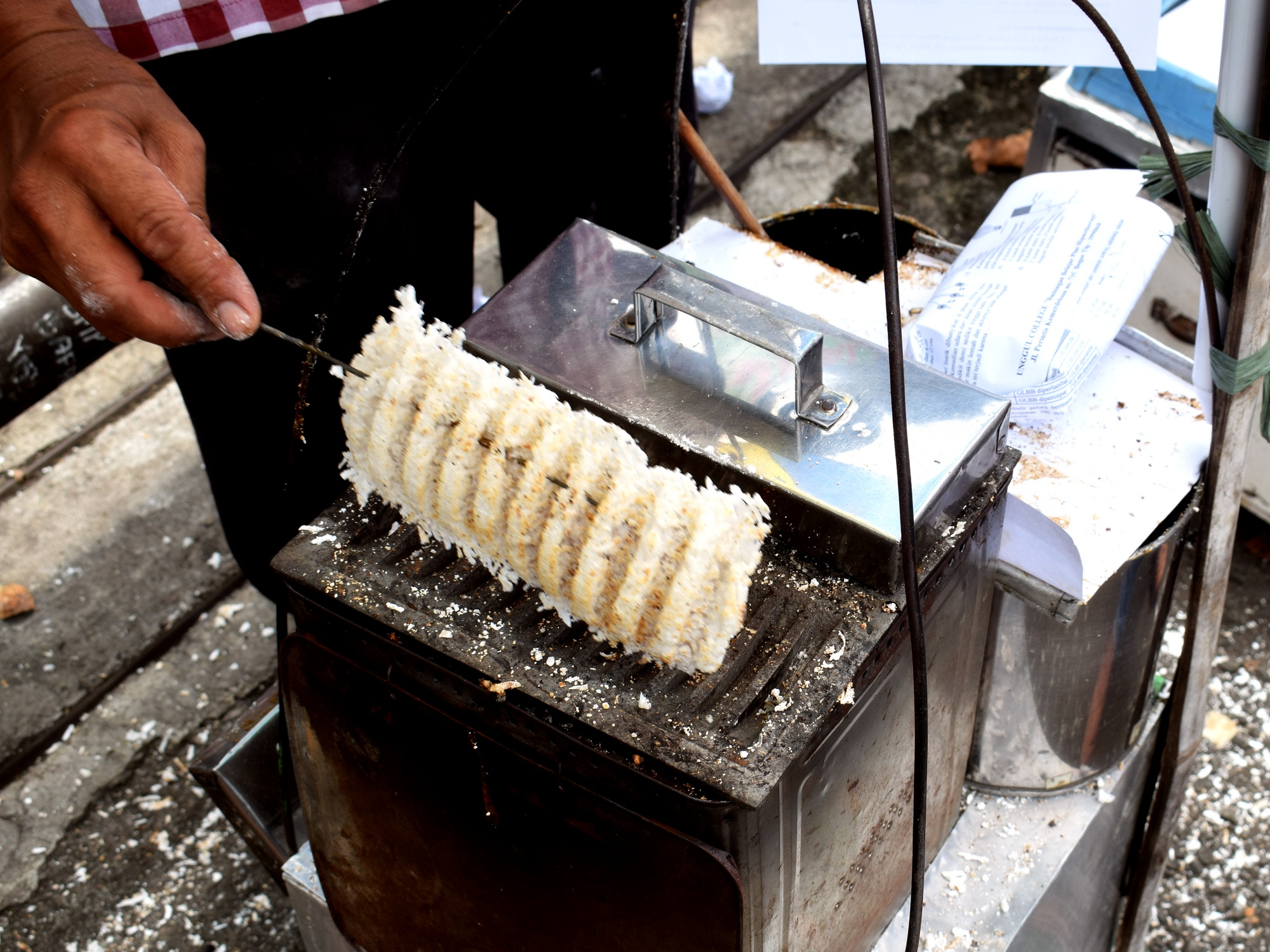
- Freshly baked kue rangi just being pulled up from the special metal mold.
- Alternative names: Sagu rangi
- Type: Baked coconut cake
- Course: Snack
- Place of origin: Indonesia
- Region or state: Jakarta and West Java
- Serving temperature: Warm or room temperature
- Main ingredients: tapioca starch, grated coconut, palm sugar,
- Similar dishes: kue pancong, kue pukis

Kue rangi or also called sagu rangi is an Indonesian coconut kue or traditional snack made of a coconut and starch-based batter and cooked in a special molded pan. It is one of the traditional Betawi snack of Jakarta. Kue rangi is often described as Indonesian coconut waffle.

The mold pan is similar to muffin tin but has rectangular basins instead of rounded. It took form of a row of rectangular basins of small tubs with a rounded half-moon bottom, thus create a half-moon or boat-shaped cake. The special grill-like metal mold used in making kue rangi is also used in other Indonesian traditional kue; including kue pancong (also known as bandros in West Java) and kue pukis (which is made with wheat flour batter instead). However, compared to kue pukis, kue rangi's mold pan has a smaller basin tubs holes, and the cake is left stuck together, thus made its shape akin to waffle.

== Ingredients and cooking method ==
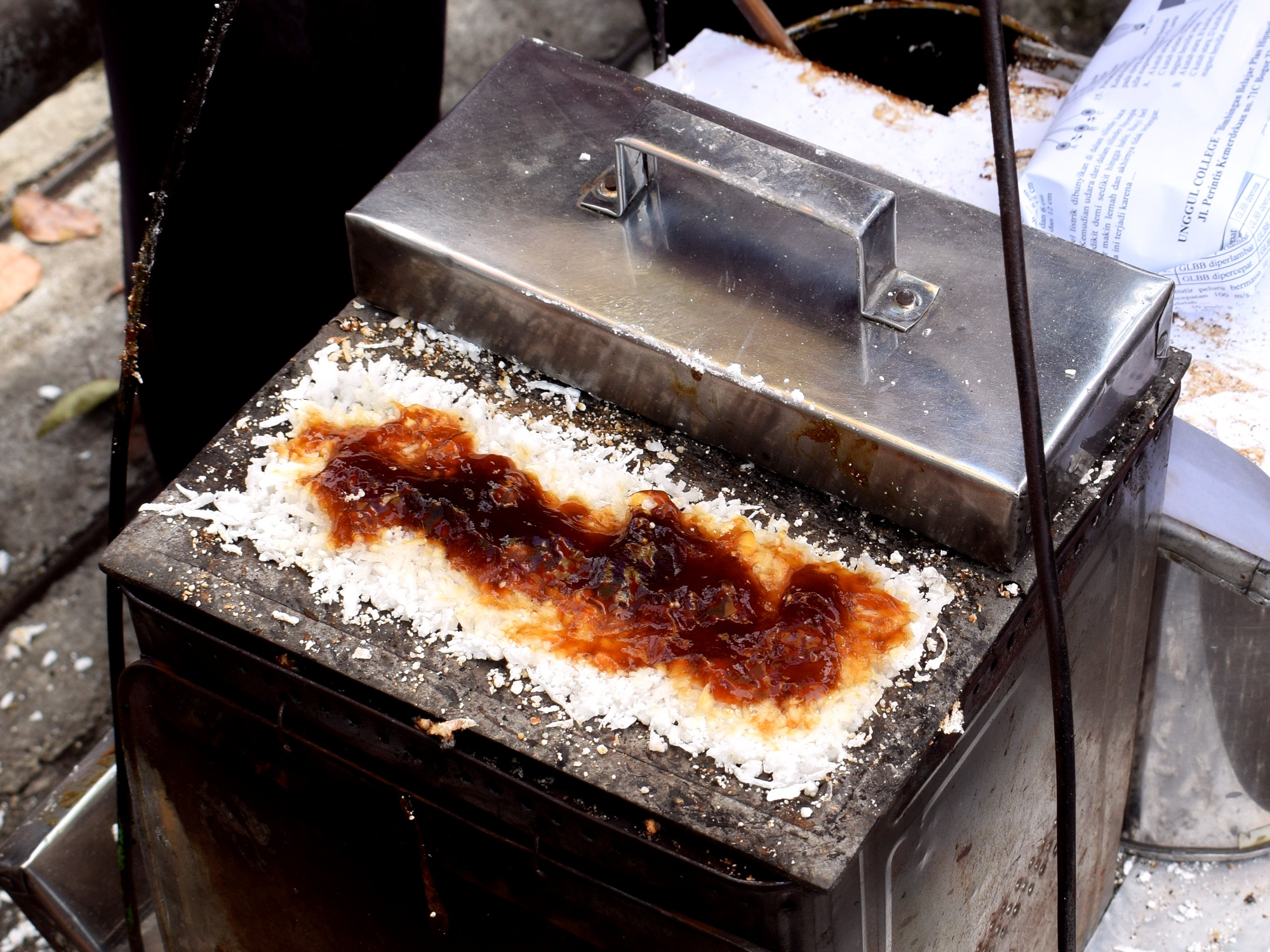
Kue rangi topped with thick brown sugar.

This cake is made from a mixture of tapioca starch, which is called by Betawi people as sago flour, with grated coconut flesh, salt, mixed with water as a batter and poured upon a special metal mold and baked on a small stove. Compared to similarly shaped coconut kue pancong, kue rangi has a more drier texture.

Kue rangi is served with a spread of liquid brown sugar or coconut sugar sauce thickened with a little starch, thus it has a thick, slightly runny, gelatinized sweet brown sauce. In order to add a pleasant fruity fragrance, this thick liquid sugar is sometimes mixed with pieces of jackfruit, pineapple or a knot of pandan leaf. Traditionally, freshly baked kue rangi usually has a pleasant smoky aroma because it is cooked using wood-fueled stove.

== Summary table ==
Kue rangi, kue pancong and kue pukis are quite similar, thus the three hot cakes are often mistakenly identified. The general differences between those three hot cakes are as follows:

Ingredients	Rangi	Pancong	Pukis
Image			
Flour used in batter	tapioca starch	rice flour	wheat flour
Grated coconut	Used	Used	Not used
Coconut milk	Not used	Used	Used
Egg	Not used	Used	Used
Yeast	Not used	Not used	Used
Mold pan basin	small, shallow	medium, deep	medium, deep
Topping	liquid brown sugar	sugar granules	chocolate sprinkles
Texture	dry and chewy	soft and moist	mostly soft

== See also ==
- Kue cubit
- Kue putu
- Serabi
- Kue ape
- Klepon
