= Kue pukis =

Indonesian hot cake

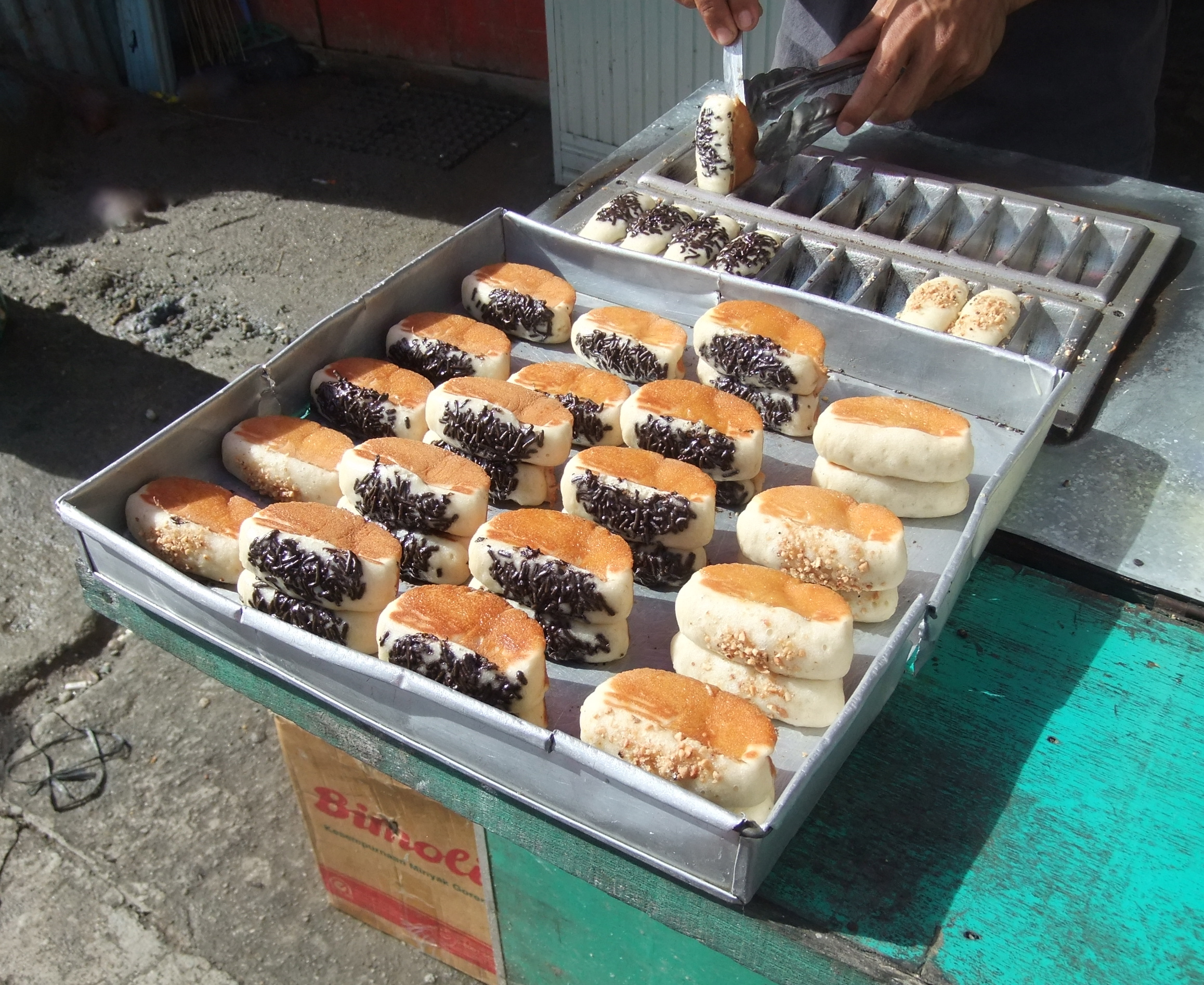
- Freshly baked kue pukis on display.
- Alternative names: Pukis
- Type: Baked sweet wheat cake
- Course: Snack
- Place of origin: Indonesia
- Region or state: Nationwide
- Serving temperature: Warm or room temperature
- Main ingredients: Wheat flour, yeast, eggs, coconut milk, sugar
- Similar dishes: kue pancong, kue rangi

Kue pukis or simply called Pukis is an Indonesian kue or traditional snack made of a wheat flour-based batter and cooked in a special mold pan. It is a commonly found snack in Indonesian traditional markets.

The mold pan is similar to muffin tin but has rectangular basins instead of rounded. It took form of a row of rectangular basins of small tubs with a rounded half-moon bottom, thus create a half-moon or boat-shaped hot cakes. Pukis mold is quite similar to waffle mold. The special grill-like metal mold used in making kue pukis is also used in other Indonesian traditional kue; including kue pancong (also known as bandros in West Java) and kue rangi (which is made with grated coconut and tapioca starch-batter instead), thus the shape is quite similar to those cakes. Although kue pukis mold is usually bigger than kue rangi mold. The taste however, is more akin to Indonesian kue cubit, Dutch poffertjes and Japanese dorayaki, due to similar wheat flour-based batter.

== Ingredients and cooking method ==
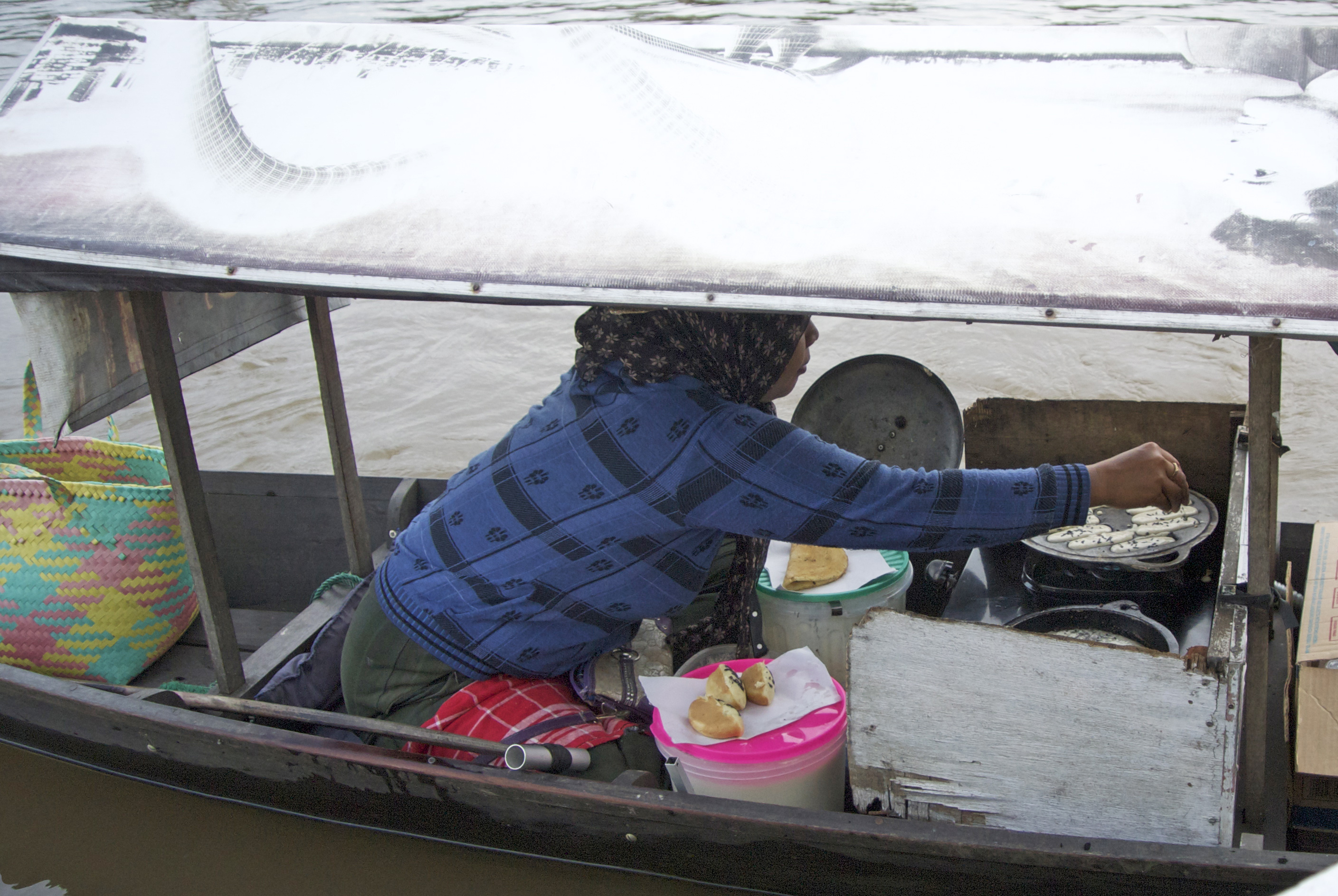
Kue pukis seller on a boat at Lok Baintan floating market in Banjar Regency, South Kalimantan.

The batter is made from the mixture of wheat flour, water, yeast, eggs, sugar, thick coconut milk, and salt; with vegetable oil, butter or margarine used to grease the cake mold to avoid it being stuck.

Sometimes the top of the cake is sprinkled with chocolate sprinkles, bits of peanuts, grated cheddar cheese or fermented cassava tapai.

== Summary table ==
Kue pukis, kue pancong and kue rangi are quite similar, thus the three hot cakes are often mistakenly identified. The general differences between those three hot cakes are as follows:

Ingredients	Rangi	Pancong	Pukis
Image			
Flour used in batter	tapioca starch	rice flour	wheat flour
Grated coconut	Used	Used	Not used
Coconut milk	Not used	Used	Used
Egg	Not used	Used	Used
Yeast	Not used	Not used	Used
Mold pan basin	small, shallow	medium, deep	medium, deep
Topping	liquid brown sugar	sugar granules	hagelslag (chocolate sprinkles) or grated cheese
Texture	dry and chewy	soft and moist	mostly soft

== See also ==
- Kue cubit
- Kue khamir
- Kue putu
- Serabi
- Kue ape
- Dorayaki
