= Kue talam =

Indonesian coconut tray cake

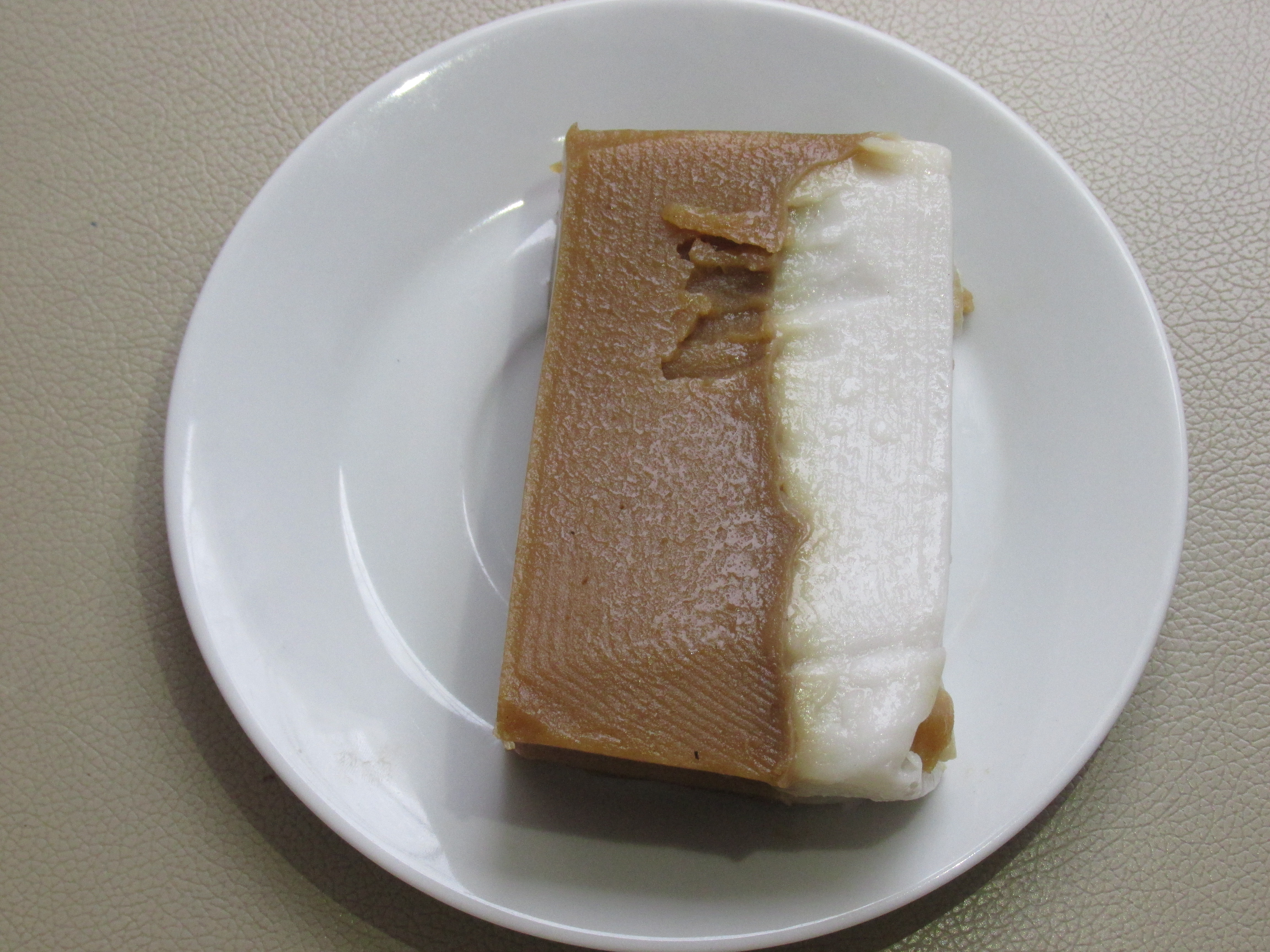
- Minang version of coconut sugar flavoured kuih talam with white-brown colour, cut in rectangular form
- Alternative names: Talam
- Type: Steamed sweet coconut layered cake
- Course: Snack
- Place of origin: Brunei, Indonesia, Malaysia, Myanmar, Singapore, Southern Thailand
- Region or state: Nationwide
- Serving temperature: Room temperature
- Main ingredients: Rice flour, coconut milk, sugar

Kue talam is an Southeast Asia or traditional steamed snack made of a rice flour, coconut milk and other ingredients in a mold pan called talam which means "tray". The cake mold used to create kuih talam are either larger rectangular aluminium tray or smaller singular cups made from ceramics, aluminium, melamine or plastic.

Kue talam and its variations are commonly found in various Southeast Asian regional cuisine traditions; from the Indonesia region, these consist of Betawi, Minang, Malay, Batak, Sundanese, Javanese, Malaysia, Singapore, and Brunei. Kuih talam was introduced by the Sino-Burmese to Lower Myanmar, where it is known as kway talan (ကွေတာလန်း).

Kuih talam usually has two layers; the top one is white made from savoury creamy coconut milk, while the bottom one is coloured according to each variant's recipe. The green pandan flavour, the yellow yam and the brown coconut sugar flavours are the most common one.

== Ingredients ==
The basic ingredients of kue talam are rice flour, coconut milk, granulated sugar, salt, and pandan leaves. Other ingredients might be included to create the lower coloured part.

The top one is white and made simply using more coconut milk, rice flour, sugar and salt, and usually tastes savoury, mild sweet with softer creamy consistency. The bottom one is a little bit firmer and has colours according to added ingredients. The bottom coloured layer are poured first into the mold. After being half cooked being steamed for some times, the white layer is added on top and steamed further.

The mold being used traditionally is rectangular aluminium tray mold, hence the name talam (tray), thus the cake is required to be cut into rectangular or square shape prior of serving. Today however, the singular small cups akin to chawan (Chinese teacup) are often used as mold; either made from ceramics, aluminium, plastic or melamine.

== Variations ==
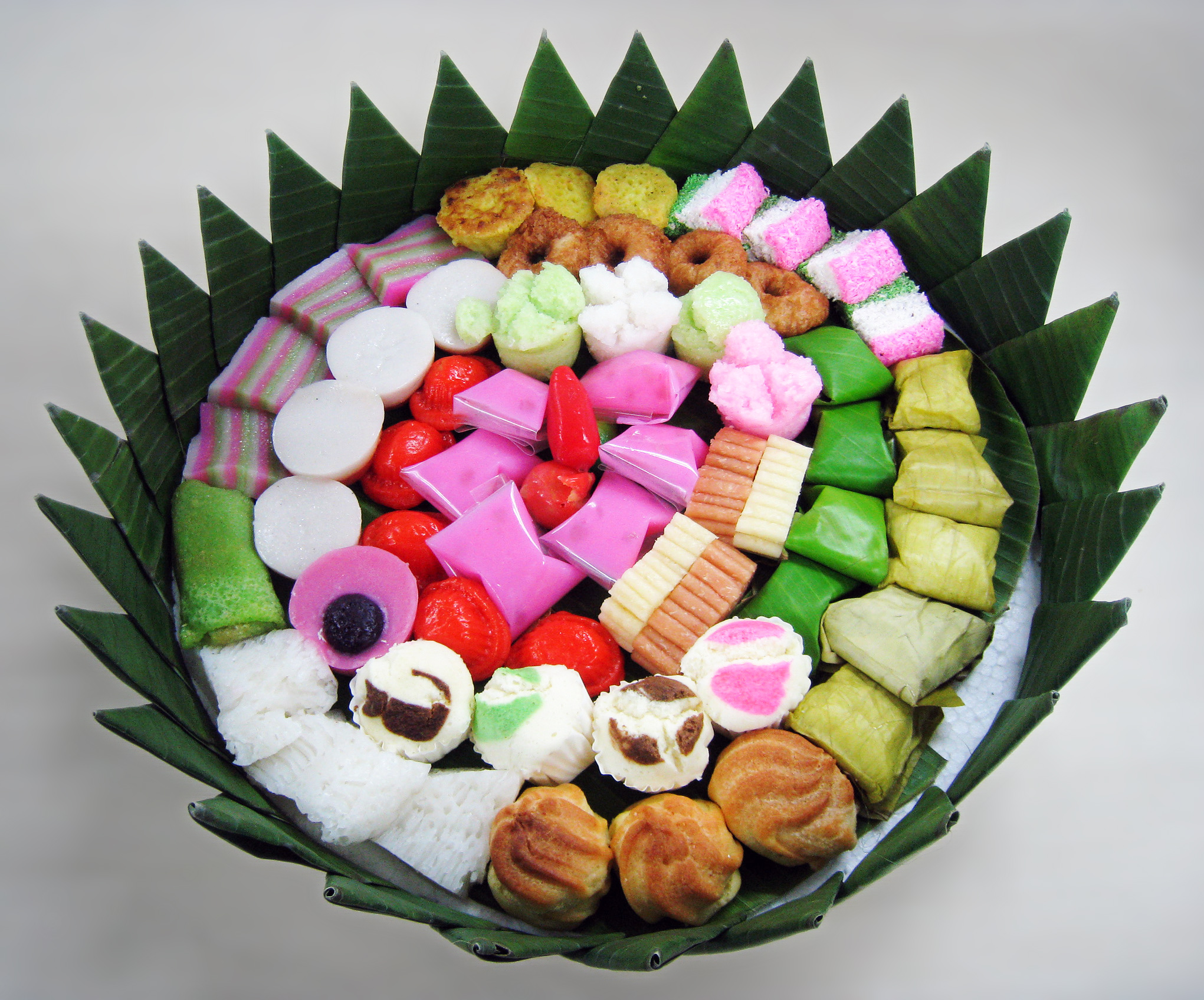
White-yellow kue talam (white rounded top left) as part of jajan pasar assorted kue market snacks in Jakarta.

=== Sweet ===
Kue talam normally tastes sweet and consists of two layers, white top and coloured bottom. Kue talam could be made in various flavours which contributes to the colours of the bottom part, they are:

1. Green: the green bottom kue talam is using suji or the green juice acquired from pandan leaf.
2. Brown: the brown colour is acquired from gula merah or gula jawa (coconut sugar).
3. Yellow: the yellow bottom is acquired from red or yellow sweet potato, pumpkin or corn.
4. Purple: the purple colour is acquired from ubi ungu or purple yam or taro.

=== Savoury ===
Most of kue talam tastes sweet, however there is also a salty and savoury variants that uses ebi or dried shrimp for flavour, which is called talam udang or "shrimp talam" in Betawi cuisine of Jakarta.

== See also ==
- Kue lapis
- Kue pancong
- Nagasari
- Serabi
