= Kue ape =

Indonesian type of pancake

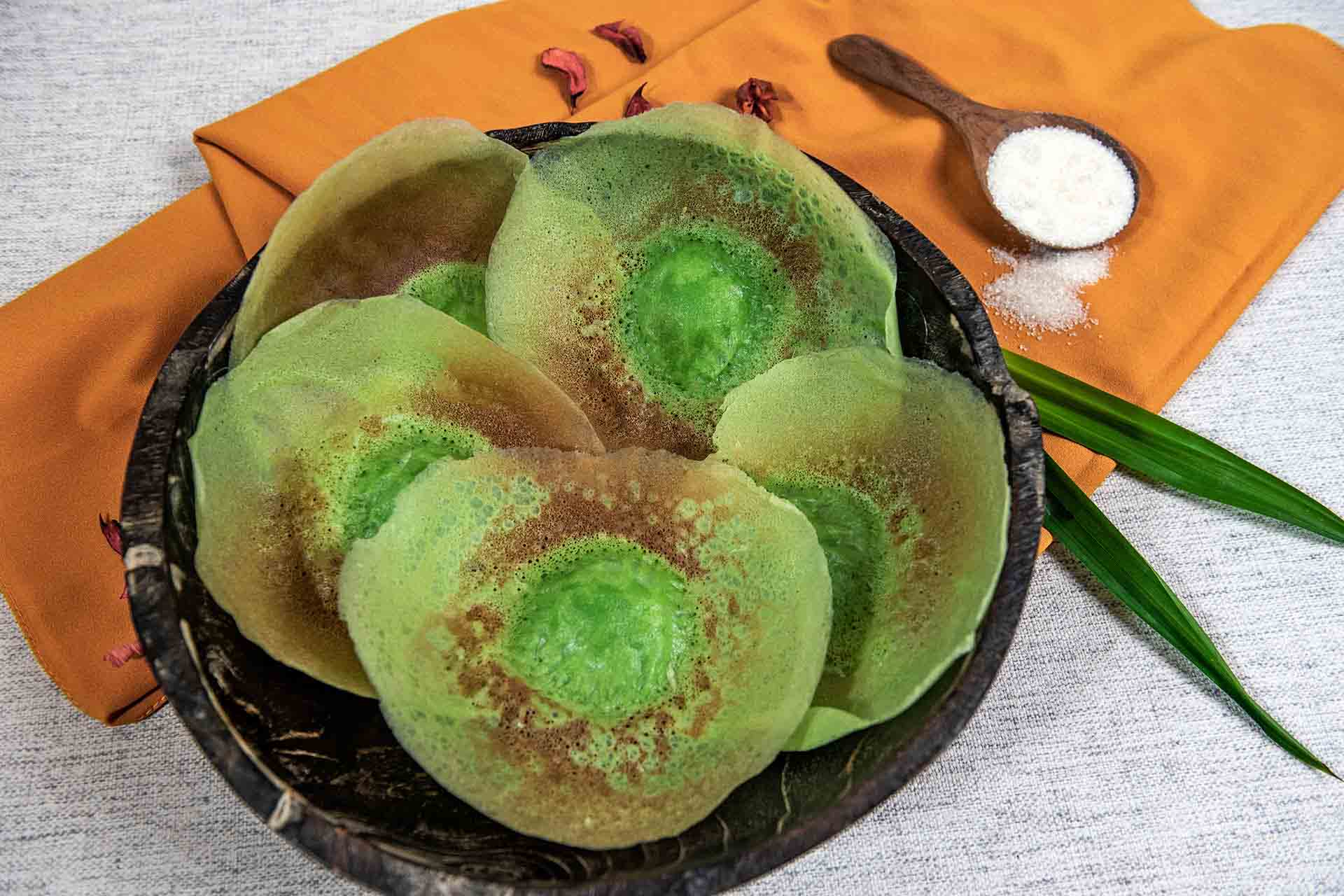
- A traditional Indonesian snack in form of pancakes with a soft and tender green color in the center surrounded with crunchy crepes
- Alternative names: Serabi Jakarta, cucur tipis, kue tete (lit: "boobs cake")
- Type: Kue, pancake
- Course: Snack
- Place of origin: Indonesia
- Region or state: Jakarta, Nationwide
- Serving temperature: Hot, warm or room temperature
- Main ingredients: Rice flour, Flour, sugar, pandan pasta

Kue ape or serabi Jakarta (lit: Jakarta style serabi) is a popular traditional kue pancake with soft and fluffy center surrounded with thin and crispy crepes, commonly found as a popular street food in Indonesia, especially in Jakarta and other major cities. It is also popularly known as kue cucur tipis (lit: thin cucur), which is different from the thicker kue cucur, and colloquially known as kue tetek (breast cake or boobs cake) due to its nipple-like shape. Because it is deemed inappropriate to say ‘tetek’, most Indonesians just say kue ape as in “what cake?”. It is also very similar to serabi Solo.

== Ingredients and cooking method ==
The batter is made of flour, rice flour, sugar, salt, baking powder, vanilla powder, and coconut milk. Sometimes the daun suji (Dracaena angustifolia leaf) is added as a green food coloring. The mixed batter is cooked in a small serabi wok or frying pan, greased with palm oil, margarine or butter. The parabolic shape of small serabi wok would create thick and fluffy center where the batter concentrate, and also creating crispy thinner skin radiating around the cake. Together with kue cubit which also employ similar batter, kue ape is a popular snack among school children and commonly sold in marketplaces.

== See also ==
- Serabi
- Kue cucur
- Kue cubit
