= Khanom krok =

Thai dessert cooked in a mortar pan

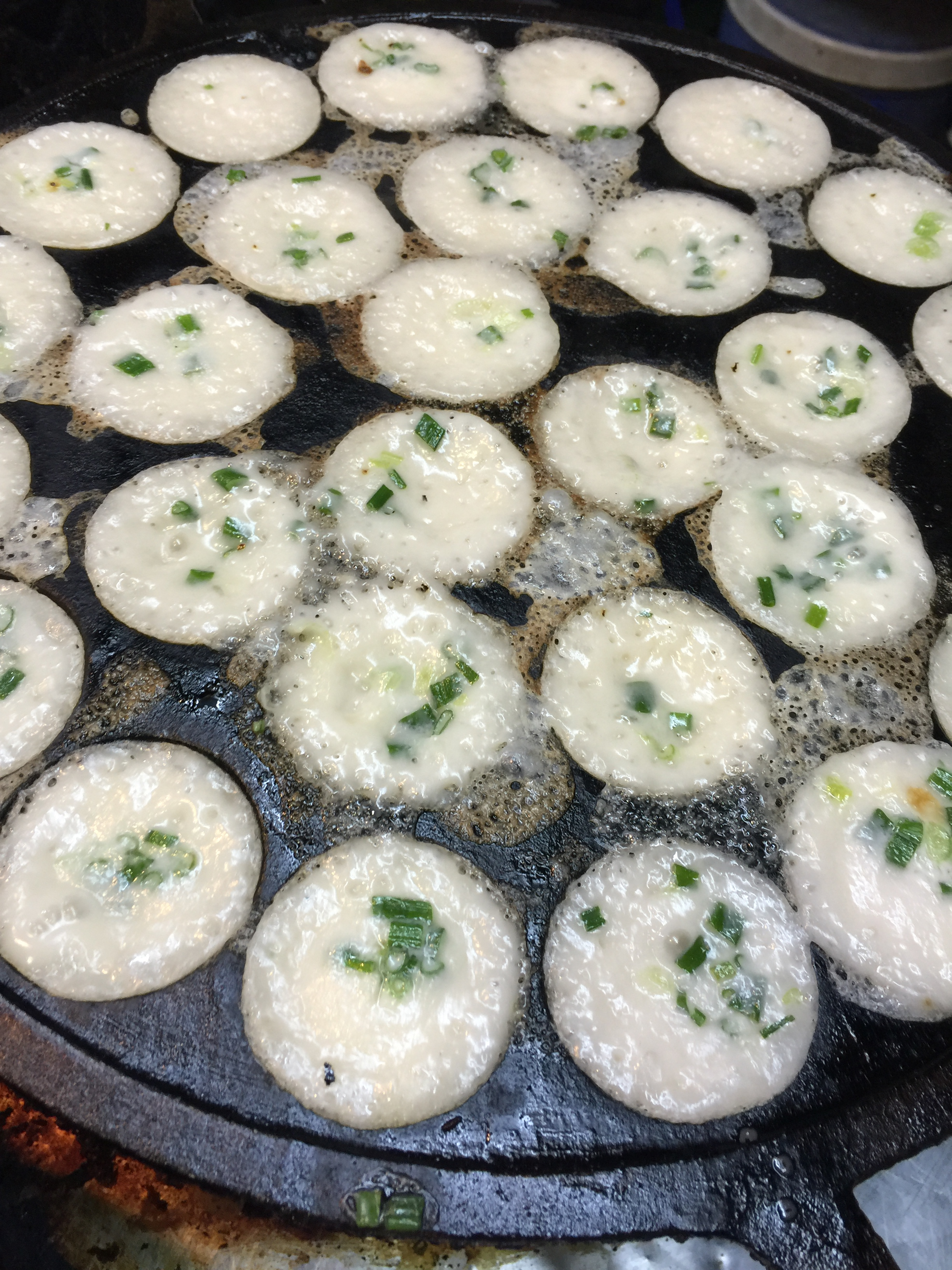
- Khanom krok being cooked in a large indented pan
- Type: Dessert
- Place of origin: Thailand
- Region or state: Southeast Asia
- Associated cuisine: Thailand
- Similar dishes: Bánh khọt (Vietnam), nom krok (Cambodia), mont lin maya (Myanmar), serabi (Indonesia)

Khanom krok or coconut-rice pancakes or mortar toasted pastry, (Thai: ขนมครก, RTGS: khanom khrok, pronounced [kʰā.nǒm kʰrók]) is a traditional Thai dessert. They are prepared by mixing rice flour, sugar, and coconut milk to form a dough. Usually, khanom krok is composed of two batters, one salty and one sweet, both of which are cooked in a heating mantle—a hot indented frying pan. After heating, khanom krok is picked out of the mantle and the two half-circular doughs formed into a circular shape.

Khanom krok is fragrant, sweet and the texture is also smooth from the coconut milk. Similar dishes can also be found in Bangladesh, Myanmar (where it is known as mont lin maya), Laos, Cambodia (where it is known as nom krok), Vietnam (where it is known as bánh khọt), South India (where it is known as Paddu, Paniyaram or Gundpongalu) and Indonesia (where it is known as serabi).

In 2026, Khanom krok was voted the number one Thai dessert by the website TasteAtlas.

== Etymology ==
In Thai, the term Khanom (colloquialism: Nom, Nhom (Thai: หนม)) is contractive form of Tai Lü, Khaonom (Thai: ข้าวหนม, ข้าวนม), or Khao Klaonom (Thai: ข้าวเคล้านม) for desserts or sweets. The term Khanom is not only similar to Kelantan-Pattani Malay term ganuṃ, that can be traced to the Sanskrit godhūma, meaning of wheat, but also associated with Rice pudding, a native old Indian dish making use of rice mixed with milk.

The term Krok is Proto-Tai word grok meaning of mortar, a utensil and military equipment with potholes designed to hold substances or powder.

== Overview ==
Ingredients typically include coconut milk and rice flour. Additional ingredients may include sugar, tapioca or arrowroot flour, white rice, shredded coconut, peanut or corn oil, green onions, corn, taro, pandan essence and cilantro. The mixture is poured within the dimples on a hot heating mantle.

== History ==
Khanom krok was well-known since Ayutthaya period said in Ayutthaya Testimonies:-

"บ้านหม้อ ปั้นหม้อข้าวหม้อแกงใหญ่เล็ก และกระทะเตาขนมครก ขนมเบื้อง..."

(Translation): Ban Mo (Ayutthaya), they molded large and small rice cookers and soup pots from clay and Kanom Krok pan Khanom bueang ...

— Testimonies of the inhabitants of Ayutthaya and its former king, Khun Luang Ha Wat, and the Ayutthaya Chronicle of the Luang Prasoet Aksornniti version, (1972).

In Thai literature, Khun Chang Khun Phaen version by Wachirayan Royal Library of Siam (modern National Library of Thailand), originated around 1600 AD in reign of King Naresuan mentioned Khanom krok in part 37, the second stanza reads:-

ฝ่ายนางศรีมาลาชายตาดู ทั้งข้าไทยิ้มอยู่ไม่นิ่งได้
อีไหมร้องว้ายข้อยอายใจ ลืมไปคิดว่าทำขนมครก

Translation:

Sri Mala stared at scurrying and smiling Tai people. (NN:15)
Mai screamed Oh Jeez! I though I was making Khanom Krok. (NN:16)

The Lanna poem, Khrao Doi Suthep and Khrao So Thanon in Muaeng Chiang Mai, inscribed in Palm-leaf manuscript by Phraya Saenphromma Wohan with Tai Tham script during 1877–87 presented to King Inthawichayanon of Lanna and Princess Thip Keson, also mentioned Khanom krok in colloquial form Nhom krok. The transliterated poem version from Tai Tham script to Thai script by Boontha Sriphimchai reads:-

หนมโก๋ทองหยิบ ฝอยทองเขาห้าง การบัวบาน หนมครก

Translation:

Green bean cake, Thong yip, Foi thong in an amount of mountain of piles, pray ceremony, Nhom Krok.

The kanom krok pan is thought to have popularized during reign of King Narai 1656-88 AD in which not only influenced by Portuguese people after their arrivals in Siam since 1516 AD, but also similar to the æbleskive pan.

And at that time was the beginning of a heating mantle–a hot indented frying pan. First, the dough made by rice immersed in water and mill with thin coconut milk, cooked rice, and shredded coconut that put a little salt then top with undiluted coconut milk. But for the Royal Thai version, they adapt the top of khanom krok to become more diverse. Such as corn top, scallion top, and shrimp top.

== See also ==
- Kuzhi paniyaram
- List of Thai desserts
- List of Thai dishes (includes names in Thai script)
- List of Thai ingredients (includes names in Thai script)
- Thai cuisine
