= Kue semprit =

Indonesian traditional cake

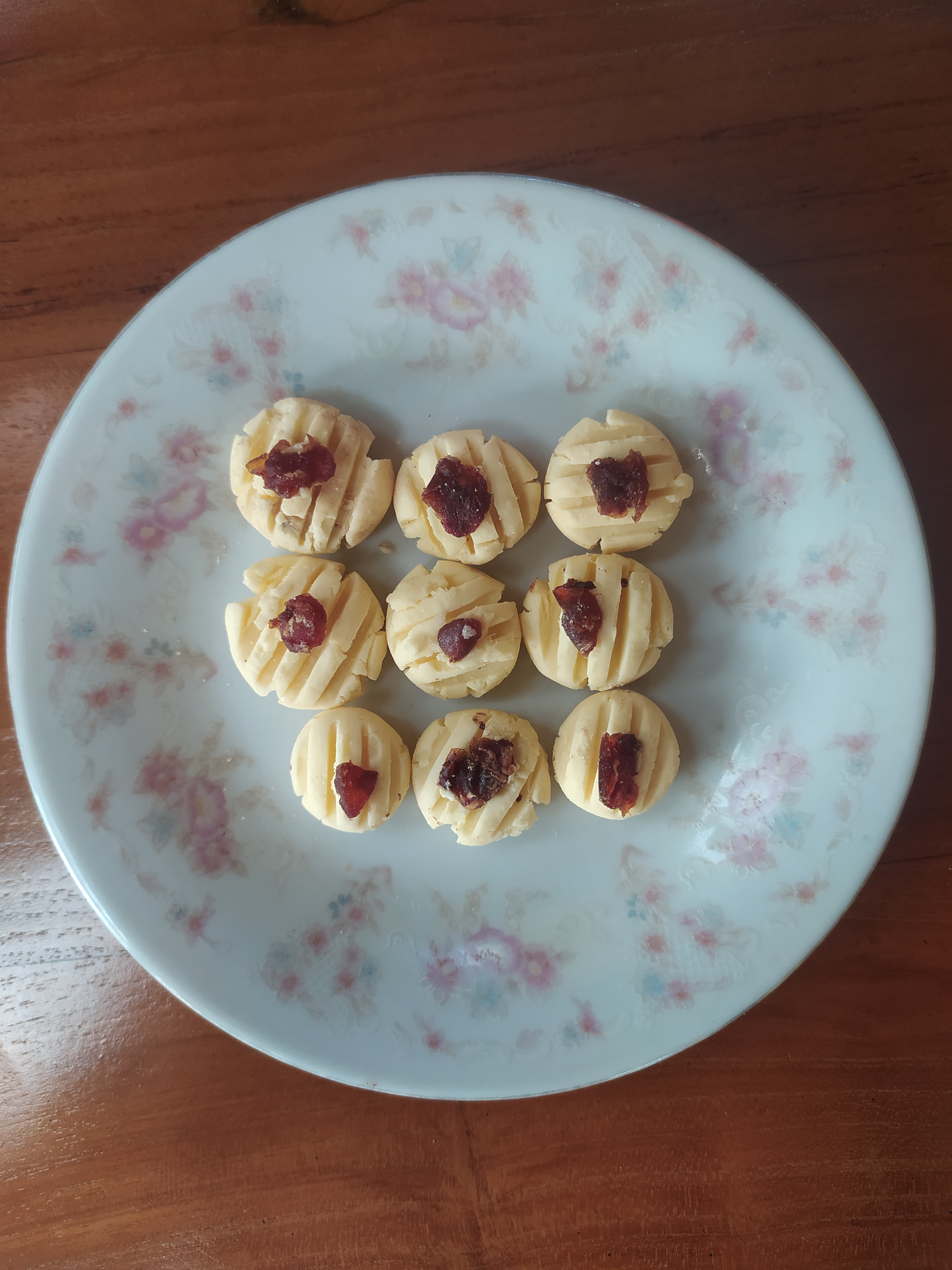
- Kue semprit served in Indonesia
- Type: Cookie, kue
- Course: Dessert or snack
- Place of origin: Indonesia
- Region or state: Maritime Southeast Asia
- Main ingredients: Wheat flour, corn flour, custard powder, sugar, margarine

Semprit (Indonesian: kue semprit), is a Southeast Asian sweet snack (kue) made of wheat flour, corn starch, custard powder, sugar and margarine. These ingredients are mixed together to become a dough. Next, the dough is rolled and cut into small pieces, which are baked until golden yellow. Semprit is ready to eat once it has cooled to room temperature.

Semprit is a popular snack during Hari Raya celebrations.

== See also ==
- Kue semprong
- Putri salju
