= Bolo de arroz =

Portuguese Dessert

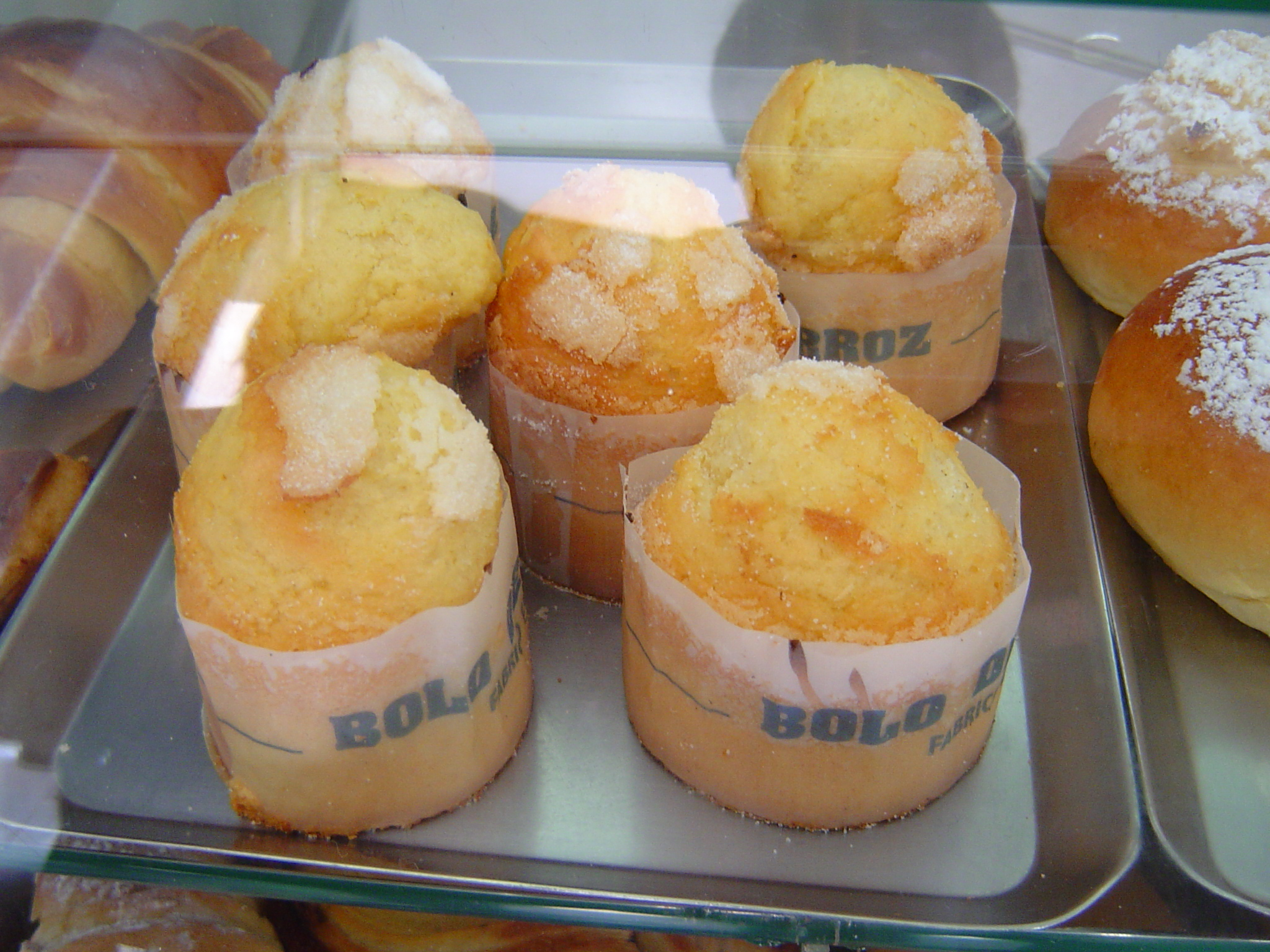
- Course: Dessert
- Place of origin: Portugal
- Region or state: produced worldwide within the Lusosphere
- Main ingredients: Egg yolks
- Variations: Regional

Bolo de arroz is a Portuguese rice muffin, common in Portugal, the Lusosphere countries and regions (which include Brazil, Angola, Mozambique, Cape Verde, São Tomé and Príncipe, Guinea-Bissau, Timor, Timor Leste, Goa, Malacca and Macau) and countries with significant Portuguese immigrant populations, such as Canada, Australia, Luxembourg, the United States, and France, among others.
