= Dadar gulung =

Indonesian coconut pancake

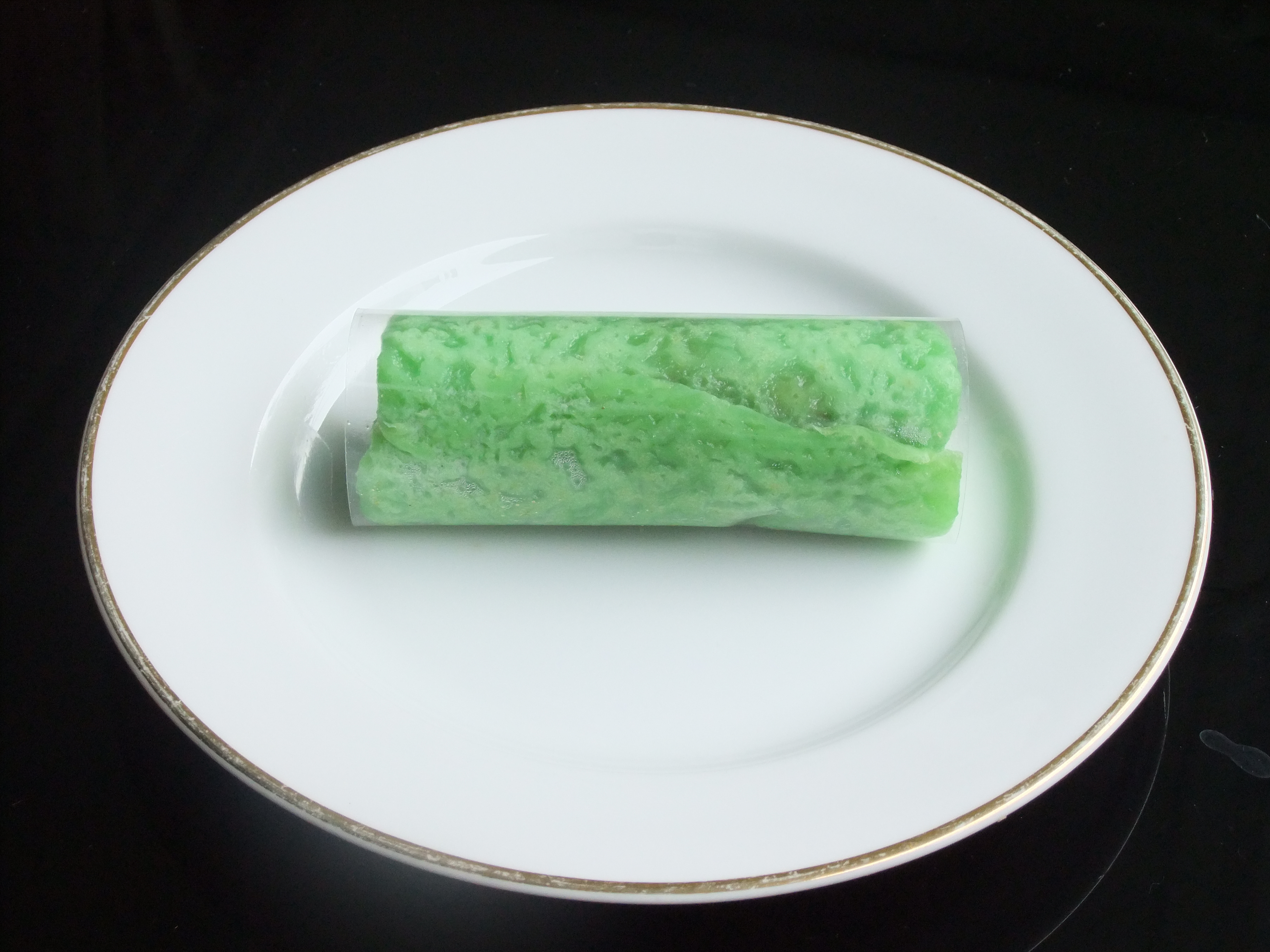
- Green food-coloured dadar gulung
- Alternative names: Kue dadar
- Type: Kue, folded pancake
- Course: Snack
- Place of origin: Indonesia
- Region or state: Java
- Associated cuisine: Indonesia, Brunei, Malaysia, Singapore, Thailand, Philippines and Sri Lanka
- Serving temperature: Warm or room temperature
- Main ingredients: Grated coconut and palm sugar wrapped inside thin omelette made of rice flour and colored green with pandan

Dadar gulung (lit. 'rolled pancake/omelette"') is a popular traditional kue (traditional snack) of sweet coconut pancake. It is often described as an Indonesian coconut pancake.

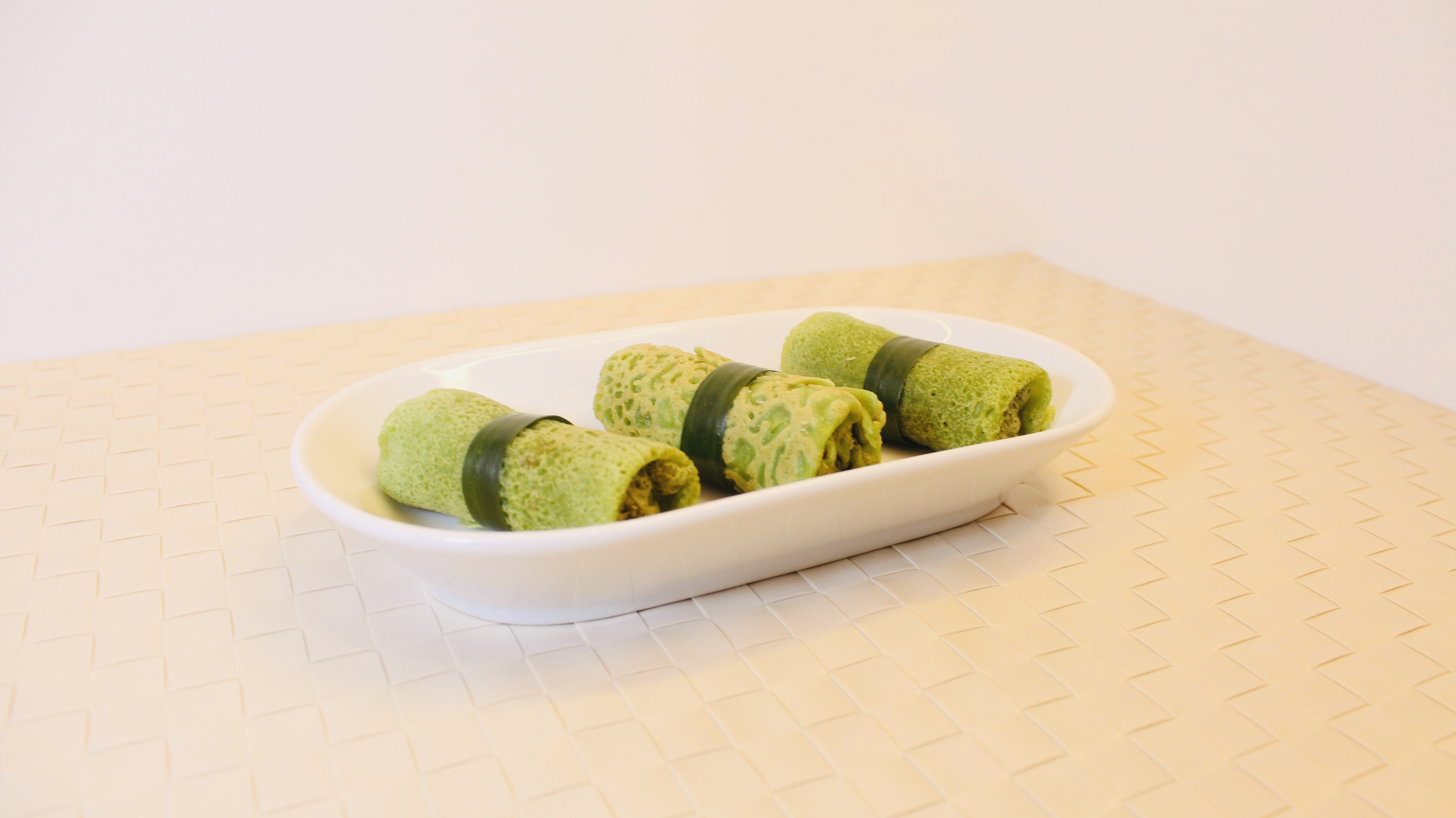
Dadar gulung

Dadar gulung is one of the popular snacks in Indonesia, especially in Java. In Indonesian, dadar literally means "omelette" or "pancake" while gulung means "to roll". The pancake usually has a green colour, which is acquired from daun suji or pandan leaves. It is a green-coloured folded omelette or pancake made of rice flour, filled with grated coconut and palm sugar. It is commonly found in Indonesia, Malaysia and Brunei.

The snack is commonly found in traditional marketplaces and Warung in Indonesia, especially in Java, Bali and other regions. In Malaysia and Brunei, it is known as kuih gulung, kuih ketayap and kuih lenggang. In Sri Lanka it is known as surul appam. Similar to Indonesia, in Singapore it is known as kuih dadar.

== Ingredients and cooking method ==
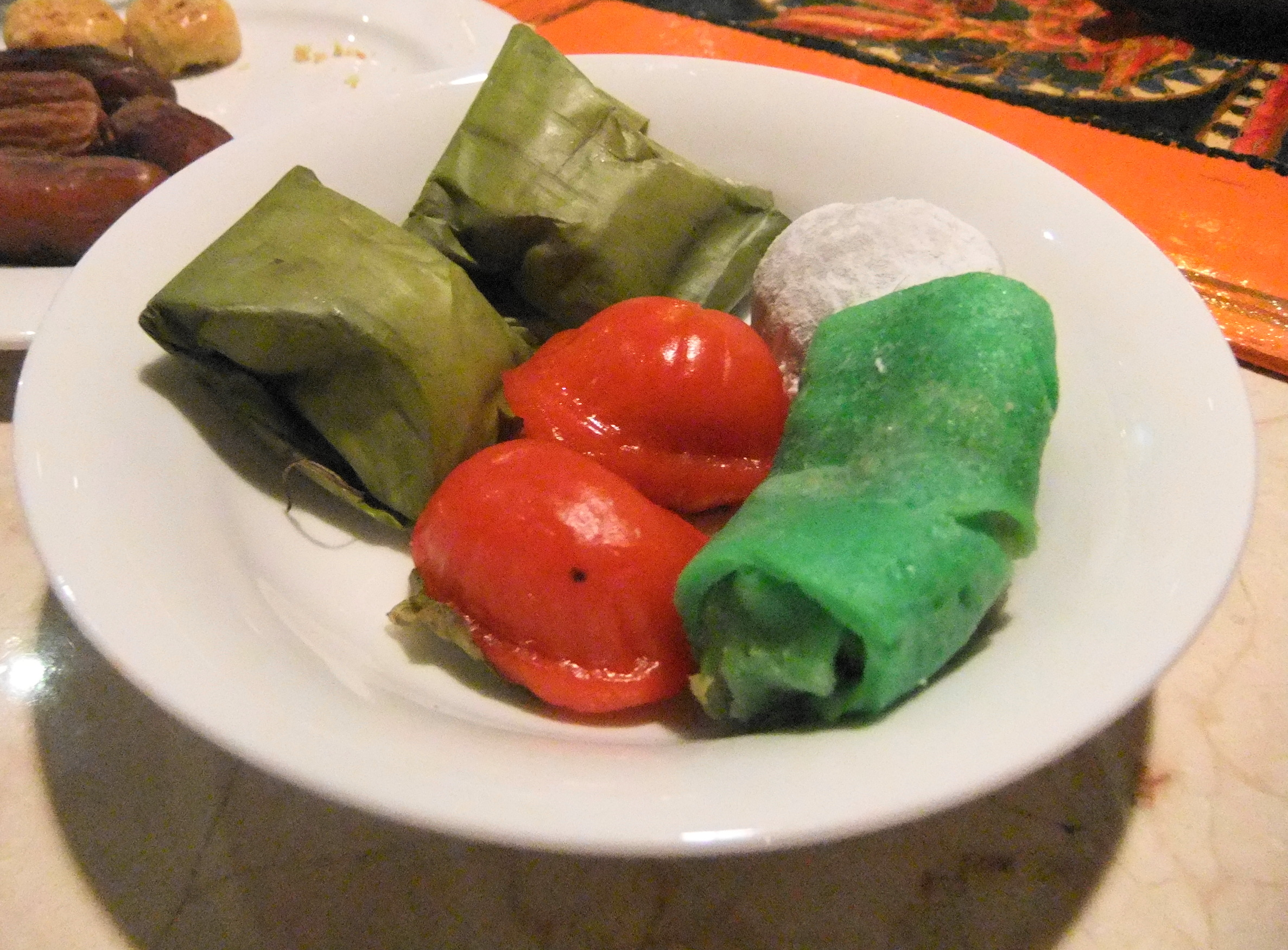
Indonesian popular kue: nagasari, kue ku and dadar gulung.

The batter is made from the mixture of flour, salt, eggs and coconut milk. Mix the batter with suji or daun pandan paste as green food colouring. To make the filling, combine the grated coconut flesh, palm sugar, salt, cinnamon and water in a pot on the stove.

A tied pandan leaf is usually added to the mixture for aroma. The green-coloured batter is then cooked on a flat frying pan with a small amount of margarine, much in the same fashion as baking a thin pancake or omelette. Afterwards, the sweet coconut filling is placed upon the flat green pancake, and then folded on each side just like a tortilla, to create an elongated rectangular shape.

== See also ==
- Daral
- Klepon
- Kue putu
- List of pancakes
- Semar mendem
