= Muffin tin =

Baking pan with individual cups

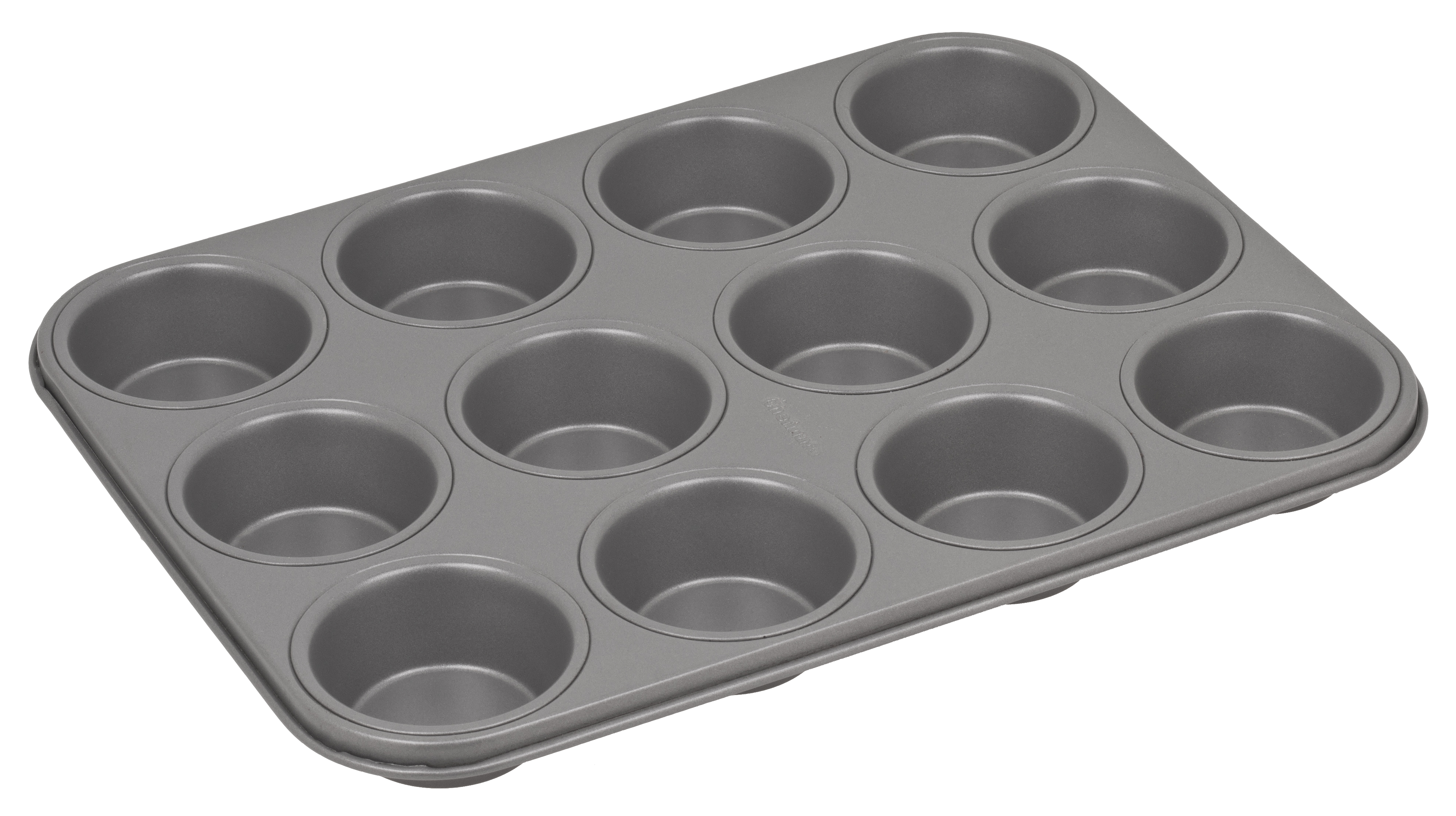
A common muffin/cupcake tin

A muffin or cupcake tray is a mold in which muffins or cupcakes are baked. A single cup within a regular muffin tin is 100 millilitres (3.5 US fl oz) and most often has room for 12 muffins, although tins holding 6, 8, 11, 24, and 35 muffins do exist. A single cup within a mini muffin tin is 62.8 millilitres (2.125 US fl oz), and because these are less common, there are several standard numbers of cups per tin, including 6, 12, and 24 cups per tin. A single cup within a jumbo muffin tin is 242.13 millilitres (8.1875 US fl oz), and again because these are uncommon, there are several standard numbers of cups per tin, including 4, 6, and 12 cups per tin.

Muffin tins can be made out of aluminum, stainless steel, cast iron, or silicone. In addition, aluminum and stainless steel muffin tins may be coated with Teflon or other non-stick coatings. Historically, galvanized steel has been used for muffin tins but this is no longer common.

== See also ==
- List of food preparation utensils
