= Serabi =

Indonesian type of pancake

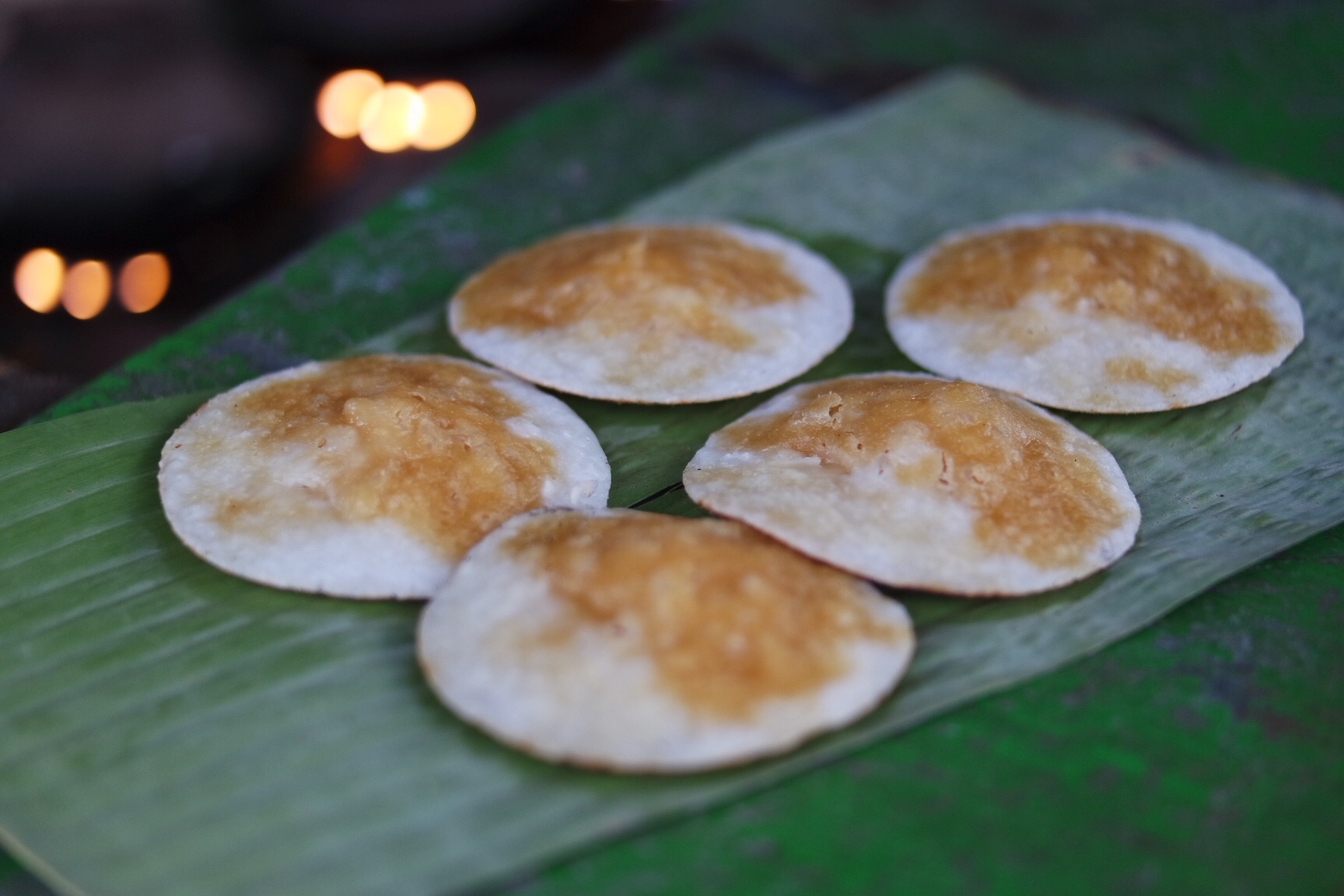
- Simple Javanese sweet serabi flavoured with sweet gula jawa
- Alternative names: soerabi (in Petjo); Javaans pannenkoek (in Dutch)
- Type: Pancake
- Place of origin: Indonesia
- Region or state: Bali–Java
- Associated cuisine: Indonesia, Malaysia
- Main ingredients: Rice flour, coconut milk or shredded coconut
- Similar dishes: mont lin maya, pancake, pannenkoek, takoyaki, khanom krok

Serabi, (Note: in Javanese) surabi, (Note: in Sundanese) srabi (Note: in Balinese) or serabai (Note: in Malay) is a traditional Bali–Java snack, similar to a pancake, made of a rice flour-based batter with coconut milk or coconut cream and shredded coconut as an emulsifier. Most traditional serabi tastes sweet, as these pancake-like desserts are usually eaten with kinca, a golden-brown coconut sugar syrup in the Sundanese culinary tradition.

However, another savoury version also existed that used fermented oncom toppings. Different provinces in Indonesia have their own serabi recipes corresponding to local tastes. Serabi, known as serabai in Malay, can also be found in Malaysia.

== History ==
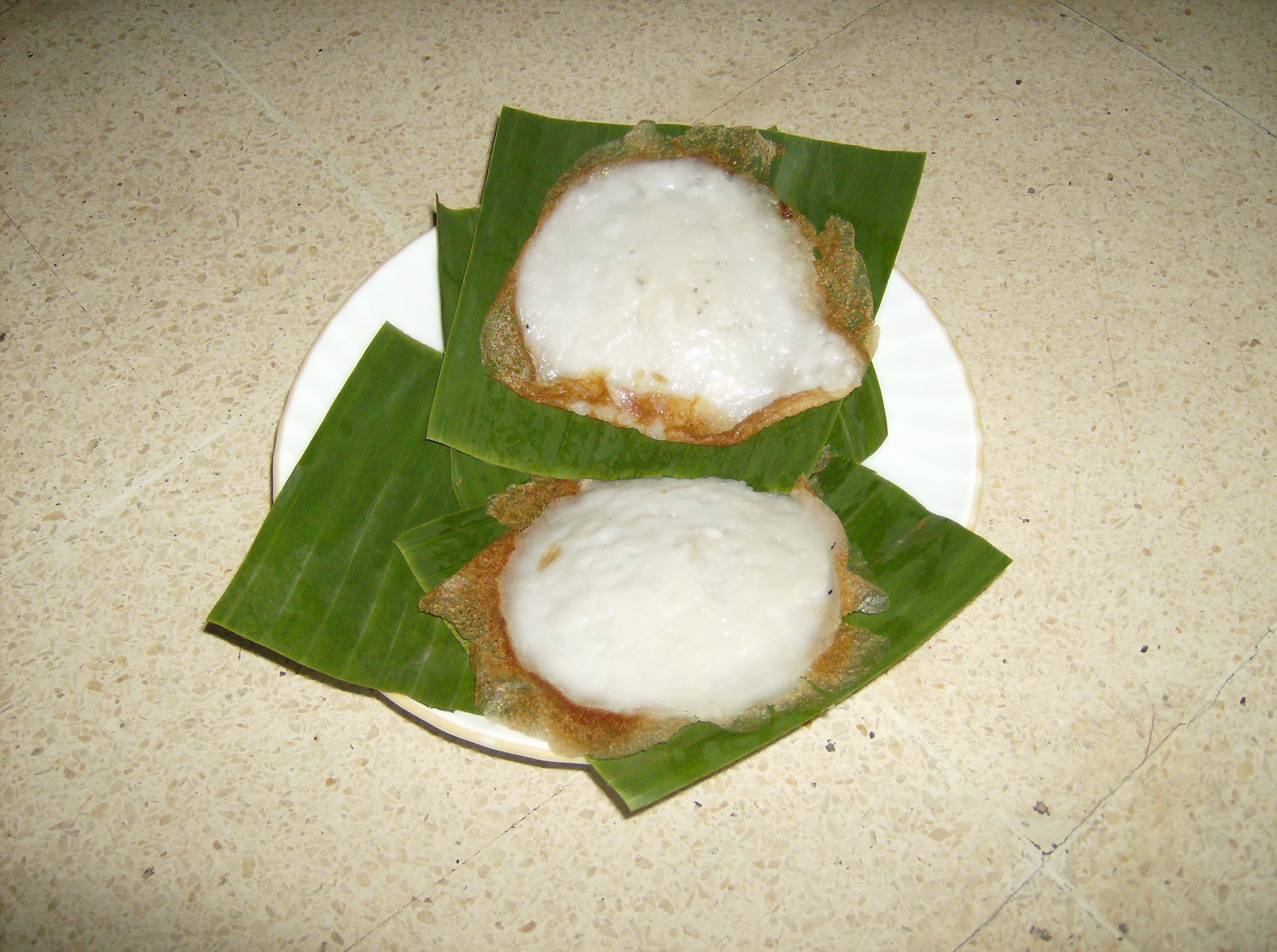
Srabi is placed in a banana leaf "pincuk" container then drizzled with brown sugar (Coconut sugar) coconut milk.

The history of serabi is unknown, but these traditional snacks are commonly served as an offering in Javanese folk religion rituals as a symbol of gratitude towards God or the local deities of Java. This cultural tradition, still in practice, is called Serabhien among the Pandalungan village community (the Madurese of Javanese descent) in Bondowoso (eastern Java), called Serabi Kocor among the Javanese community in Yogyakarta (southern Java), and called the Serabi Likuran among the Javanese community in Pemalang (central Java).

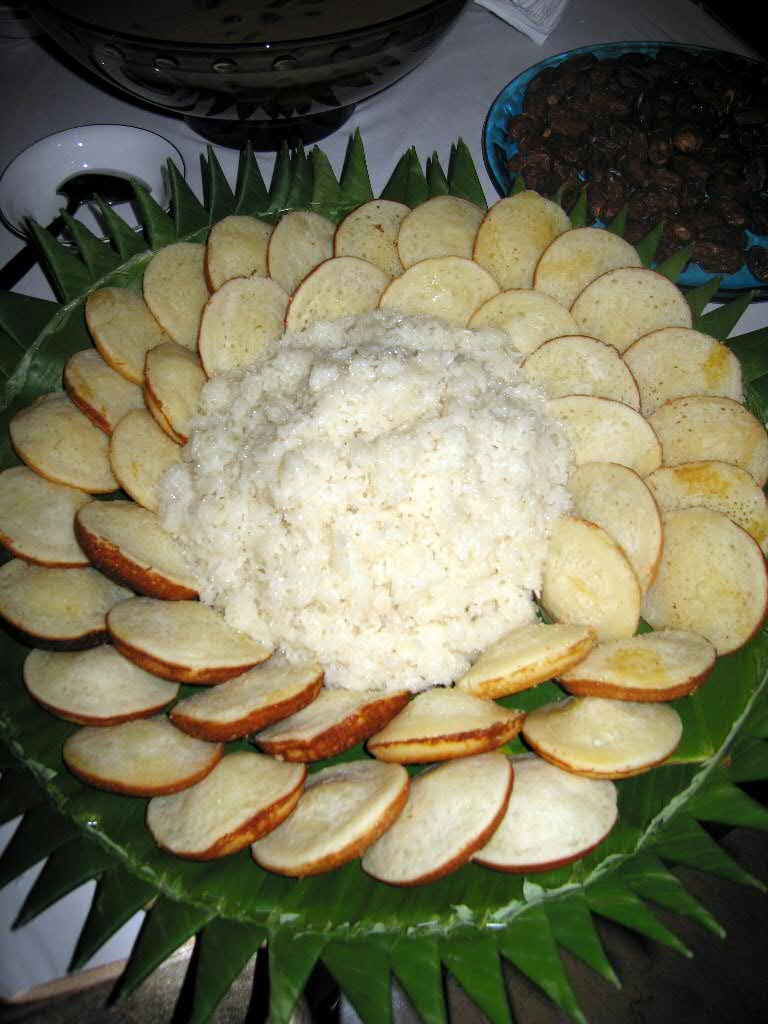
An offering of serabi for local deities in a Balinese-Javanese religious ritual

Originating in Java, the popularity of serabi has spread to neighbouring islands, especially Bali, (srabi) in Balinese. This spread was due to Javanese migration, notably during the Majapahit era (14th–16th century) when western coastal Balinese adopted the food as an 'offering snack for the gods' in their local Balinese Hindu rituals. During the 17th century, when the Dutch colonized Java (and other Indonesian regions in general), serabi and also dadar gulung (rolled coconut pancake) became colloquially known as the Javaans pannenkoek (lit. 'Javanese pancake' in Dutch) due to its shape, which resembles the pannenkoek (Dutch pancake). However, the Suriname Javanese community in South America still uses the term Javaans pannenkoek to refer to serabi, dadar gulung, and similar traditional Javanese pancake-like snacks.

== Variants ==
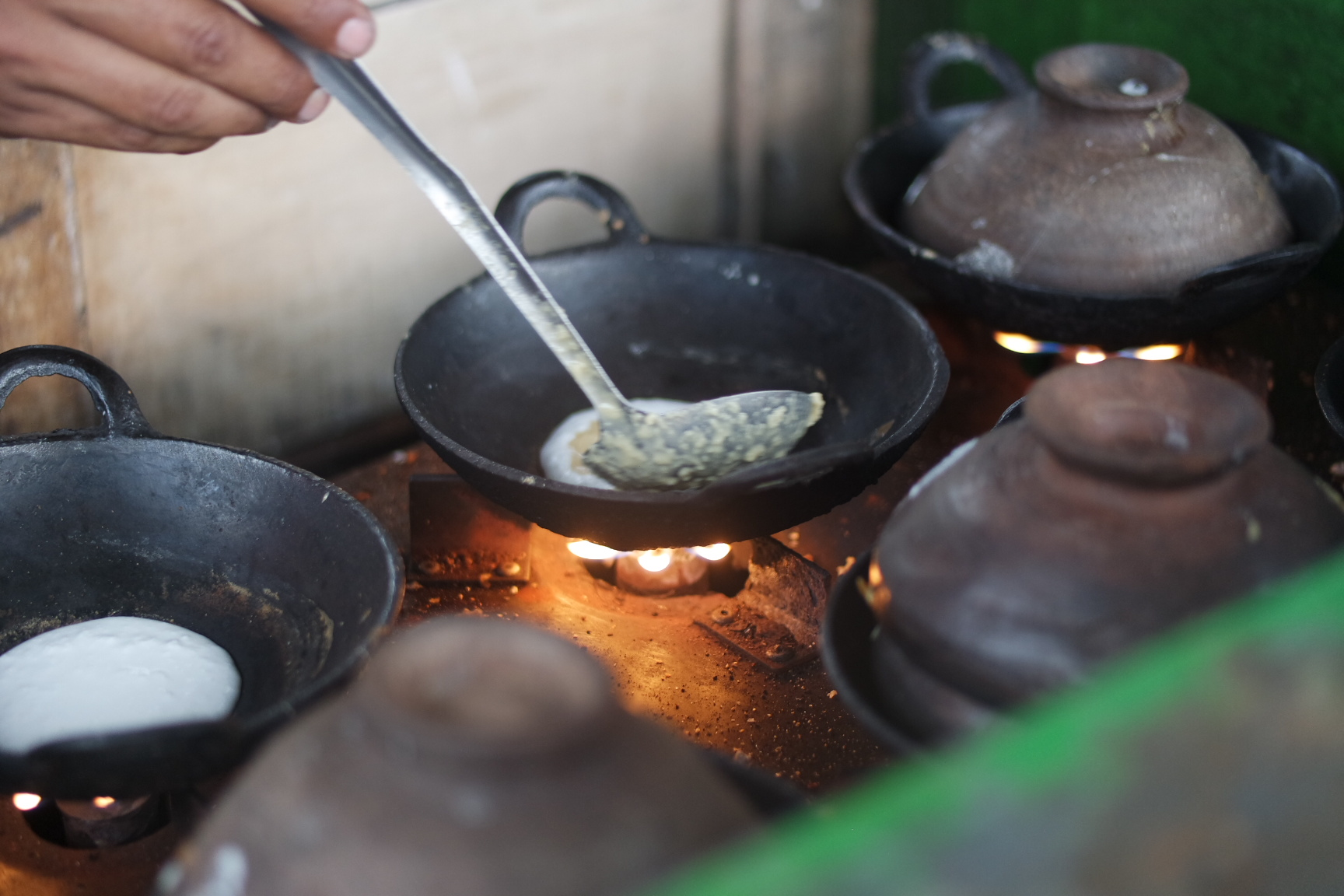
Cooking serabi.

The most basic traditional serabi only employs batter made from rice flour, coconut milk, and coconut sugar, cooked on a small earthenware frying pan on charcoal fire. Sometimes pandan leaf juice is added to this batter mixture to add aroma and a greenish color. During the cooking process, toppings are sometimes added to the batter.

Today, a large variants of serabi toppings are used, from a simple sprinkle of sugar, grated coconut flesh, coarsely ground peanuts, to slices of banana or jackfruit, chocolate sprinkles, black glutinous rice, and oncom. Newer recipes use grated cheddar cheese, corned beef, shredded chicken, slices of fresh strawberry or sausage, or even strawberry ice cream. The sauce (or more precisely syrup) to accompany serabi also varies, from the traditional sweet kinca (golden coconut sugar syrup) sometimes with coconut milk, to modern recipes using chocolate, strawberry, or durian syrup, or even mayonnaise or cream cheese for a savoury Western twist.

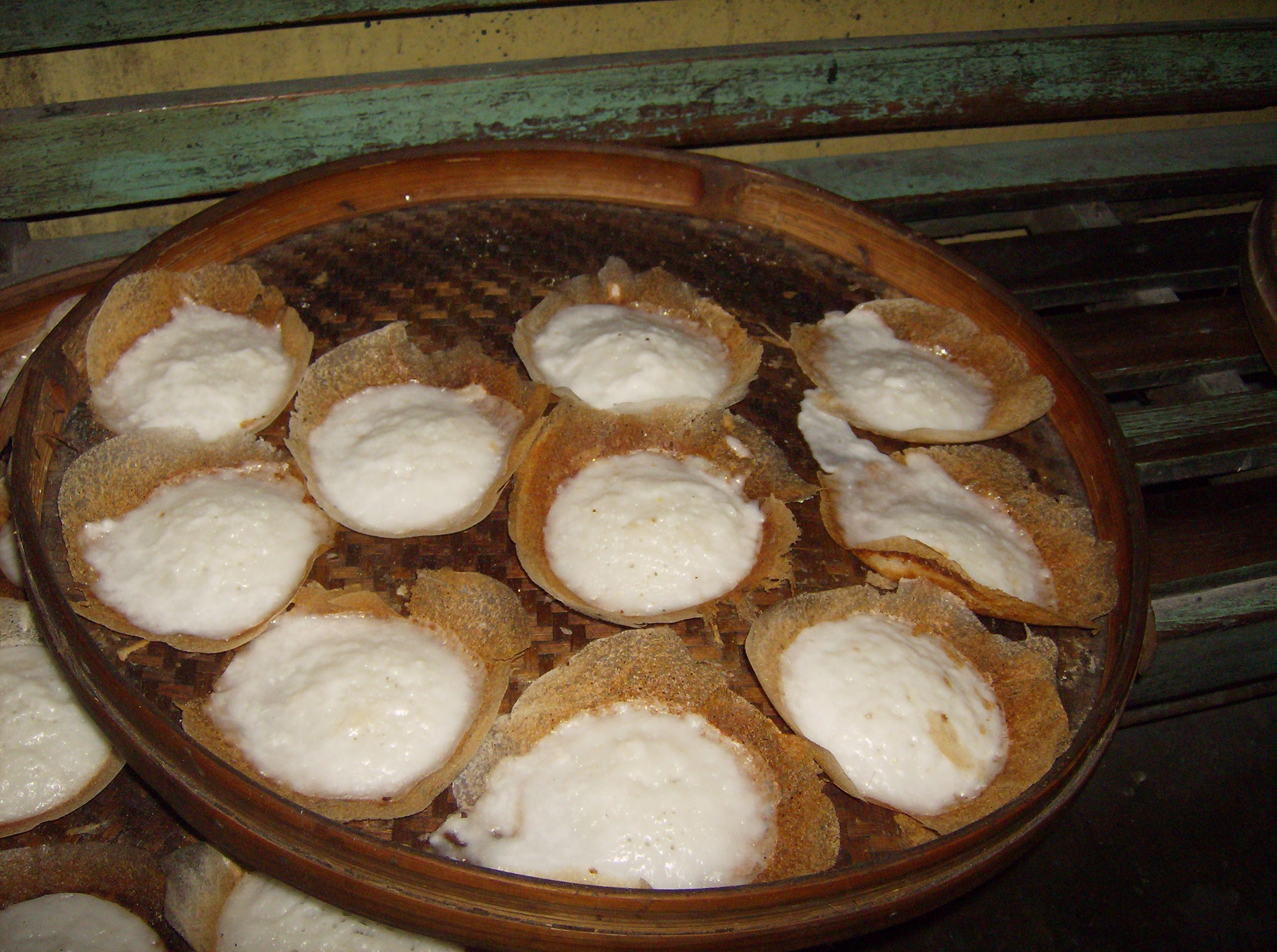
Serabi Notosuman, Solo, Central Java

Both the cities of Bandung and Solo are famous for their versions of serabi. Bandung surabi is drier and firmer with a pancake-like consistency, well known for a rich variety of toppings and recently developed fusion recipes. The serabi from Solo, however, is more traditional and only half-cooked, resulting in a thin, crispy crust but a watery center with a rich coconut milk taste. A famous serabi variant from Solo is called serabi notosuman.

In Ambarawa, serabi is served with a sweet coconut milk soup and is known as serabi ngampin.

In Semarang, a dish called bubur serabi involves a bubur sumsum (Javanese pudding) with some small serabi doused with coconut milk and liquid brown sugar. It is served in a bowl made from banana leaves.

== See also ==
- Coconut sugar, a Javanese sugar
- List of pancakes, types of pancakes from world cuisines
- Dadar gulung, a traditional Javanese snack similar to serabi
- Pannenkoek, the Dutch pancake
- Æbleskiver, a similarly-fried Danish confectionery served with jam or powdered sugar.
- Khanom krok, a Thai dish
- Mont lin maya, a Burmese dish
- Neyyappam, a fermented South Indian sweet dumpling fried in ghee
- Paddu, a fermented South Indian dumpling that can be made spicy with chillies or sweet with jaggery
- Pinyaram, an Indonesian dish
- Poffertjes, a Dutch sweet dish
- Unni appam, a fermented South Indian sweet dumpling
