= Kue cubit =

Indonesian traditional cake

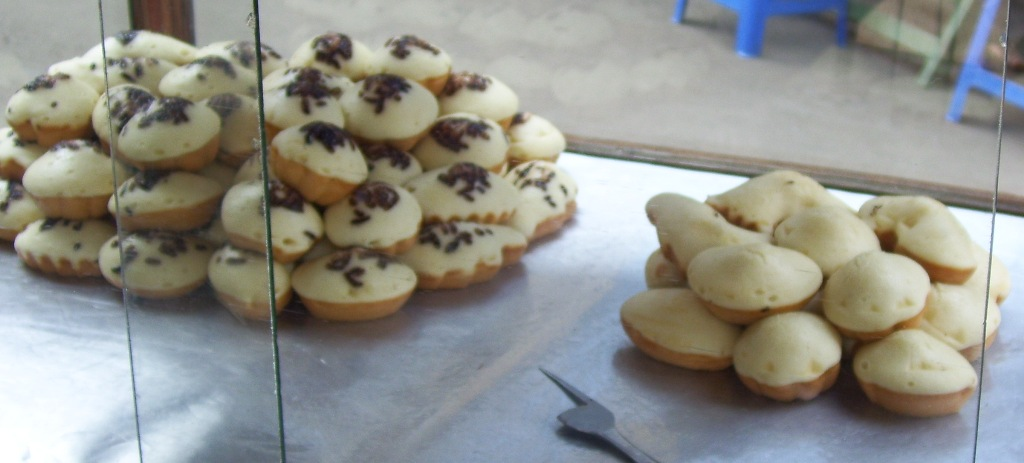
- Type: Cake
- Place of origin: Indonesia
- Region or state: Southeast Asia
- Main ingredients: Flour, sugar, milk, baking powder
- Variations: Laba-laba

Kue cubit is a Southeast Asian snack, originating from Indonesia. It is common snack food served in many Indonesian cities. It is a cake, around 4 centimetres (1.6 in) in diameter. The sellers of this snack usually operate near schools or traditional markets. Kue cubit uses flour, baking powder, sugar and milk as its primary ingredients. The liquid dough is poured into a steel plate with several small round basins so that it will form a round shape when cooked, and poured with meises (chocolate sprinkles) on top of it. The sellers usually use a special hooked stick to take the cake off from the steel plate.

The cake is called kue "cubit" (Indonesian: pinch) because of its small size: to eat it one has to pinch it. Another variant is called kue "laba-laba" (Indonesian: spider), referring to its spider-web-like form created by pouring the liquid dough spread around the steel plate. The cake is related to the Dutch poffertjes.

== See also ==
- Kue
- List of cakes
