= Batter (cooking) =

Flour mixture used before frying

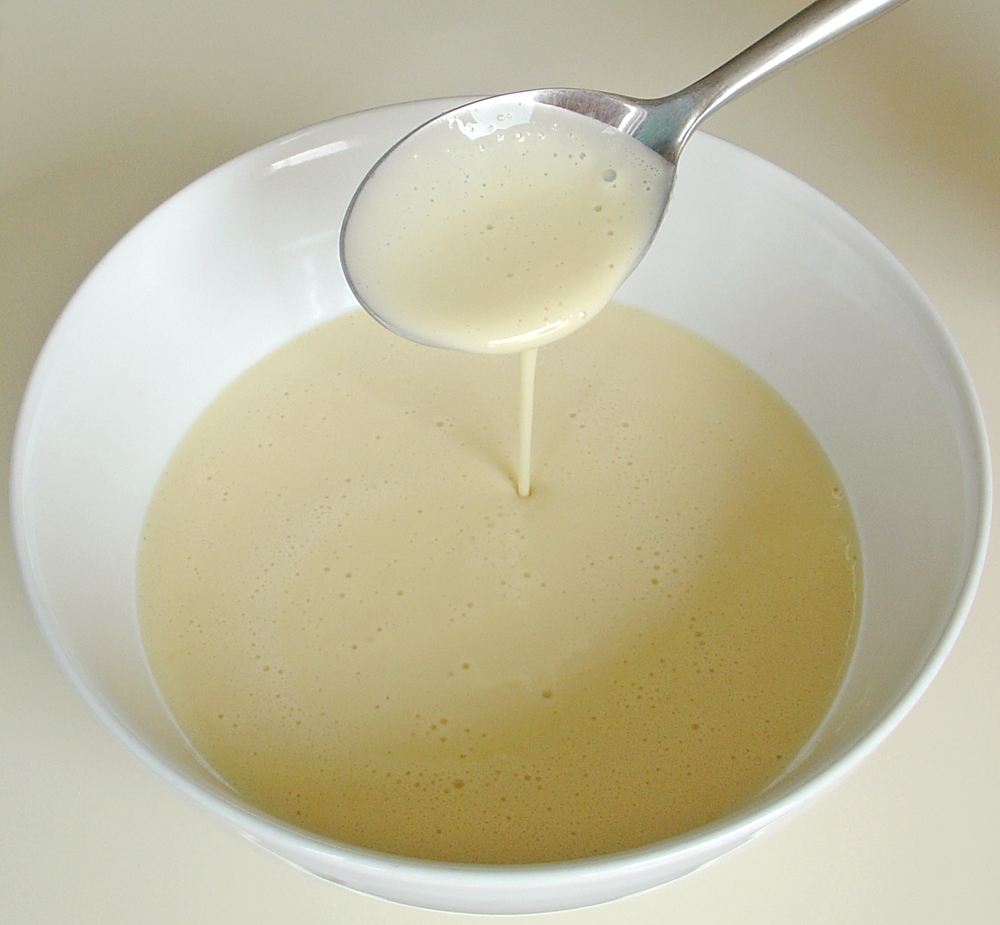
A thin batter for English pancakes

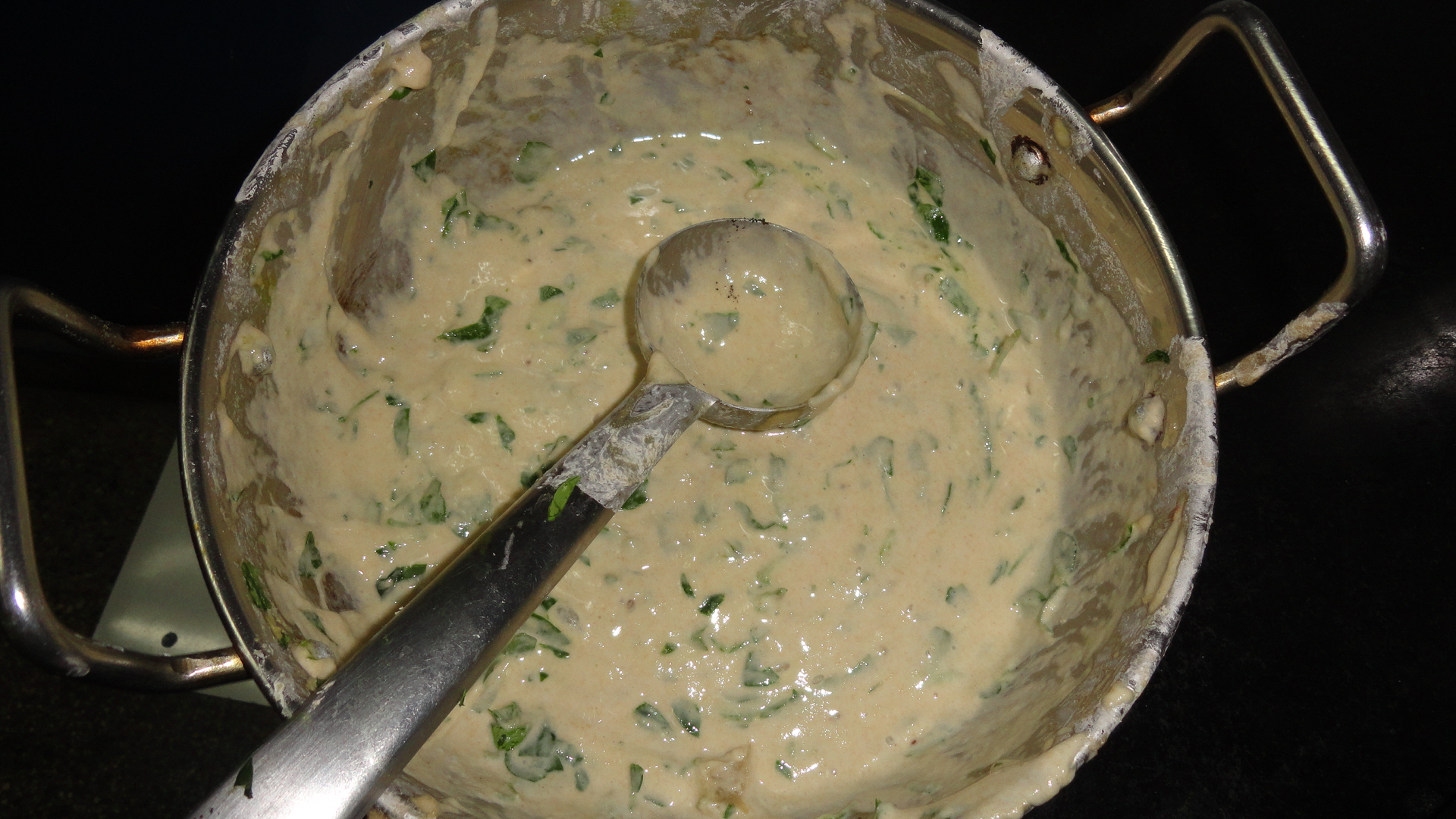
Wheat batter mixed with fenugreek leaves for making dosa

Batter is a flour mixture with liquid and other ingredients such as sugar, salt, egg, milk and leavening used for cooking. Batters are a pourable consistency that cannot be kneaded. Batter is most often used for cake, pancakes and as a coating for fried foods. It is also used for a variety of batter breads.

The word batter comes from the French word battre, which means to beat, as many batters require vigorous beating or whisking in their preparation.

== Methods ==
Many batters are made by combining flour with liquids such as water, milk, or eggs. Batters can also be made by soaking grains in water and grinding them wet. Often a leavening agent such as baking powder is included to aerate and fluff up the batter as it cooks, or the mixture may be naturally fermented for this purpose as well as to add flavour. Carbonated water or another carbonated liquid such as beer may instead be used to aerate the batter in some recipes, such as for Fanta cake. Other substitutes for water are wine, or flavored liquors like curaçao, brandy, and maraschino.

The viscosity of batter may range from very "heavy" (adhering to an upturned spoon) to "thin" (similar to single cream, enough to pour or drop from a spoon and sometimes called "drop batter"). Heat is applied to the batter, usually by frying, baking, or steaming, to cook the ingredients and to "set" the batter into a solid form. Batters may be sweet or savoury, often with either sugar or salt added (sometimes both). Many other flavourings such as herbs, spices, fruits, or vegetables may be added to the mixture.

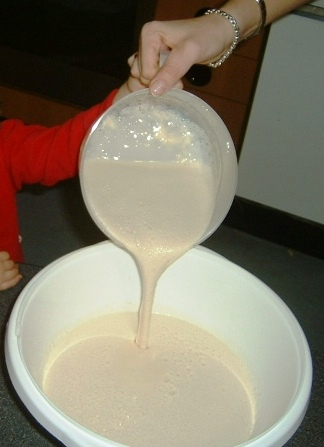
Crêpe batter

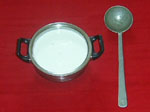
Batter with a batter spoon

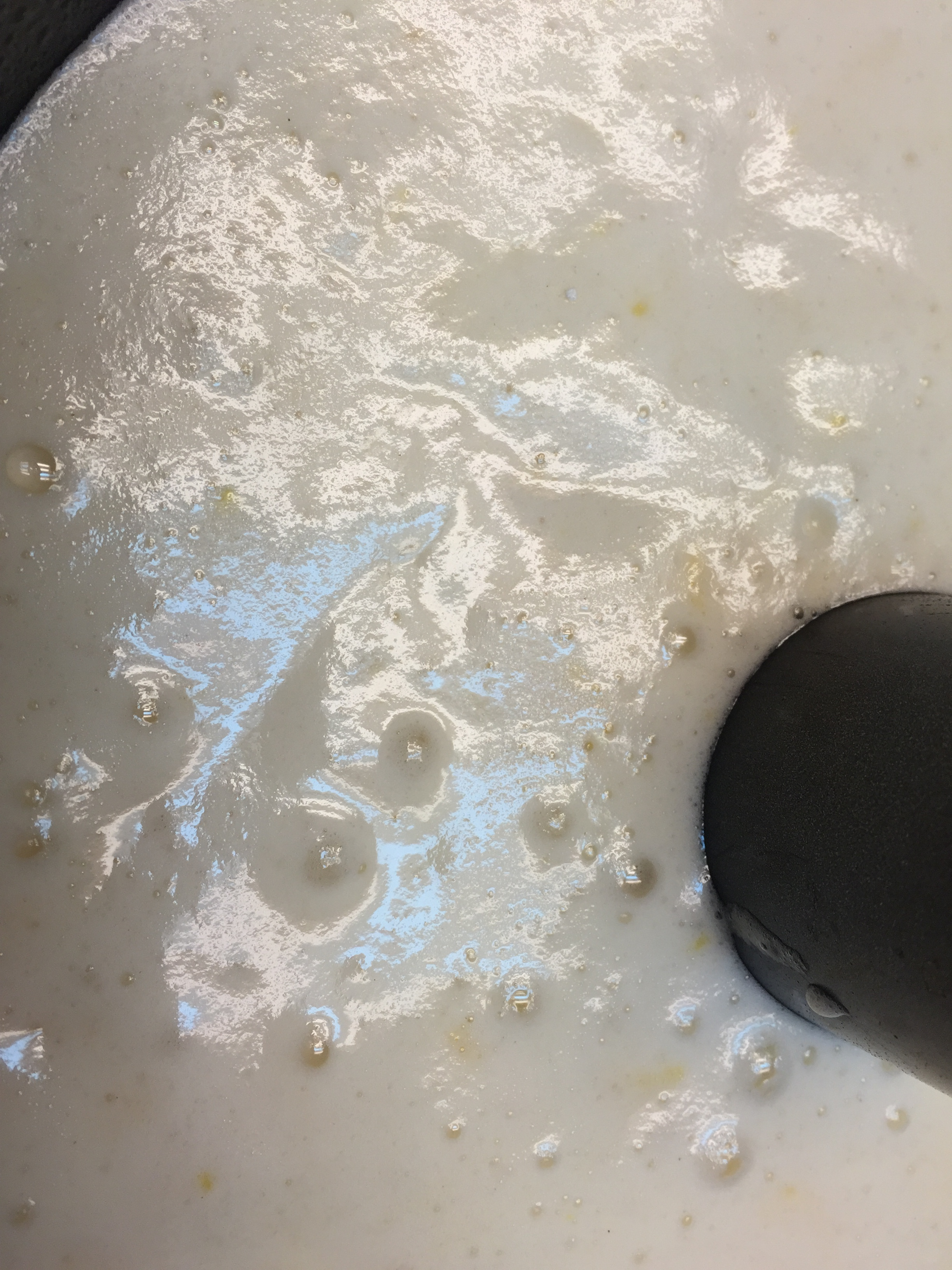
Close-up view of angel food cake batter

== Beer batter ==
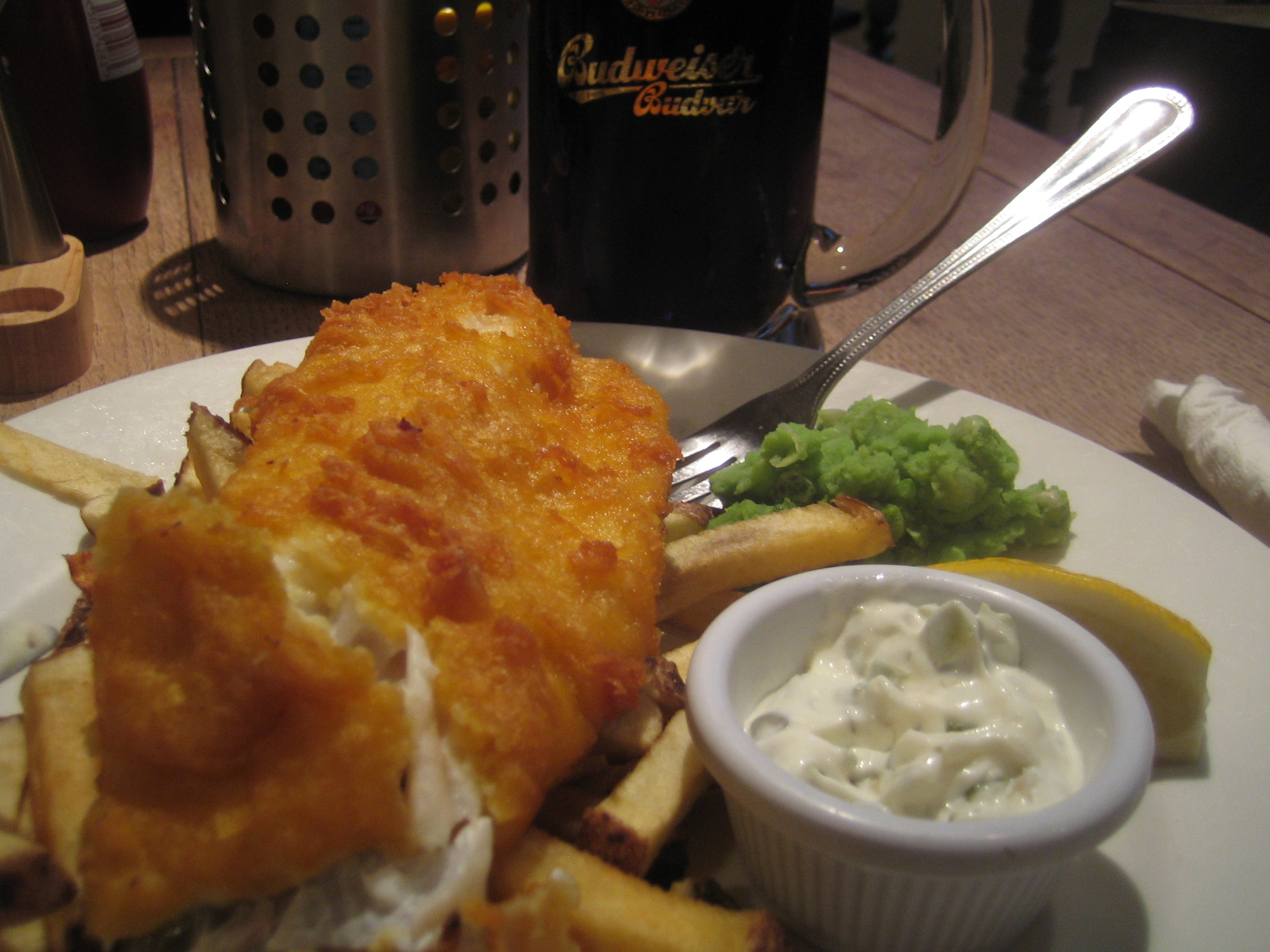
Fish and chips prepared with beer batter

Beer is a popular ingredient in batters used to coat foods before frying. One reason is that a basic batter can be made from merely flour, beer, and some salt. The purpose of using beer is so the bubbles in the beer will add body and lightness to the batter. Depending on the type and quality of the beer, it may also add colour or some flavour to the batter. The practice of beer battering is popular in Australia, New Zealand, the United States, Britain, Ireland, Germany, Iceland and Russia. Foods that are commonly beer-battered and fried include fish, chips, and onion rings.

== Cuisine and batters ==
Batters are used in many cuisines under many names. Tempura in Japan, pakoda and dosa in India, galapong in the Philippines, spoonbread in the US, and many other examples are all types of batters. The ideal batter for fried foods is to be thick enough to adhere to the food, but not so thick as to become heavy.

Batters made with wheat flour thicken with every second that passes after mixing because of the development of gluten. Strategies to reduce this effect include the use of ice water when mixing, alcohol (which does not mix with the flour to produce gluten), and making it at the last possible moment before use.
