= Betawi cuisine =

Cuisine of the Betawi people of Jakarta, Indonesia

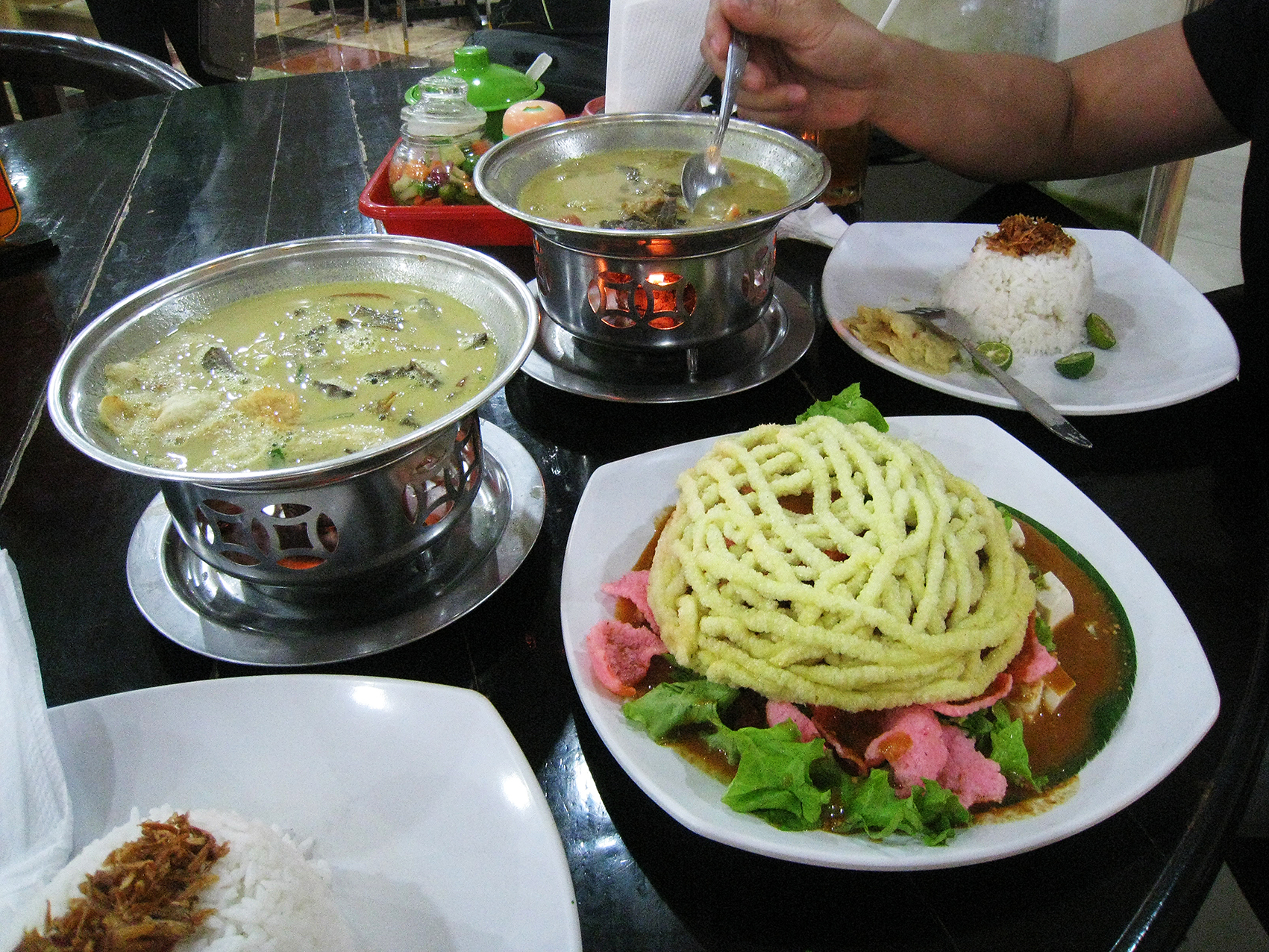
Betawi dishes; soto betawi and asinan betawi in a Betawi restaurant at Sarinah, Central Jakarta.

Betawi cuisine draws from a range of culinary traditions. This comes from the Betawi people being composed of regional immigrants from areas in the Indonesian archipelago, as well as Chinese, Indian, Arab, and European traders, visitors and immigrants that were attracted to the port city of Batavia (today modern Jakarta).

== History and influences ==
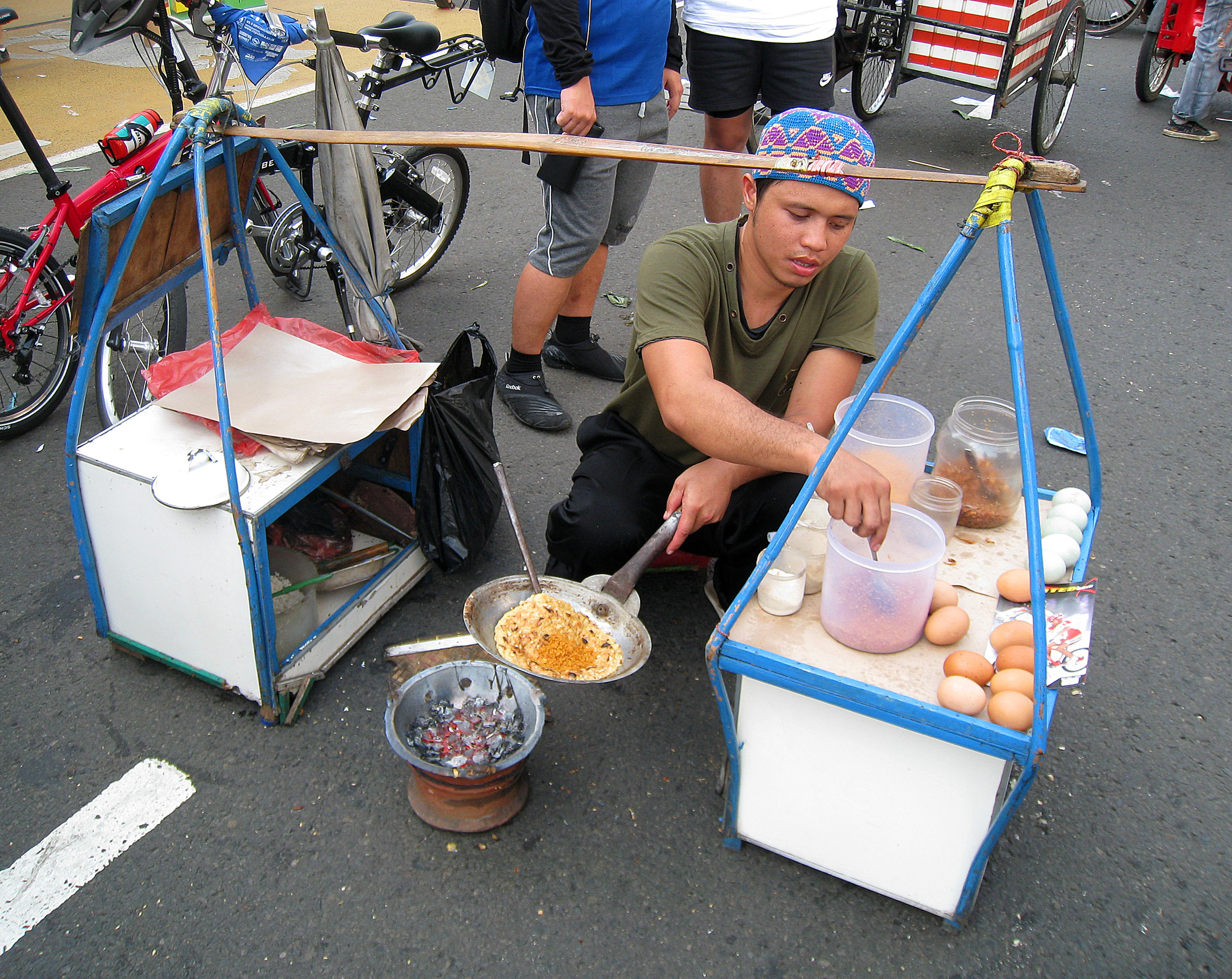
Kerak telor vendor selling spicy coconut omelettes during Jakarta Fair

Betawi cuisine developed and evolved with influences from various cuisine traditions brought by waves of newcomers to the port city on the north coast of Western Java. From the small port of Sunda Kalapa, it grew into an active hub of international trade, primarily involving Indonesian, Chinese, Indian and Arab traders. By the early 16th century, drawn by the spice trade, the Portuguese were the first Europeans to arrive, followed by the Dutch later in the same century. During colonial VOC era, foreign communities were kept in enclaves under Dutch colonial rule; as the result the culinary concentration grew in each area: Tanah Abang for Arab cuisine, the Glodok and Kuningan area for Chinese food, and Tugu in North Jakarta for Portuguese.

Betawi cuisine is similar to Peranakan cuisine, another hybrid cuisines heavily influenced by Chinese and Malay, as well as Arab and European, cuisines, to neighboring Sundanese and Javanese cuisine. Nasi uduk, for example, a savory rice cooked in coconut milk and served with several side dishes, may be a local version of the Malay dish nasi lemak. Asinan, cured and brined pickled vegetables, and rujak juhi, vegetables served with shredded dried squid and peanut sauce, demonstrate Chinese influences. Because of this common heritage, some of Betawi cuisines, such as asinan and lontong cap go meh, are shared with Chinese Indonesian. Betawi cuisine also shares some recipes and dishes with neighboring Sundanese, such as both of them are familiar with sayur asem, gado-gado (lotek) and semur jengkol. Another examples are nasi kebuli and soto betawi that uses minyak samin (ghee), which indicates Arab or Muslim Indian influences.

Some dishes were created due to price constraints. For example, kerak telor was created due to the low quality of local glutinous rice, with the egg and other toppings added for flavor and satisfaction. Soto tangkar, which today is a meat soup, was mostly made from the broth of goat rib-cage bones in the past because meat was expensive, or the common population of Batavia were too poor to afford some meat back then.

Today, many older Betawi dishes are hard to find even in the region. This is partly because as a cosmopolitan city, Jakarta also features dishes from across Indonesia, as well as international cuisines, and in part because the during the development of Jakarta, the Betawi community were moved to the marginal suburbs in and around Greater Jakarta in the wave of development. Some restaurants continue to make older dishes, viewing such efforts as heritage cuisine preservation. These dishes include rare gabus pucung, and pecak gabus, snakehead fish (Channa striata) in pecak sauce.

== Ingredients and cooking method ==
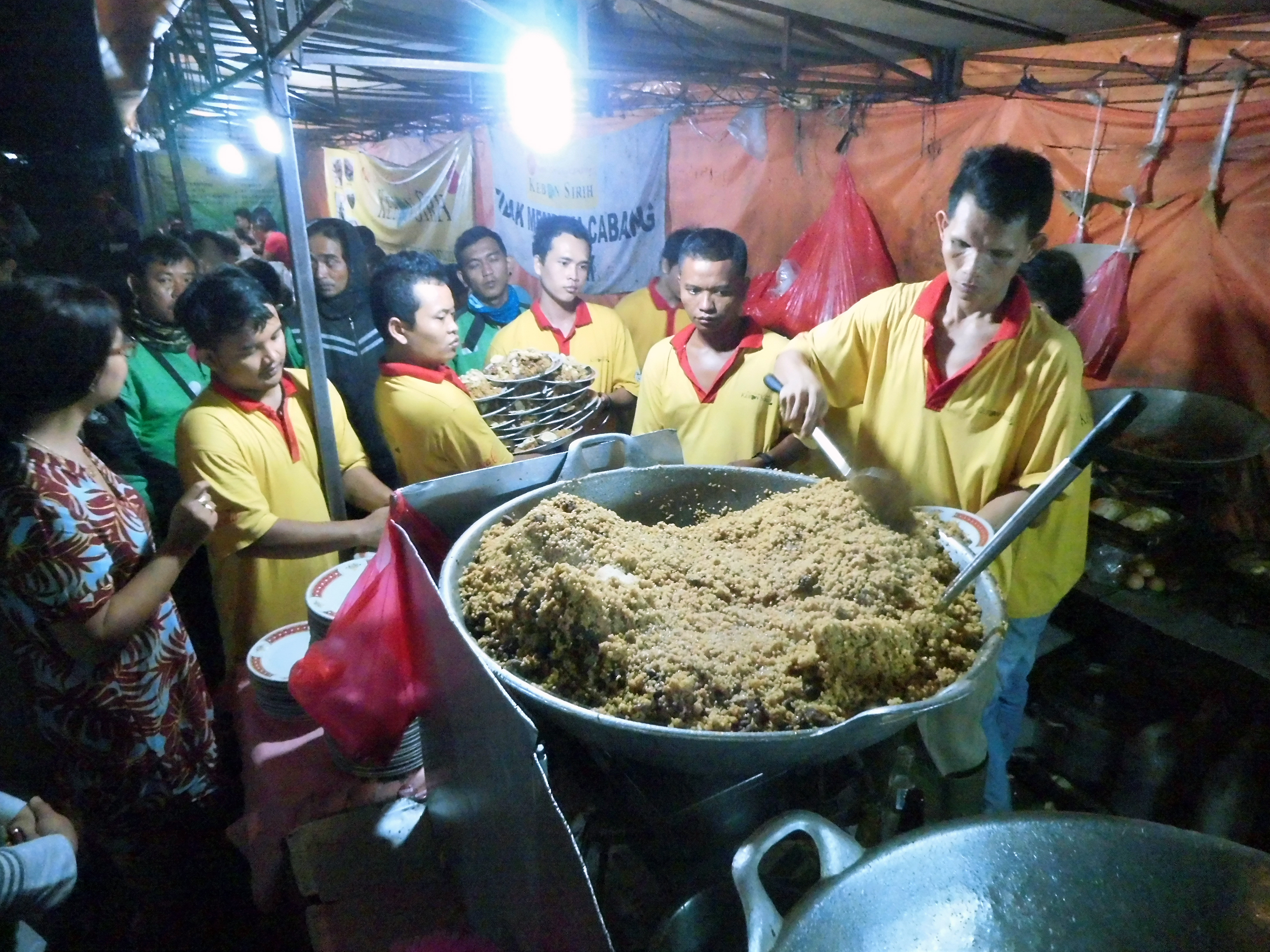
Cooking nasi goreng kambing (fried rice with goat meat) in bulk in Kebon Sirih area, Central Jakarta.

Betawi cuisine uses rice as staples, numbers of its dishes are revolved around rice, either steamed, cooked in coconut milk as nasi uduk (coconut rice), or compressed as ketupat sayur or lontong sayur rice cakes in vegetables soup. As a Muslim-majority community, Betawi people favour beef, mutton and goat meat, as they adhere to Islamic halal dietary-law which forbid pork consumption. Fishes are consumed too. Unusual for a coastal city, there are hardly any seafood dishes in Betawi cuisine. But there are plenty of freshwater fish dishes, using local varieties of snakehead fish and carp.

Popular Betawi dishes include soto betawi (beef offals in milky broth), sayur asem (sweet and sour vegetable soup), sop iga sapi (beef rib soup) and kerak telor (spiced coconut omelette). Most of Betawi dishes are cooked in deep-fried, stir-fried, barbecued or braised methods, and feature a delicate balance of sweet, sour and salty flavours.

== Dishes ==
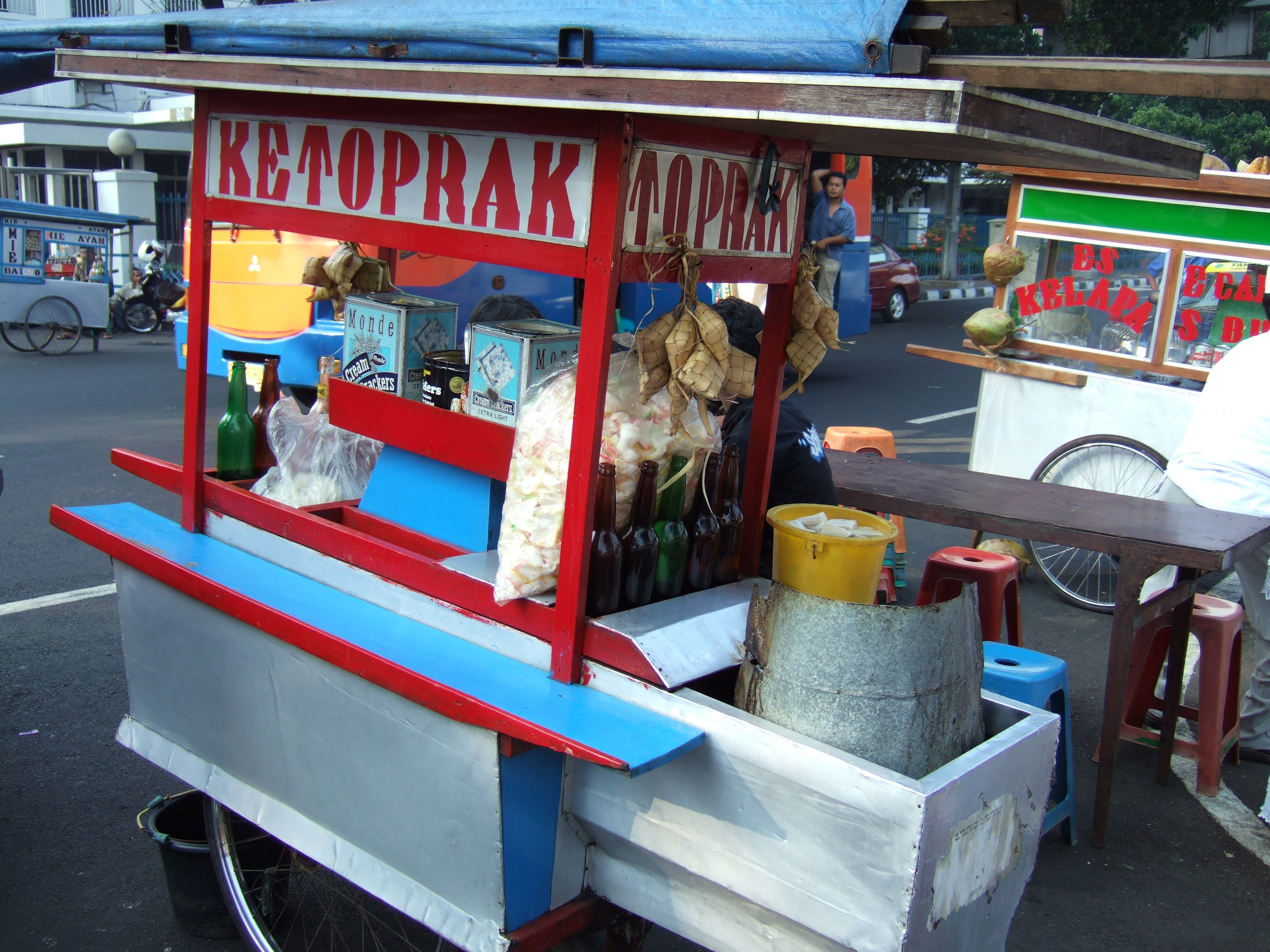
Ketoprak street vendor in Jakarta

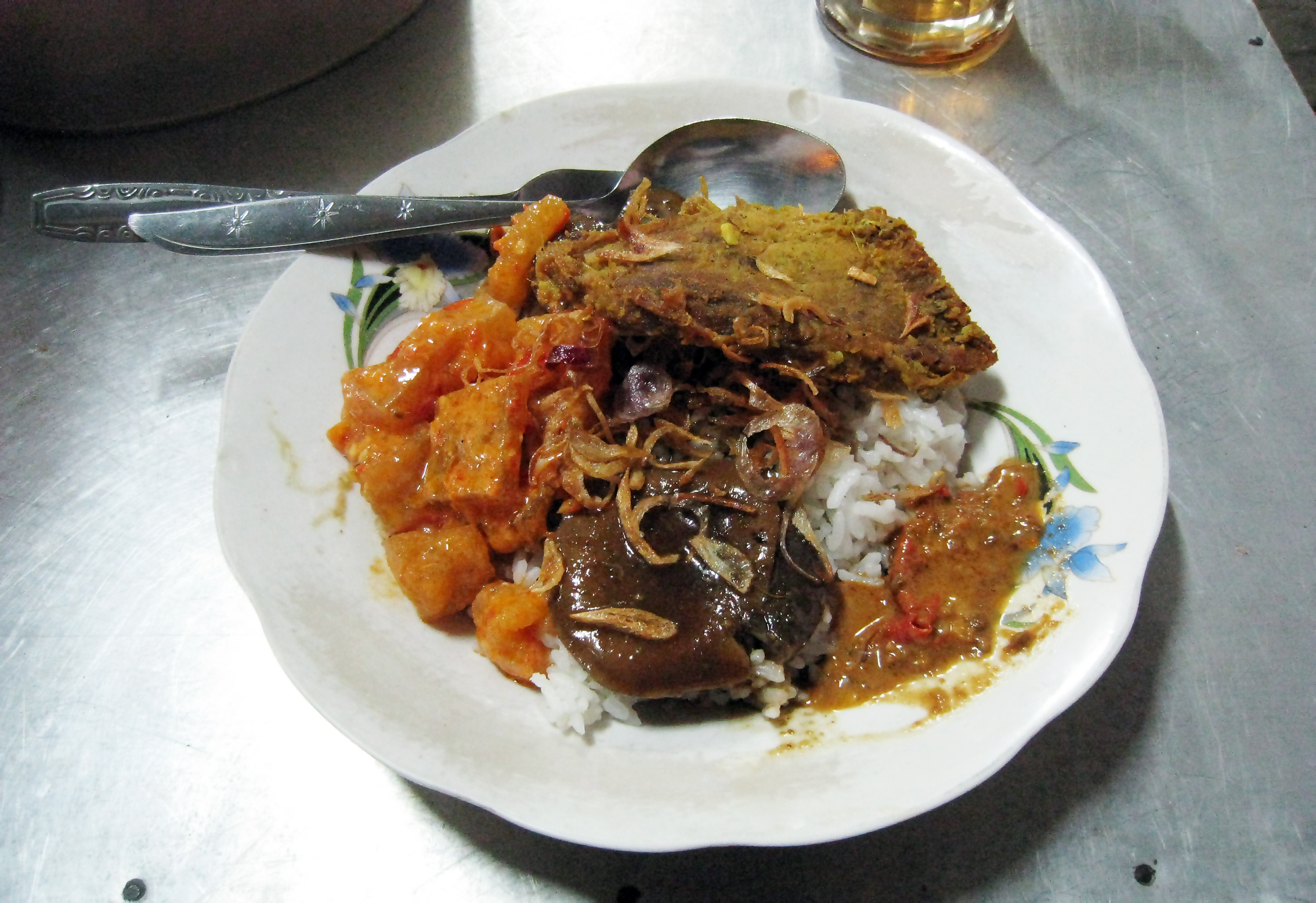
Nasi uduk with empal, krechek and semur jengkol

- Asinan betawi, a salad made from a mix of pickled vegetables, yellow noodles and sweet, sour and spicy peanut sauce, topped with a handful of rice crackers
- Bakcang, glutinous rice stuffed with meat and wrapped in bamboo leaf in triangular (more precisely, tetrahedral) form
- Bubur ayam (lit. chicken congee), rice congee with shredded chicken meat served with condiments and cakwe
- Empal, sweet and spicy fried beef
- Gado-gado, boiled or blanched vegetables salad in peanut sauce
- Kerak telor (lit. egg crust), a glutinous rice cake cooked with egg and served with shredded coconut and a dried shrimp topping
- Ketoprak, vegetables, tofu, rice vermicelli and rice cake in peanut sauce
- Ketupat, rice dumpling made from rice packed inside a diamond-shaped container of woven palm leaf pouch
- Ketupat sayur, ketupat compressed rice cake in spicy vegetables in thin coconut milk soup
- Lontong, pressed rice cake (dumpling) inside banana wrapping
- Lontong cap go meh, lontong in rich coconut milk with chicken opor ayam, liver in chilli, sayur lodeh, and telur pindang (marbled egg)
- Lontong sayur, almost identical to ketupat sayur, but uses lontong instead
- Laksa betawi, a Betawi laksa—the thick yellowish coconut milk based soup is a mixture of spices contains ground rebon or ebi (dried small shrimp), ketupat, vegetables, boiled egg, sprinkled with bawang goreng and often topped with emping cracker.
- Mi kangkung (lit. water spinach noodles), noodles with water spinach
- Nasi biryani, Betawi-style biryani—flavoured rice cooked or served with vegetables, mutton or chicken meat
- Nasi goreng domba, spicy fried rice with mutton meat, cooked in ghee
- Nasi goreng kambing, spicy fried rice with goat meat, cooked in ghee
- Nasi kebuli, Arab-origin spicy steamed rice cooked in goat broth, milk and ghee; similar to kabsa
- Nasi mandi, rice served with either roasted chicken, lamb or other meat.
- Nasi tim, steamed chicken rice served with chicken broth soup
- Nasi uduk, rice cooked in coconut milk, served with assortment of side dishes according to customer's choice; from eggs (hard boiled or omelette), tempeh, anchovy, to fried empal beef and fried chicken.
- Nasi ulam, rice with vegetables with side dishes.
- Pecak gabus, spiced snakehead fish
- Perkedel, fried patties, made of ground potatoes, minced meat, peeled and ground corn or tofu, or minced fish.
- Pesmol, spiced fish dish, usually carp or milkfish.
- Pindang bandeng, milkfish cooked in dark color, sweet and sour soup.
- Pindang serani, a fish dish with vegetables from Marunda.
- Roti buaya (lit. crocodile bread), crocodile-shaped bread.
- Roti gambang (lit. xylophone bread), rectangular shaped brown bread with sesame seeds, flavored with cinnamon and palm sugar. Usually served during Ramadan and other Betawi occasion.
- Rujak juhi, vegetables with shredded dried squid in peanut sauce.
- Rujak shanghai, preserved seafood and jellyfish with vegetables and sweet and sour sauce.
- Sapo tahu, soft tofu with vegetables, meat or seafood in a claypot.
- Sate kuah, beef satay served in rich and creamy spicy soup, akin to soto tangkar.
- Semur jengkol, a pungent-smelling bean stewed in a sweet soy sauce.
- Sayur asem, vegetables in tamarind soup.
- Sayur besan, vegetarian dish made of Saccharum edule.
- Sayur papasan, mixed vegetable soup.
- Soto betawi, beef offal soup with diced tomatoes and slices of fried potato.
- Soto kaki, beef or goat leg tendons and cartilage soto.
- Soto mi, spicy noodle soup dish that consists of yellow noodles and soto soup.
- Soto tangkar, soto made of chopped beef ribs.
- Tahu goreng, fried tofu with peanut sauce or sweet soy sauce with chopped chili.
- Tauge ayam, steamed chicken that served with bean sprouts and light soy sauce flavoured with oil.
- Tauge goreng, savoury vegetarian dish made of stir-fried bean sprouts with slices of tofu, ketupat or lontong rice cake and yellow noodles, served in a spicy oncom-based sauce

== Snacks and desserts ==
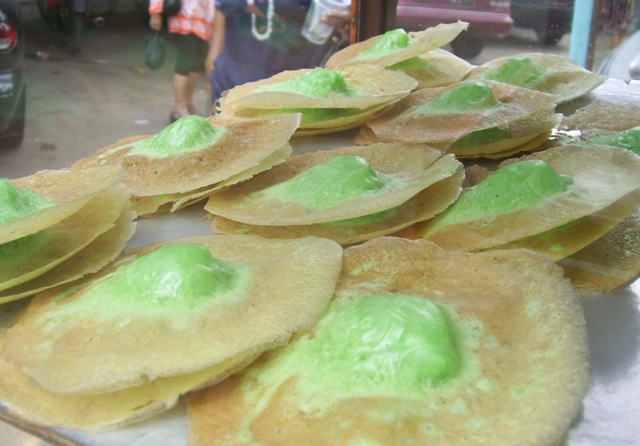
Kue ape or kue tete or serabi Jakarta.

- Bubur cha cha, dessert or breakfast dish made of pearled sago, sweet potatoes, yams, bananas, coconut milk, pandan leaves, sugar and salt. The ingredients are cooked in coconut milk, and the dish can be served hot or cold.
- Bubur sumsum, white congee made from rice flour and eaten with brown sugar sauce.
- Cakwe, cruller or fried long bread, served with sweet, sour and spicy dipping sauce.
- Cincau, grass jelly—jelly-like dessert.
- Dodol, a sticky confectionery made of coconut, glutinous rice and brown sugar
- Emping, bite-size snack kripik cracker, made of Gnetum gnemon nuts (which are seeds). Emping crackers have a slightly bitter taste.
- Geplak, sweets made from sugar and grated coconut.
- Kembang goyang (lit. shaking flower), traditional snack made of rice flour which is mixed with eggs, sugar, a pinch of salt and coconut milk. The dough can be fried after heating the oil and the kembang goyang mold.
- Kue ape, a soft-centered cake with a flimsy but crisp crust.
- Kue cubit (lit. pinch cake), traditional pancake that uses flour, baking powder, sugar and milk as its primary ingredients. This cake is related to poffertjes.
- Kue cucur, a pancake made of fried rice flour batter and coconut sugar.
- Kue gemblong, a rice flour dough covered in sticky brown coconut sugar.
- Kue ku, a small round or oval-shaped pastry with soft sticky glutinous rice flour skin wrapped around a sweet filling in the centre.
- Kue pancong, a sweet coconut hot cake.
- Kue pepe, a sticky, sweet layered cake made of glutinous rice flour.
- Kue putu, traditional cylindrical-shaped and green-colored steamed cake.
- Kue putu mayang, idiyappam-like rice noodles with a mixture of coconut milk and served with liquid palm sugar.
- Kue rangi, coconut waffle served with thick brown coconut sugar.
- Kue talam (lit. tray cake), traditional cake made of rice flour, coconut milk and sugar steamed in cake mold or cups.
- Lumpia jakarta, lumpia that usually being deep fried. Unlike Semarang lumpia that uses rebung (bamboo shoots), Jakarta lumpia uses jicama and served with spicy peanut sauce as a dipping sauce.
- Pastel de nata, an egg tart pastry dusted with cinnamon from Kampung Tugu—derived from Portuguese cuisine.
- Semprong, wafer snack made by clasping egg batter using an iron mold (waffle iron) which is heated up on a charcoal stove.
- Wajik, diamond-shaped compressed sweet glutinous rice cake.

== Beverages ==
- Bir pletok, a non-alcoholic drink made from the bark of the secang tree.
- Cendol, an iced sweet dessert that contains droplets of green rice flour jelly, coconut milk and palm sugar syrup.
- Es cincau, grass jelly drink served with shaved ice, coconut milk and sugar.
- Es selendang mayang, a sweet iced dessert made of kinca or liquid palm sugar, coconut milk, pandan leaf for aroma, ice and cakes made of glutinous rice flour or hunkwe (mung beans starch powder).
- Sekoteng, a warm beverage made of ginger and milk, poured with peanut, cubed bread, and pacar cina (tapioca pearls).

== Gallery ==
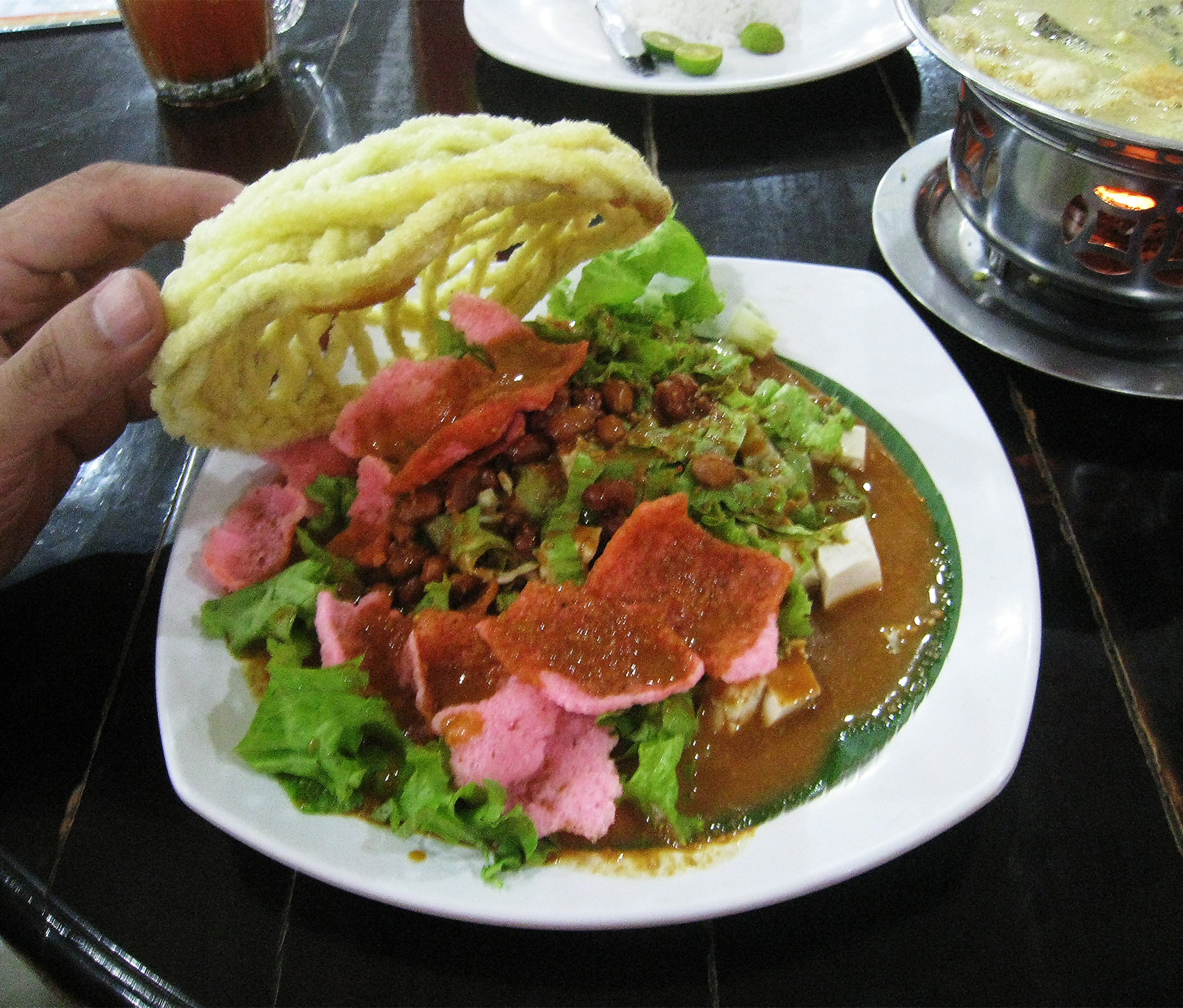
Asinan betawi, pickled vegetables in peanut sauce.

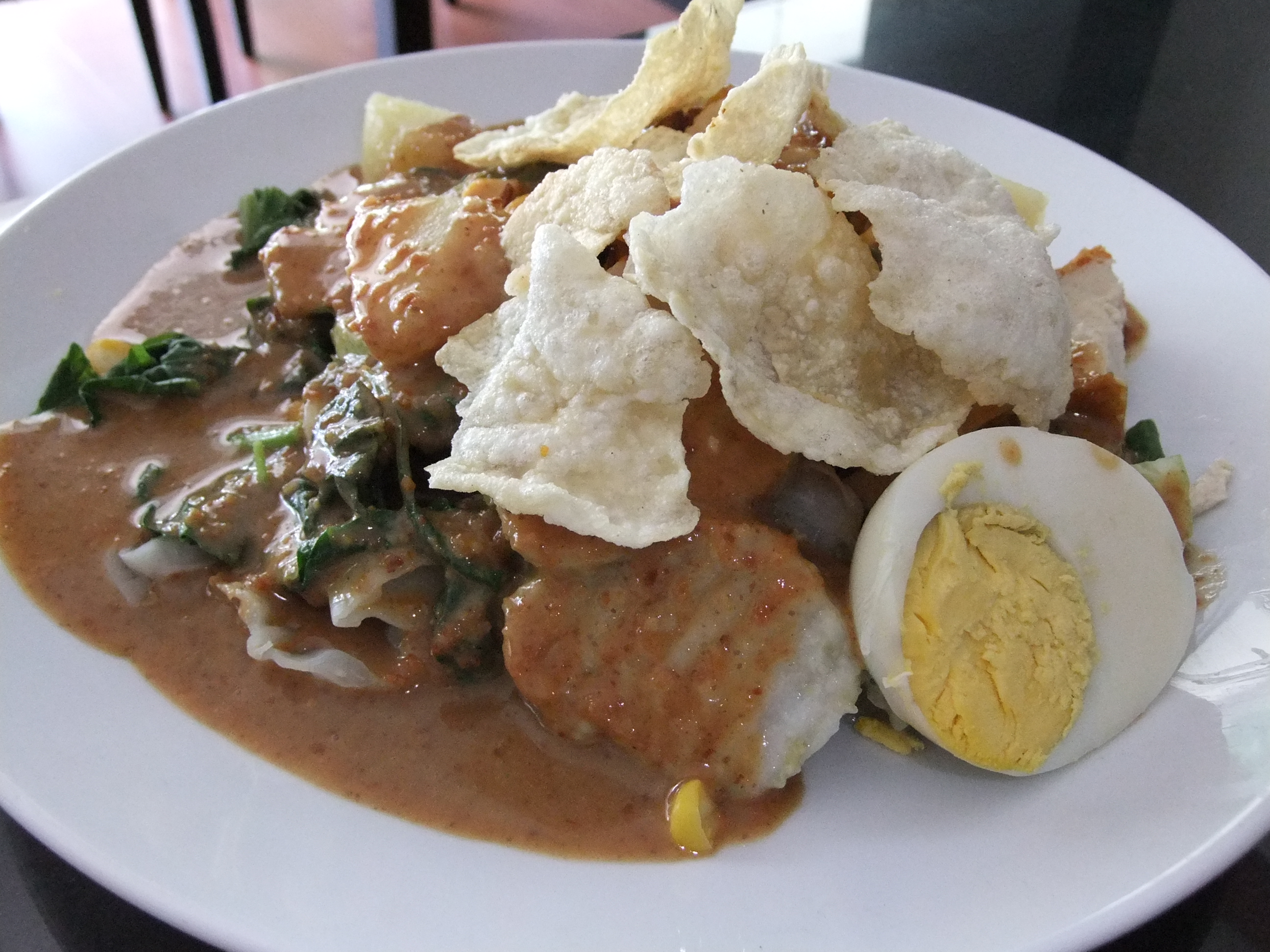
Gado-gado, vegetables in peanut sauce.

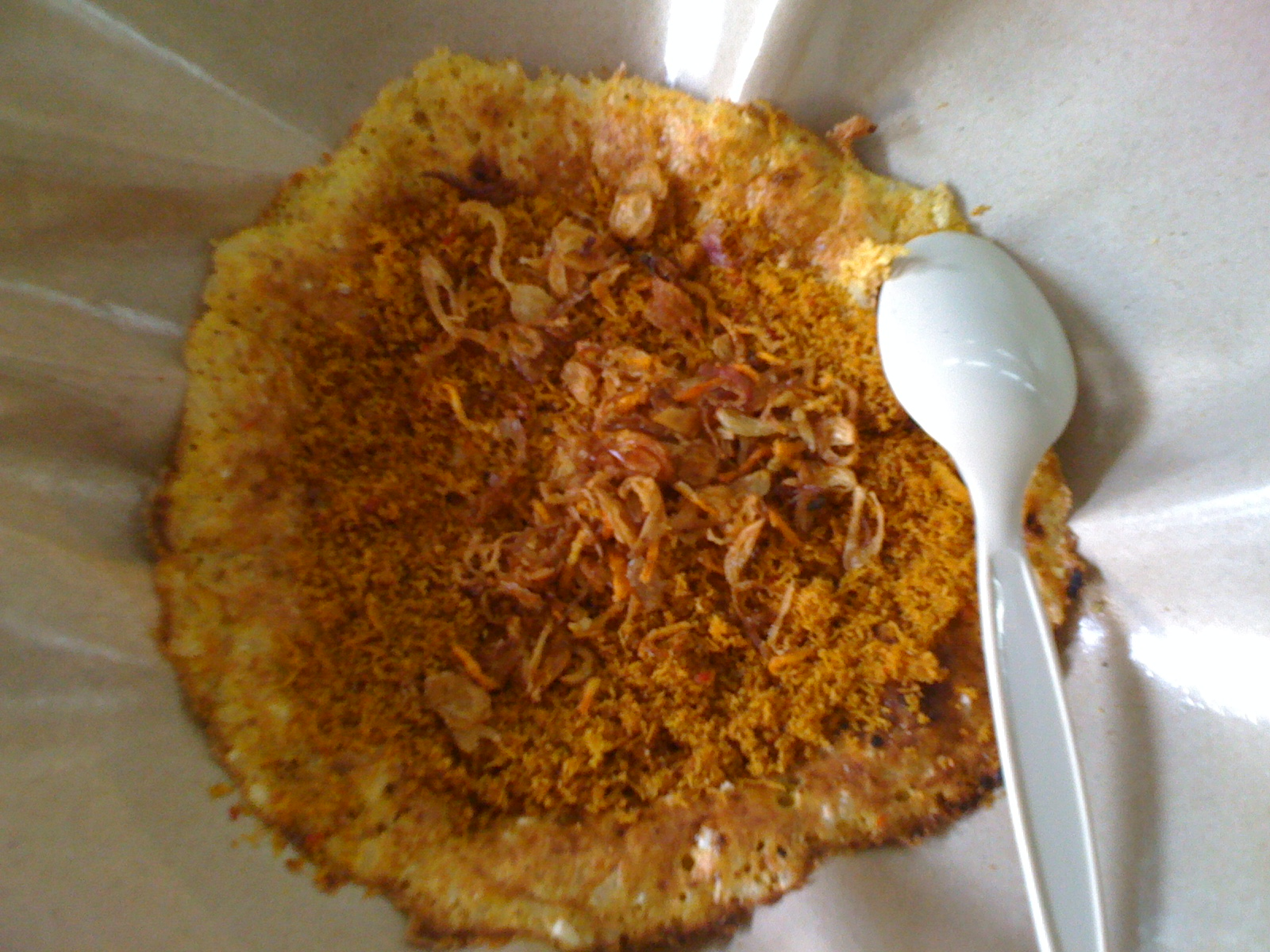
Kerak telor, spicy coconut omelette.

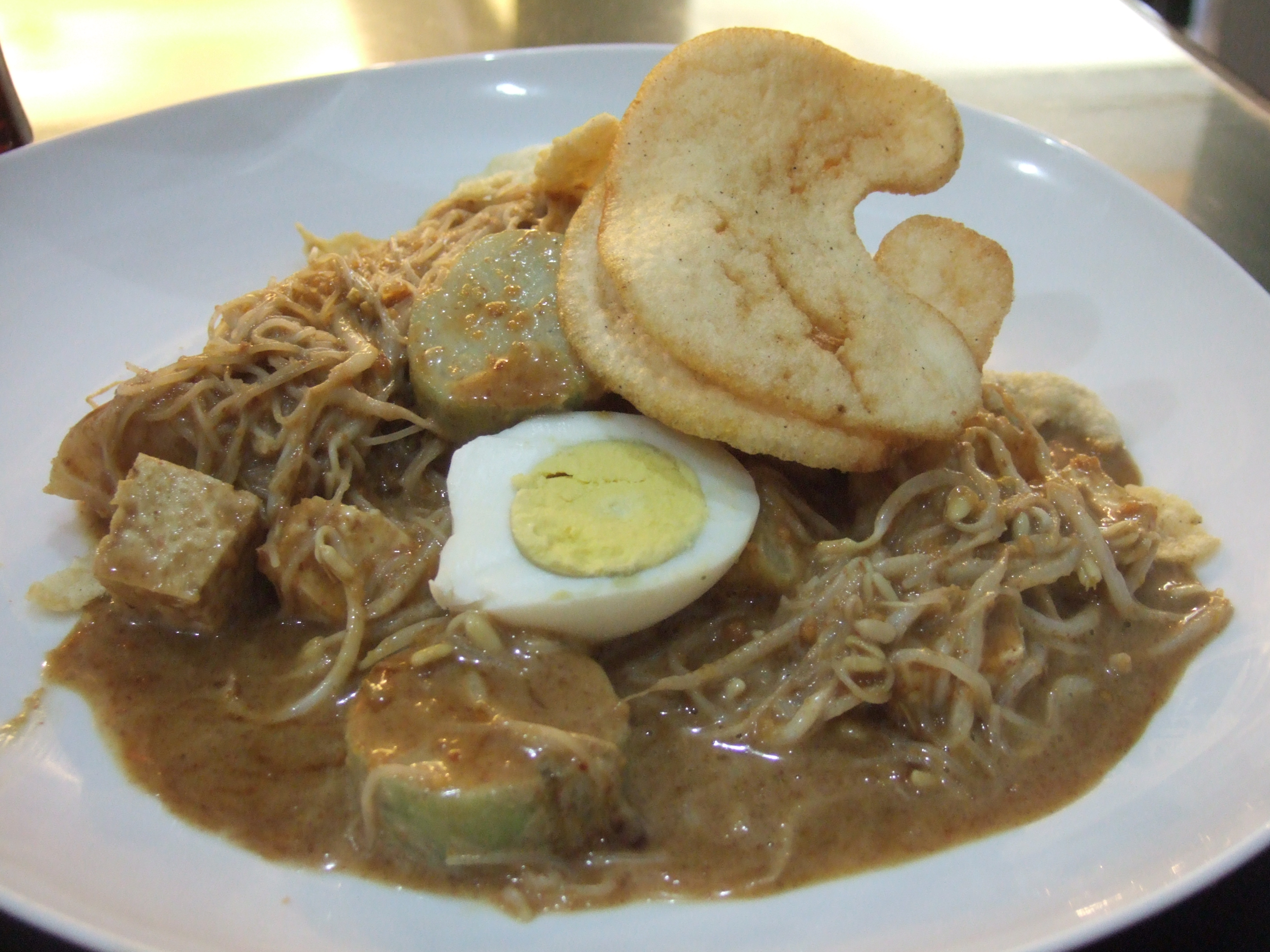
Ketoprak, vegetables, tofu, rice vermicelli and rice cake in peanut sauce.

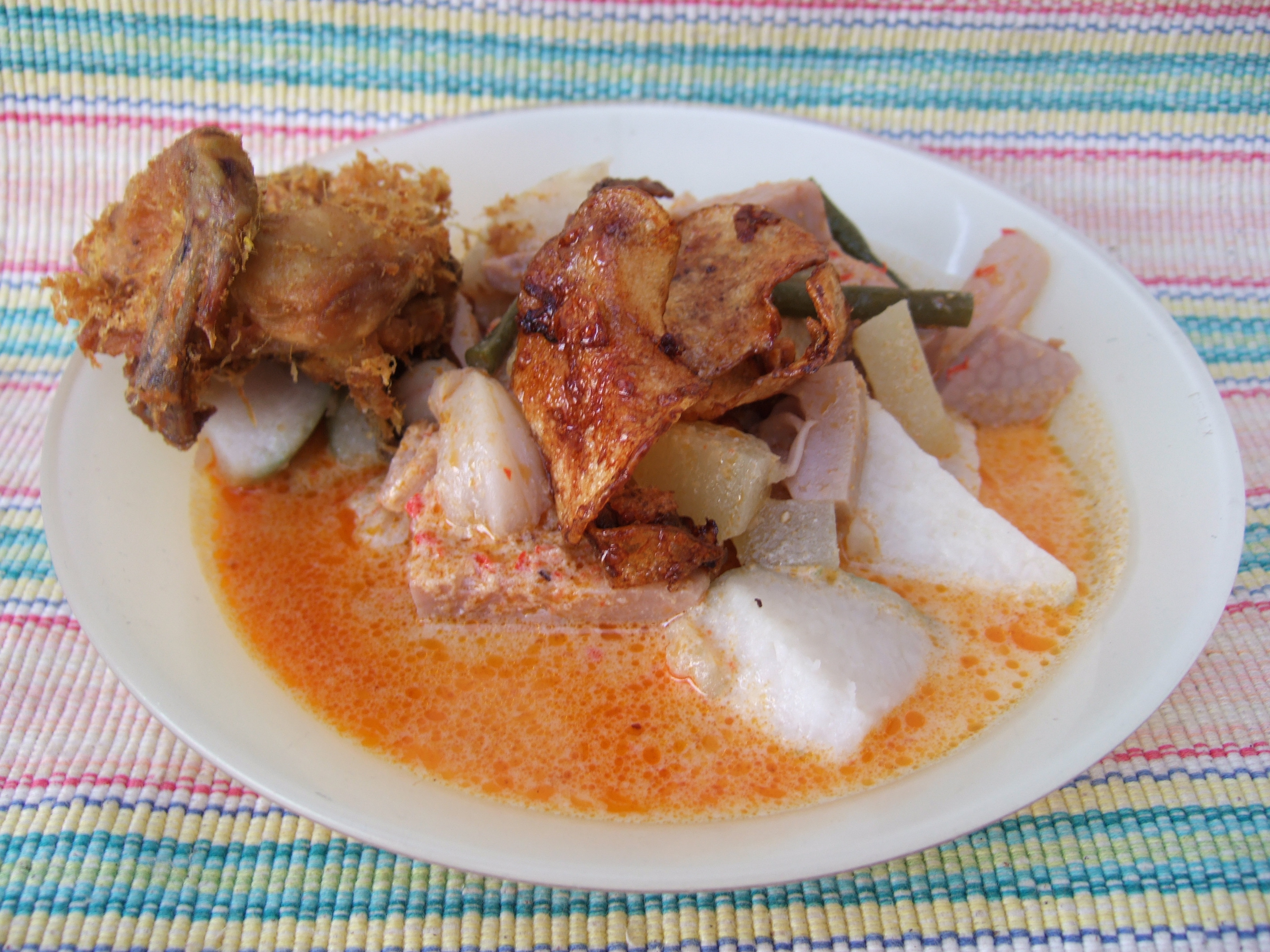
Ketupat sayur, ketupat rice cake in spicy vegetables soup.

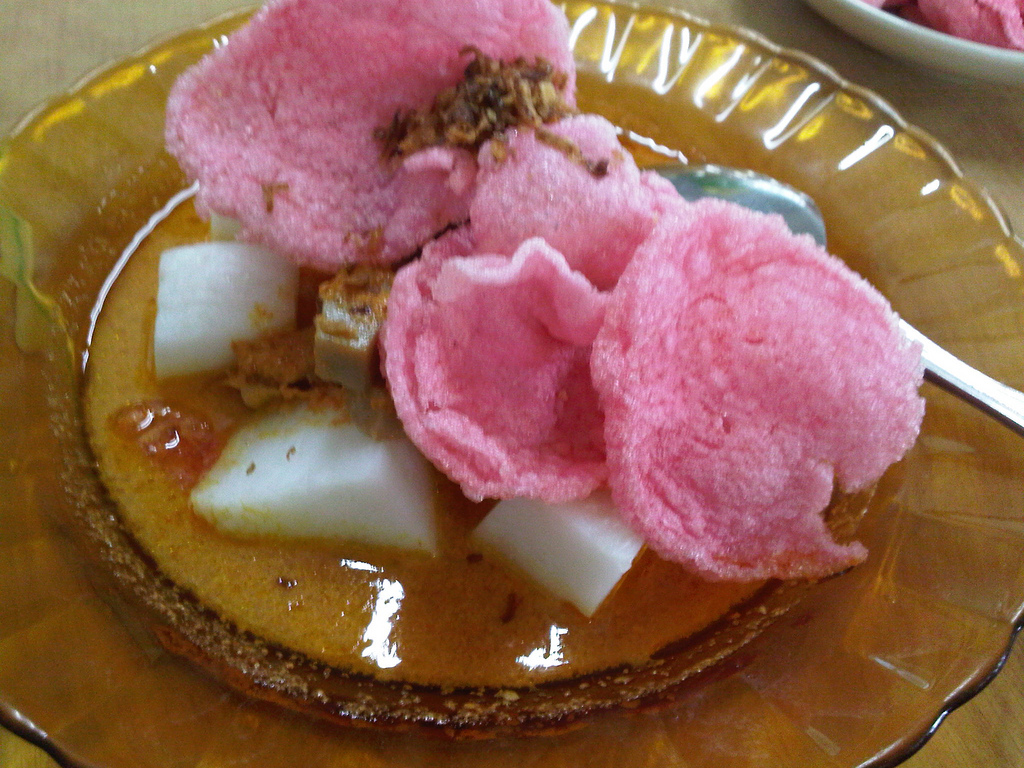
Lontong sayur.

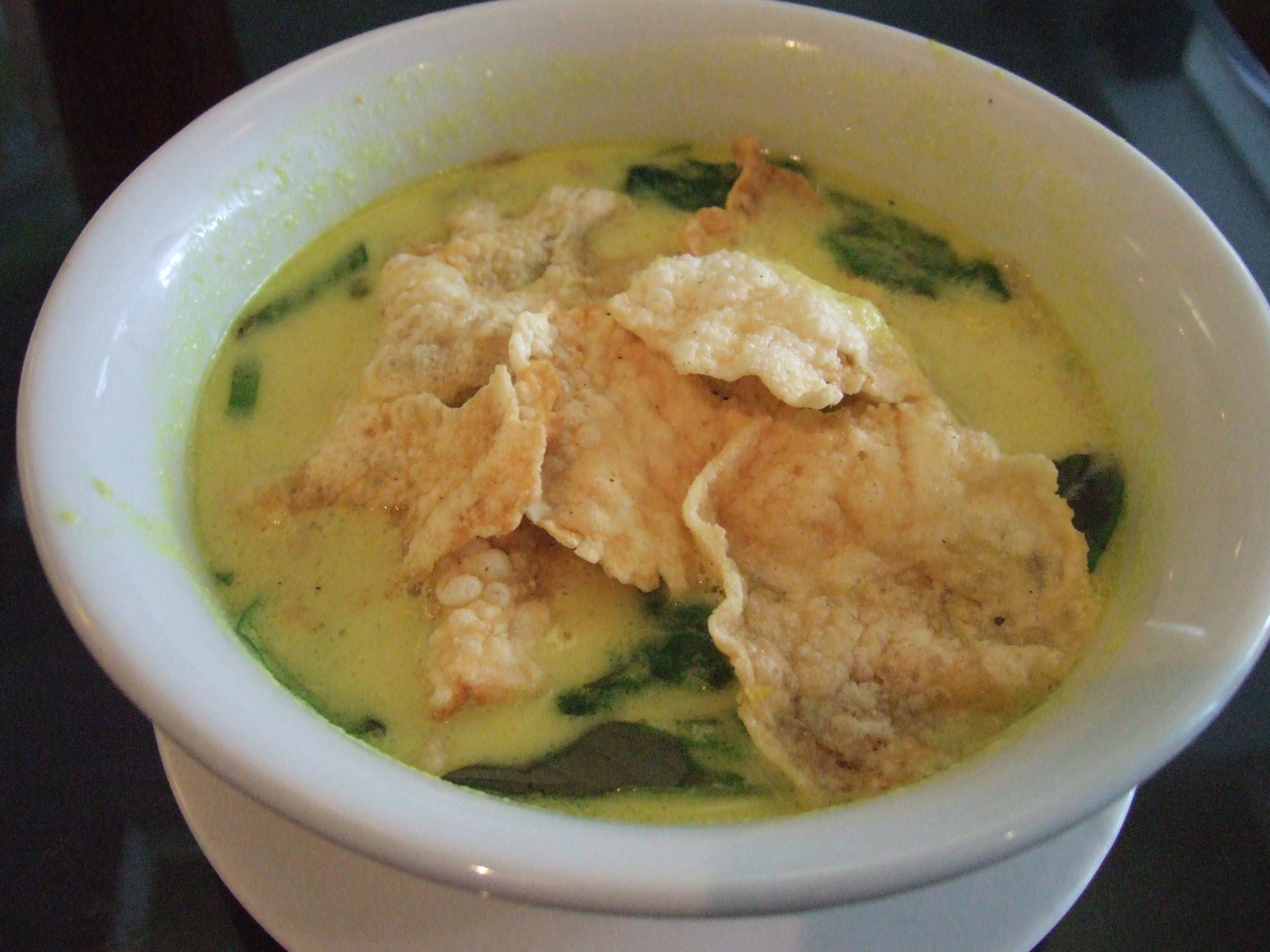
Laksa Jakarta style.

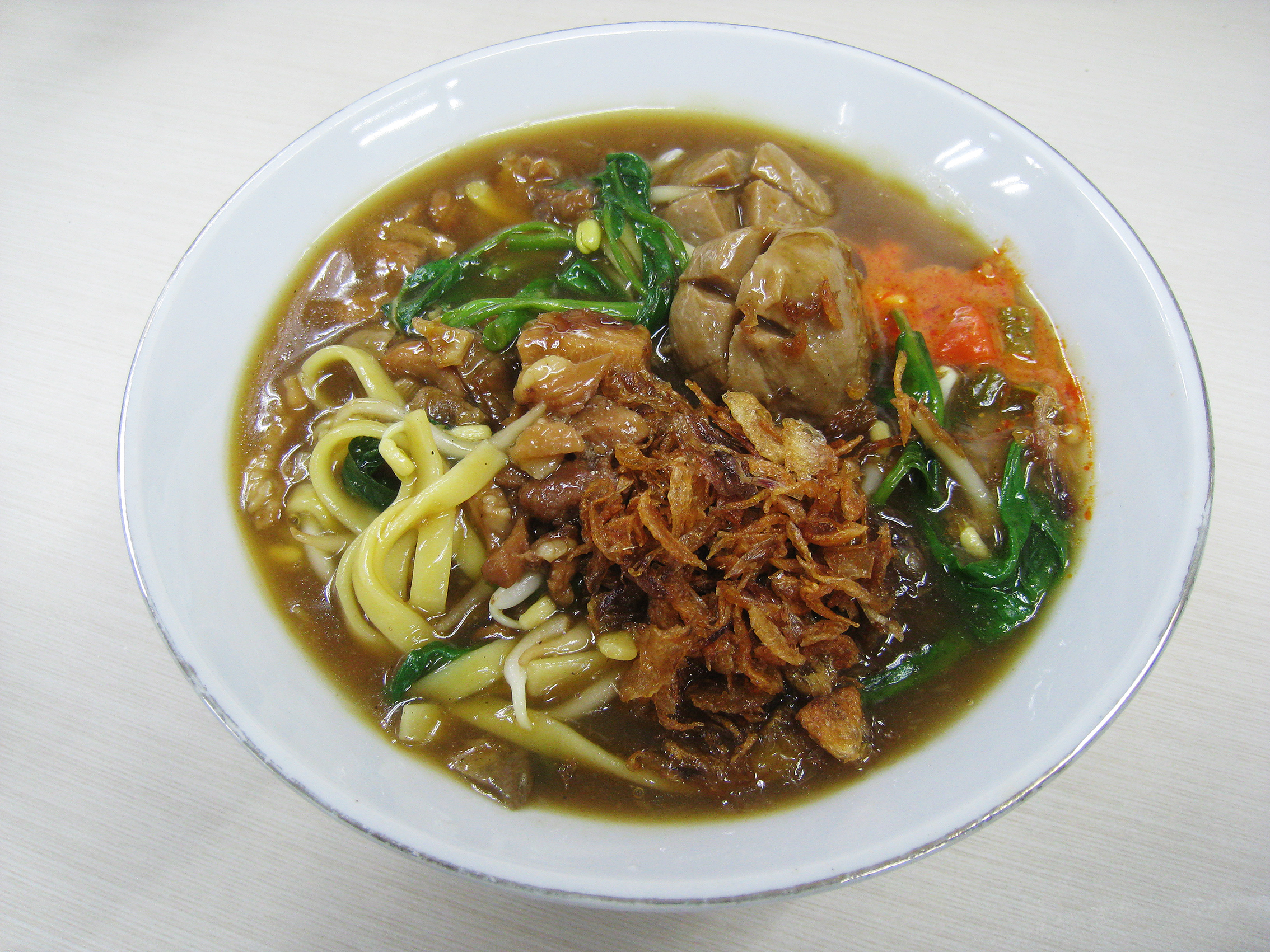
Mie kangkung, noodle with water spinach.

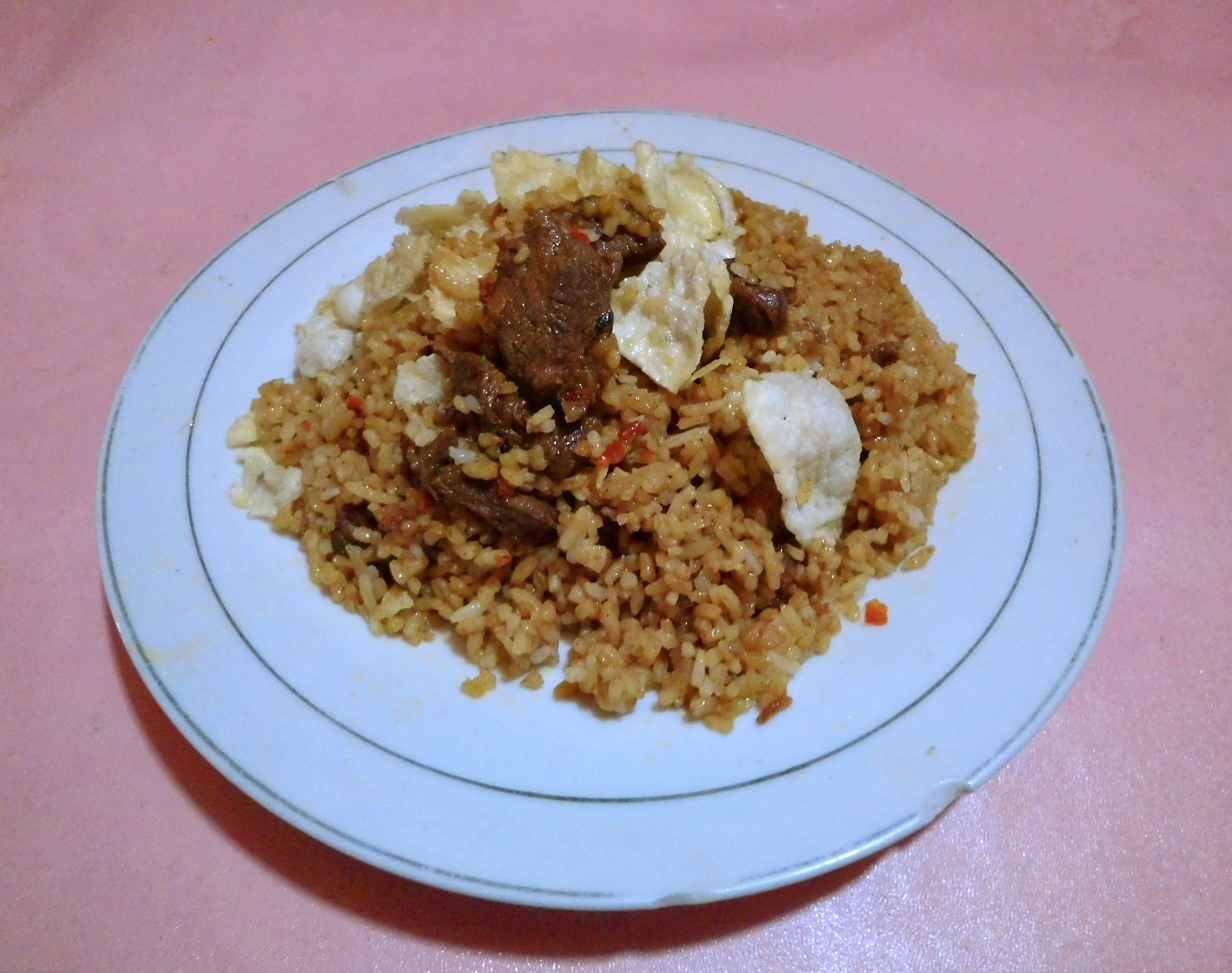
Nasi goreng kambing (goat meat fried rice) Kebon Sirih

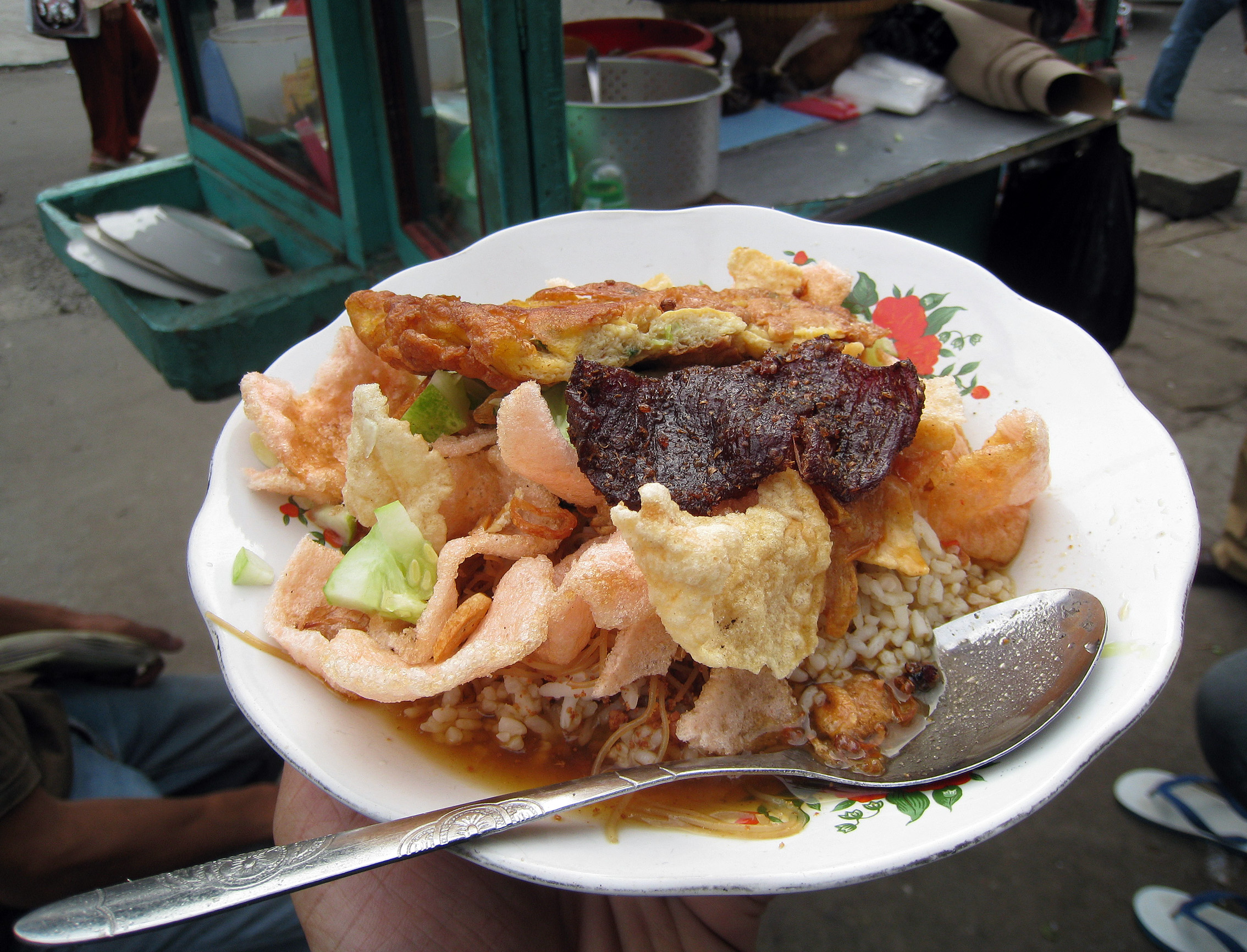
Nasi ulam Betawi.

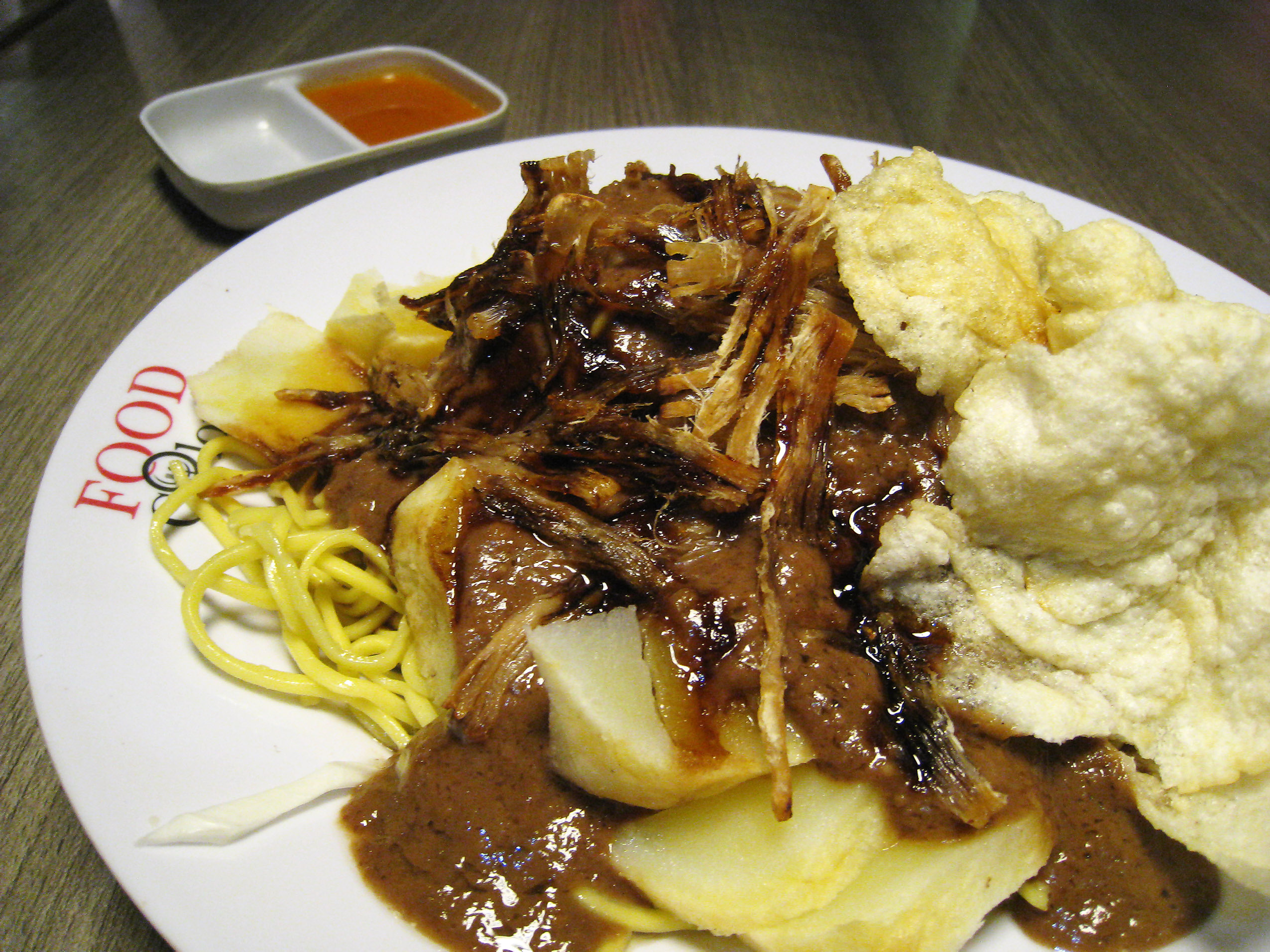
Rujak juhi.

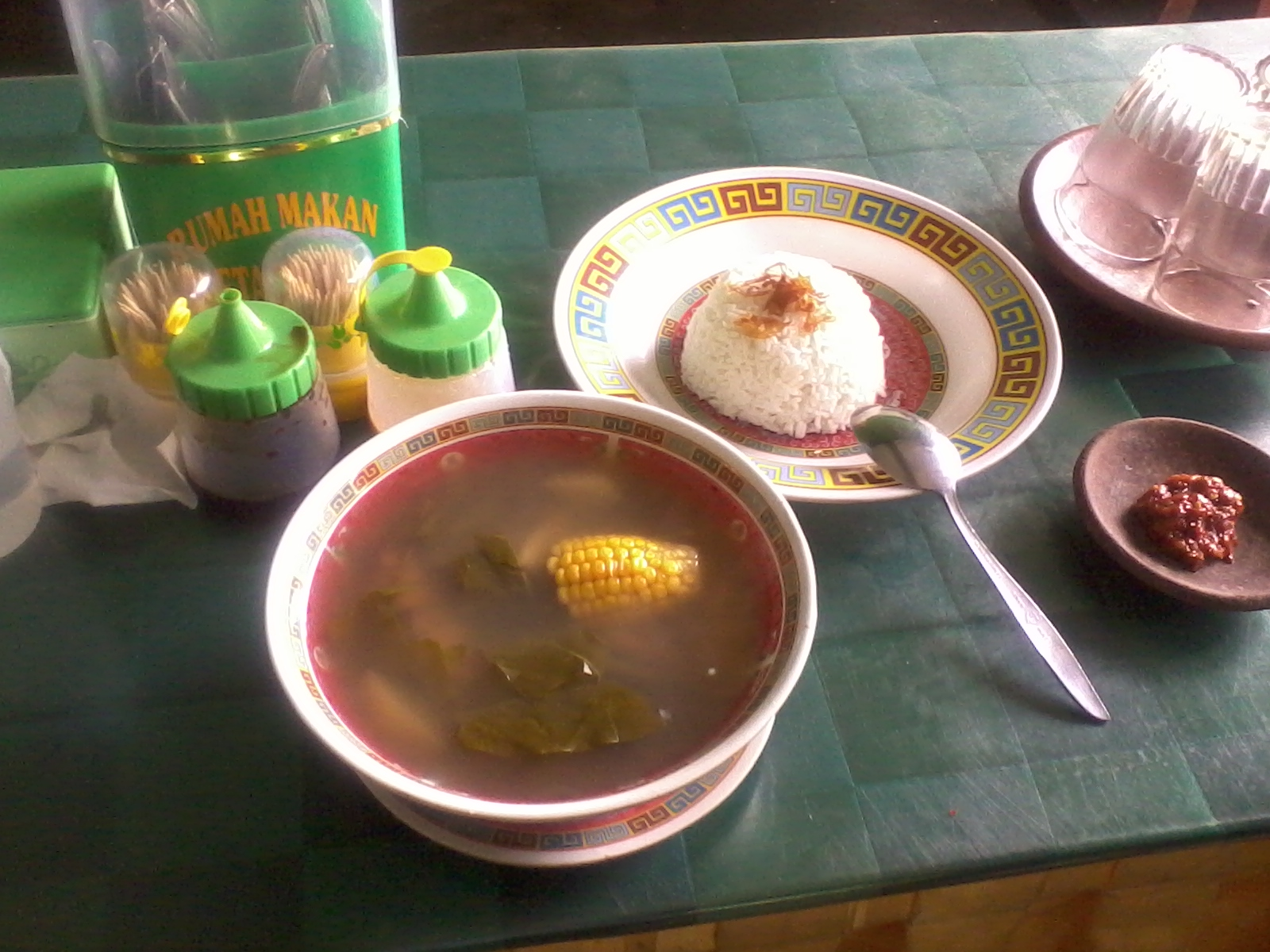
Sayur asem Betawi version.

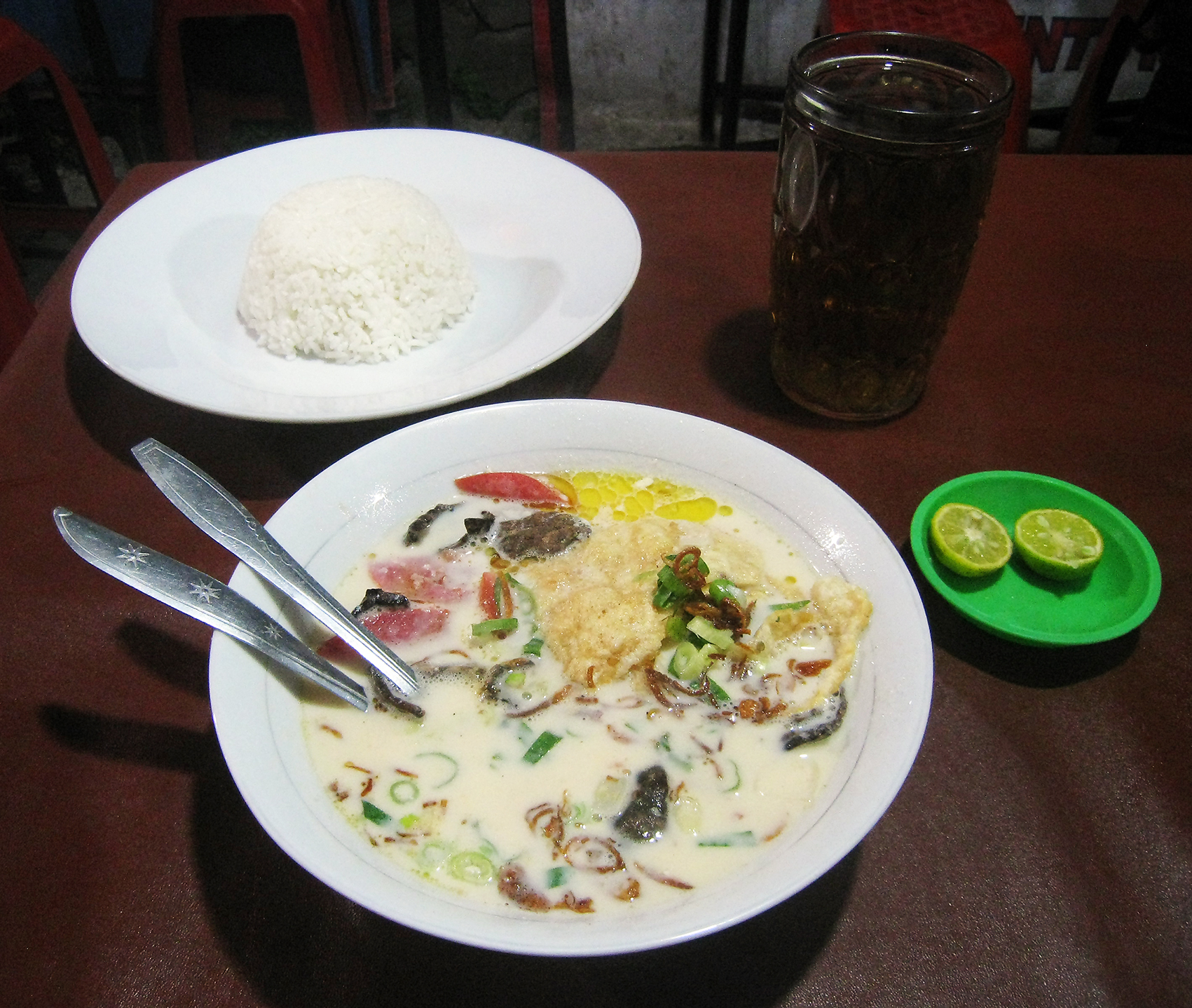
Soto betawi, a Betawi beef meat and offals in rich and creamy milk or coconut milk soup.

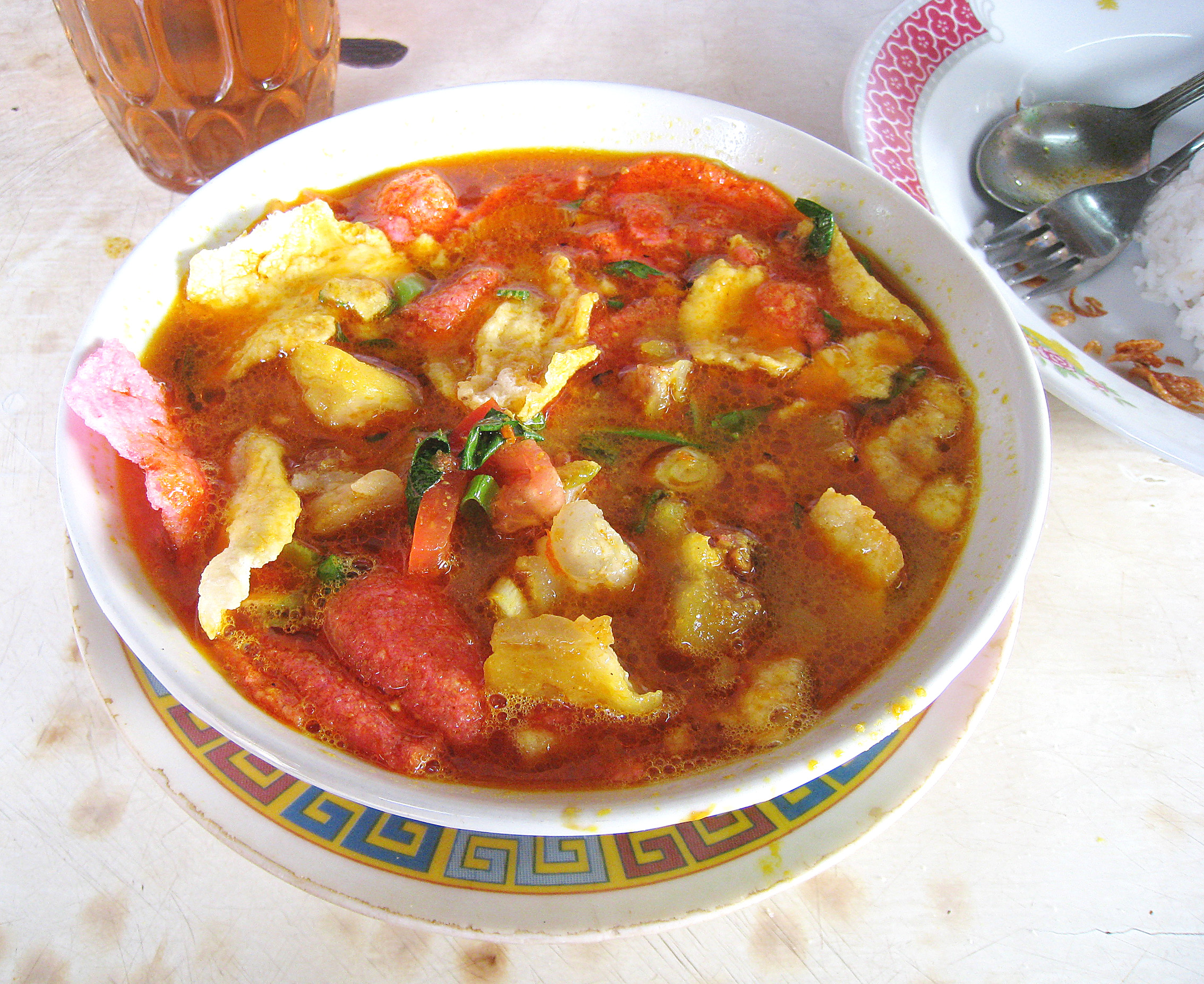
Soto kaki cow's foot tendons and cartilage soto, a Betawi specialty

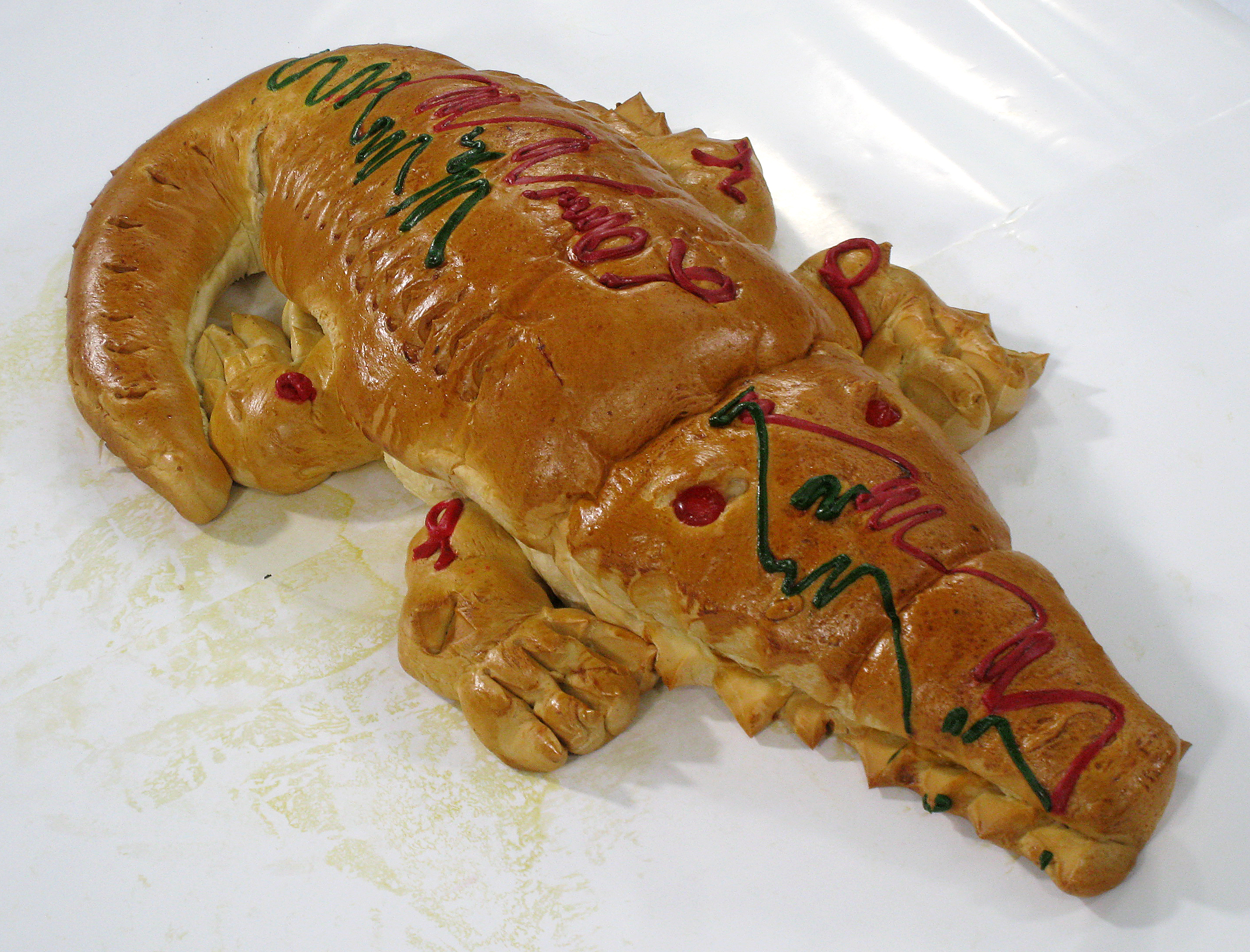
Roti buaya, crocodile-shaped bread is often served in festive occasions.

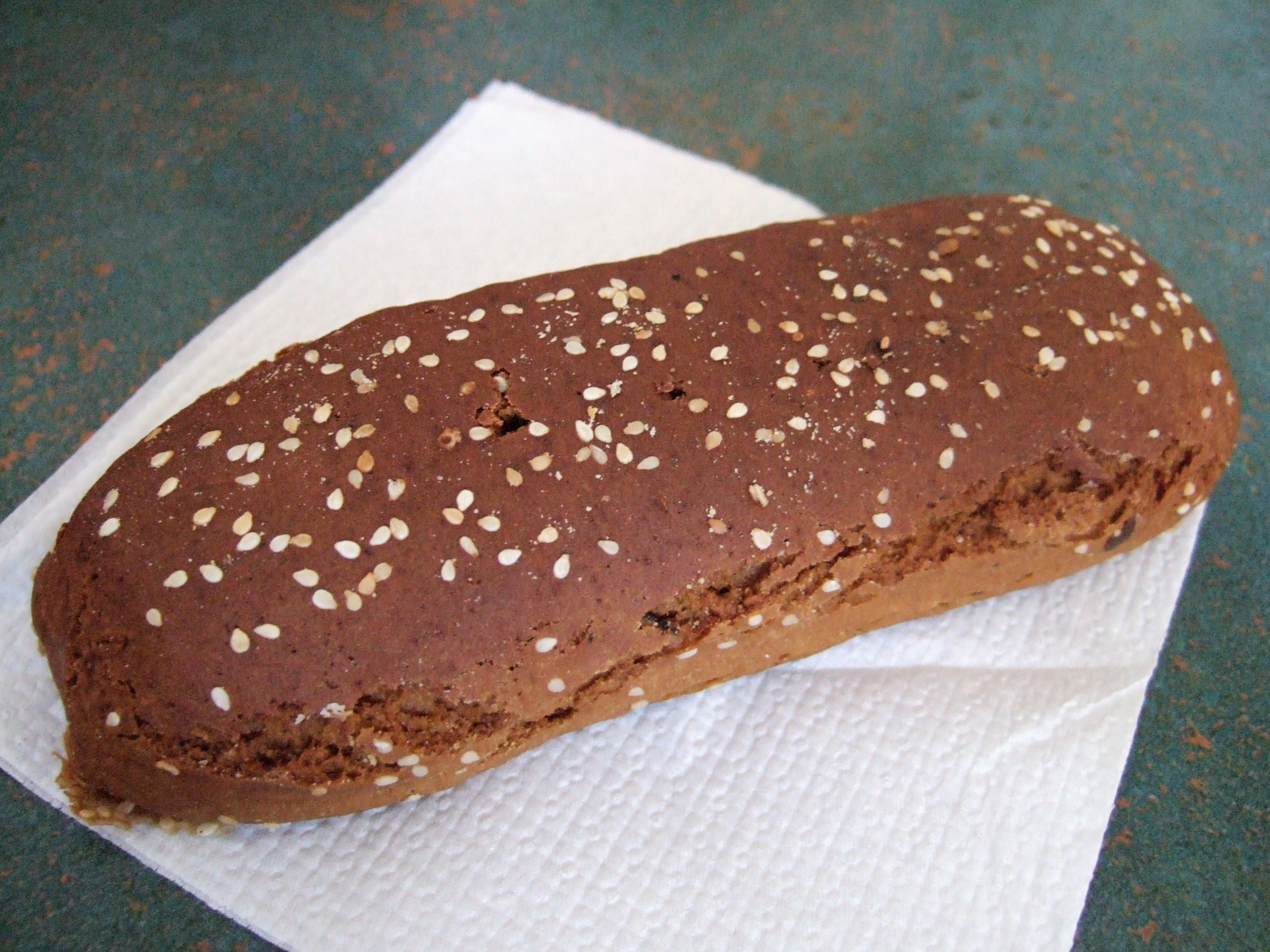
Roti gambang, xylophone-shaped bread with sesame seeds.

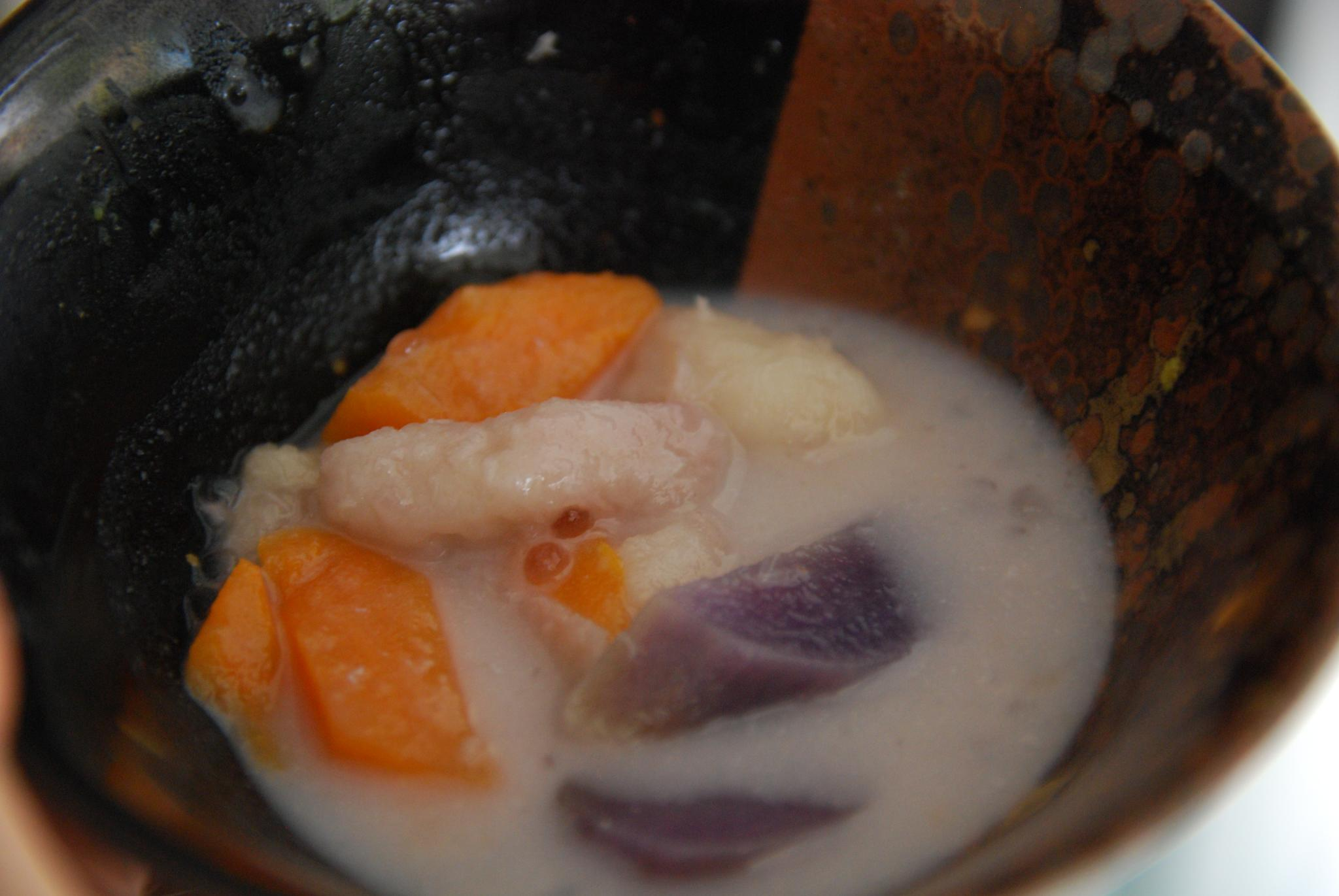
Bubur cha cha.

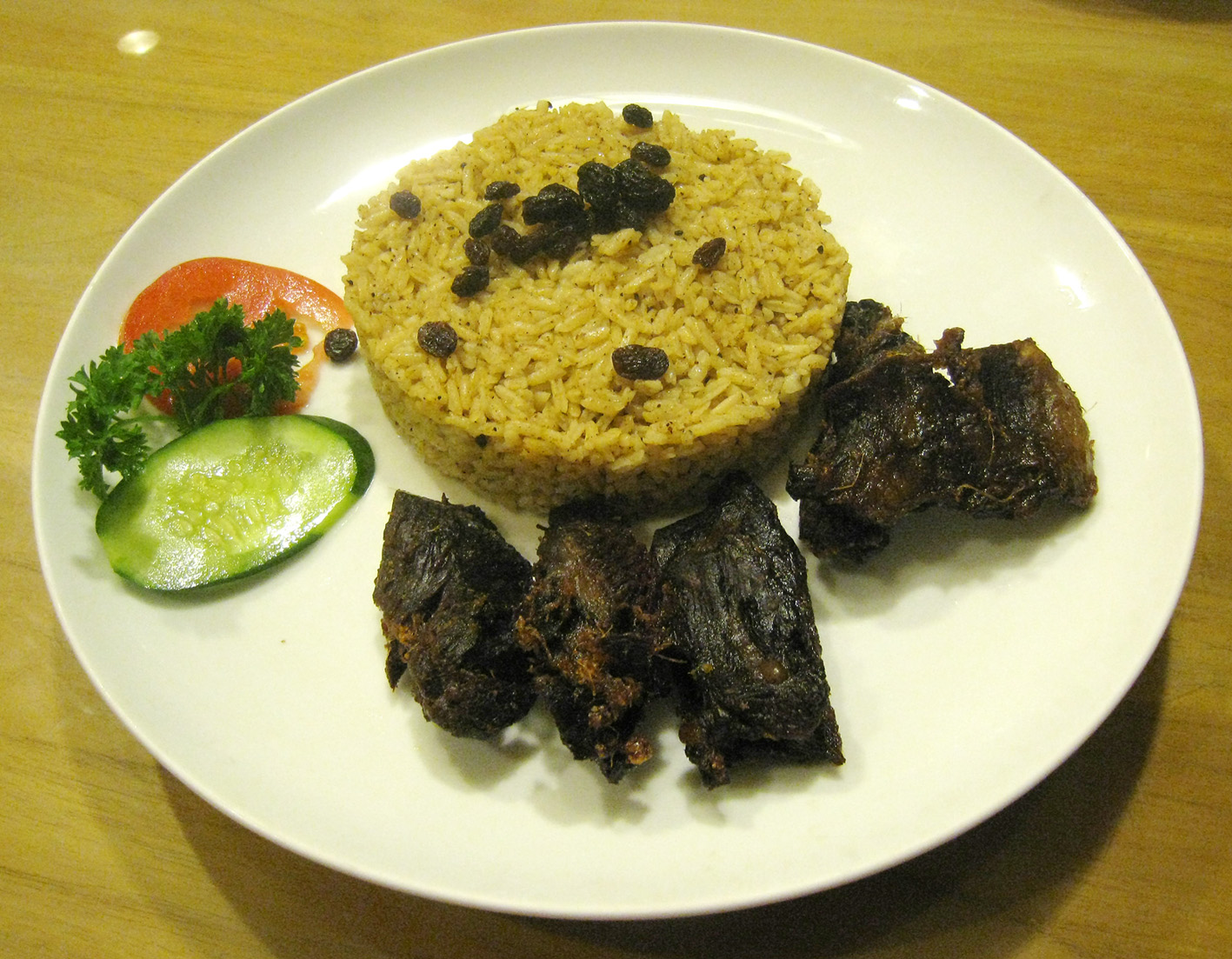
Nasi kebuli with goat meat.

== See also ==
- Indonesian cuisine
- Javanese cuisine
- Malay cuisine
- Peranakan cuisine
- Sundanese cuisine
