= Roti gambang =

Indonesian traditional bread

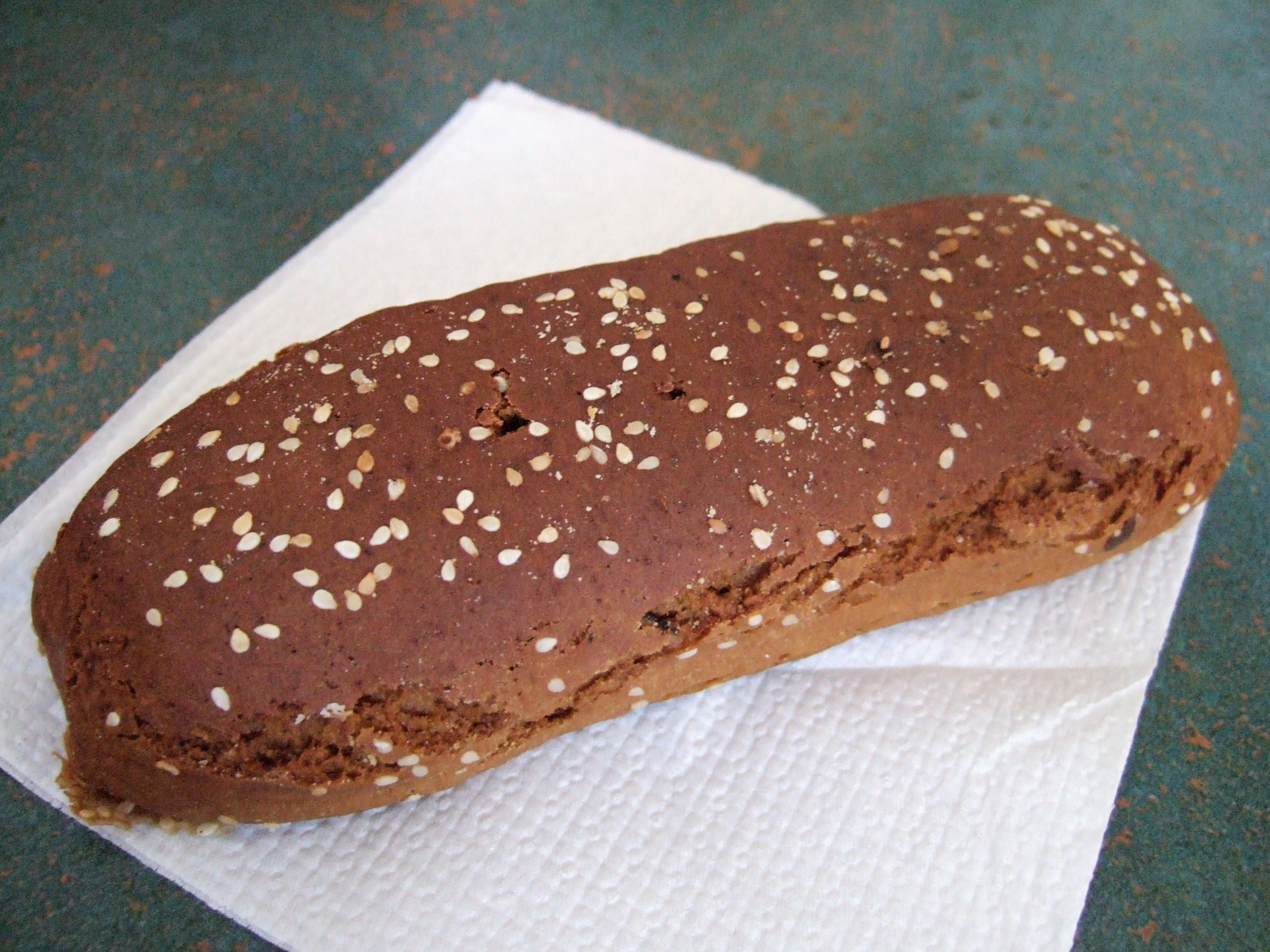
- Roti gambang, cinnamon bread sprinkled with sesame seeds.
- Alternative names: Ganjel rel (Javanese)
- Type: Bread
- Course: Breakfast, appetizer
- Place of origin: Indonesia
- Region or state: Jakarta and Semarang
- Created by: Betawi and Javanese

Roti gambang or ganjel rel (Javanese: ꦫꦺꦴꦠꦶꦒꦤ꧀ꦗꦼꦭ꧀ꦫꦺꦭ꧀, romanized: roti ganjel rel; Pegon: روتي غانجل رل) is an Indonesian rectangular-shaped brown bread with sesame seeds, flavoured with cinnamon and palm sugar.

Roti gambang is names as a Betawi traditional bread from Jakarta. Yet, it is also recognised as Javanese traditional bread as roti ganjel rel. This bread is typical Javanese bread and usually served during Dugderan, Ramadan, Eid ul-Fitr, and other Javanese occasion. Roti gambang originates from Jakarta and Semarang, Central Java.

This bread was listed on the 50 best breads in the world by CNN 2019.

== Etymology ==
The term gambang is a Betawi term refer to gambang, a xylophone-like wooden or metal bars used as musical instrument as commonly found in Betawi gambang kromong orchestra, as well as in gamelan orchestra. This naming was because the similarity of its shape with gambang bars. Its Javanese name however, roti ganjel rel (lit. "rail support bread") refer to wooden railroad tie, again to describe its similarity to rail tie that secured the rail upon the ballast.

== See also ==
- Cuisine of Indonesia
- Javanese cuisine
- List of Indonesian dishes
- List of Indonesian snacks

Other Indonesian breads:

- Roti buaya
- Roti canai
- Roti jala
- Roti naan
- Roti tisu
