= Bubur cha cha =

Southeast Asian traditional dessert and breakfast dish

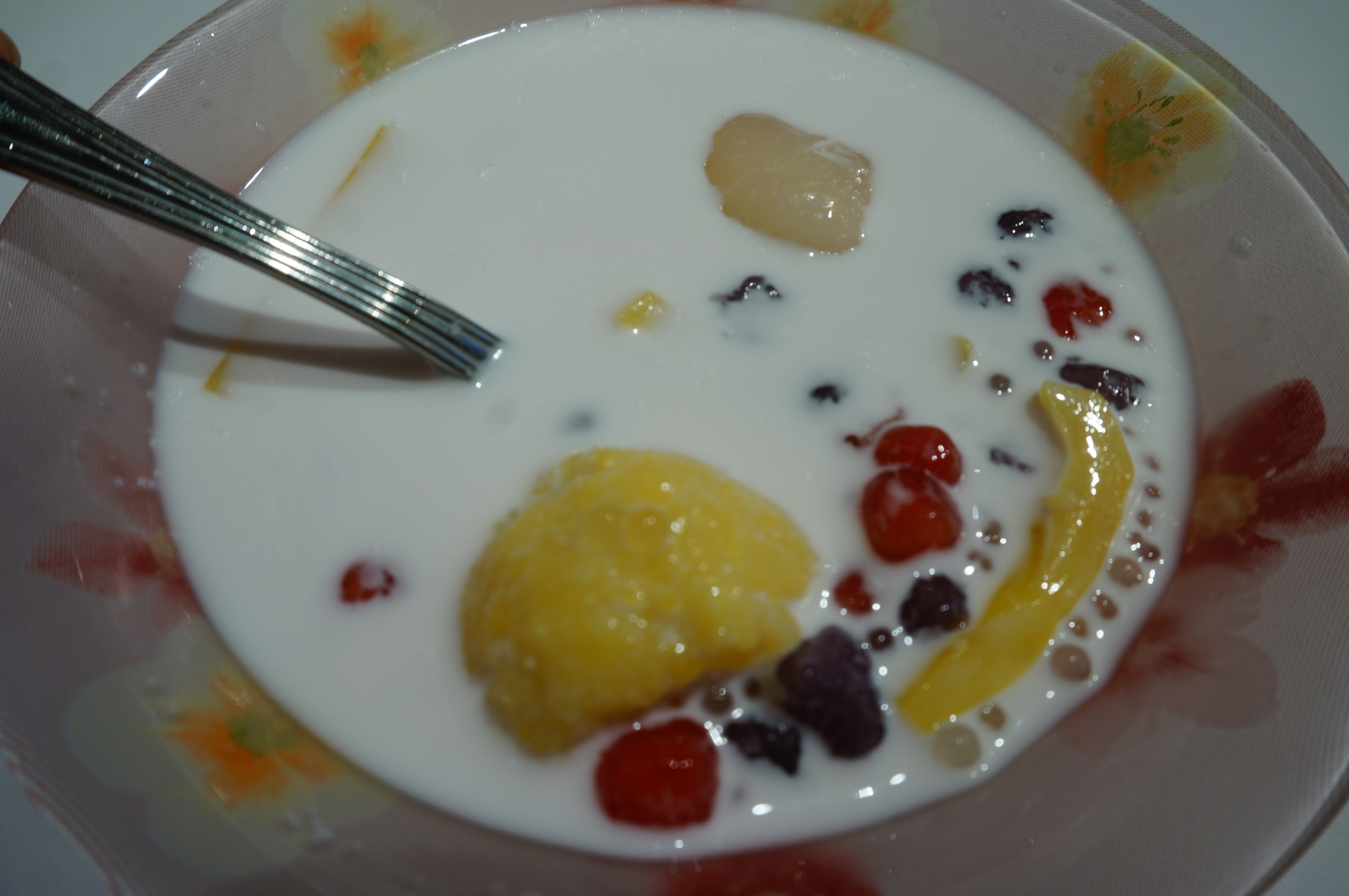
- Alternative names: Bubur cha-cha
- Course: Dessert (breakfast)
- Place of origin: Brunei, Indonesia, Malaysia, Singapore and Thailand
- Region or state: Maritime Southeast Asia
- Created by: Betawis, Malays and Peranakans
- Serving temperature: Hot or cold
- Other information: Thai people of Chinese descent in Phuket and Phang Nga brought this dessert from Malaysia. In Thailand, it is referred to as dubo jiajie. (ตู่โบ้เจียะเจียะ)

Bubur cha cha, also spelled as bubur cha-cha or dubo jiajie, is a Betawi and Malay dessert and breakfast dish in Indonesian cuisine, Malaysian cuisine, Singaporean cuisine and Phuket cuisine (Thailand) prepared using pearled sago, sweet potatoes, yams, bananas, coconut milk, pandan leaves, sugar and salt. Grated coconut, coconut cream and water can be used as additional ingredients. The ingredients are cooked in coconut milk, and the dish can be served hot or cold. Bubur cha cha is also sold as a street food in many parts of Southeast Asia. (Note: "The happy memories of Bubur Cha-Cha include the joyous strains of the hawker shouting "Ooh-aah chay chay" as he came down the street.")

== See also ==
- Indonesian cuisine
- Malaysian cuisine
- Phuket cuisine
- Singaporean cuisine
- Thai cuisine
- List of desserts
- Betawi cuisine
- Malay cuisine
- Peranakan cuisine
- Bubur kacang hijau
- Bubur ketan hitam
- Bubur pedas
- Bubur sumsum
