= Kerak telor =

Indonesian spicy omelet dish

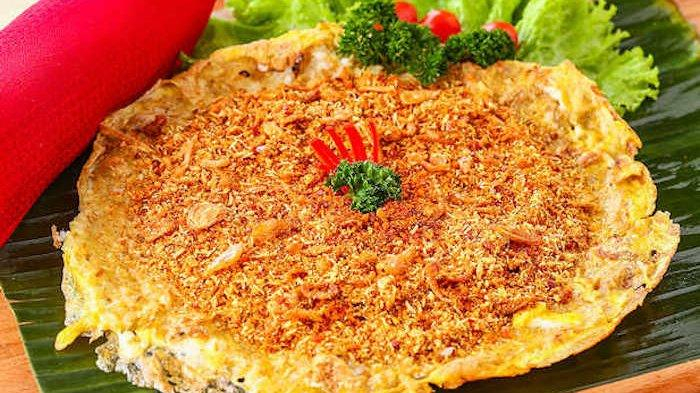
- Course: Snack
- Place of origin: Indonesia
- Region or state: Greater Jakarta
- Serving temperature: Hot
- Main ingredients: Spicy omelet of duck or chicken egg mixed with glutinous rice, sprinkled with serundeng coconut granules and fried shallots

Kerak telor (English: Egg crust) is a Betawi traditional spicy omelet dish from Indonesia. It is made from glutinous rice cooked with egg and served with serundeng (fried shredded coconut), fried shallots, and dried shrimp as toppings. Kerak telor is considered a snack and not a main dish. The dish has become popular at the annual Jakarta Fair.

== Preparation ==
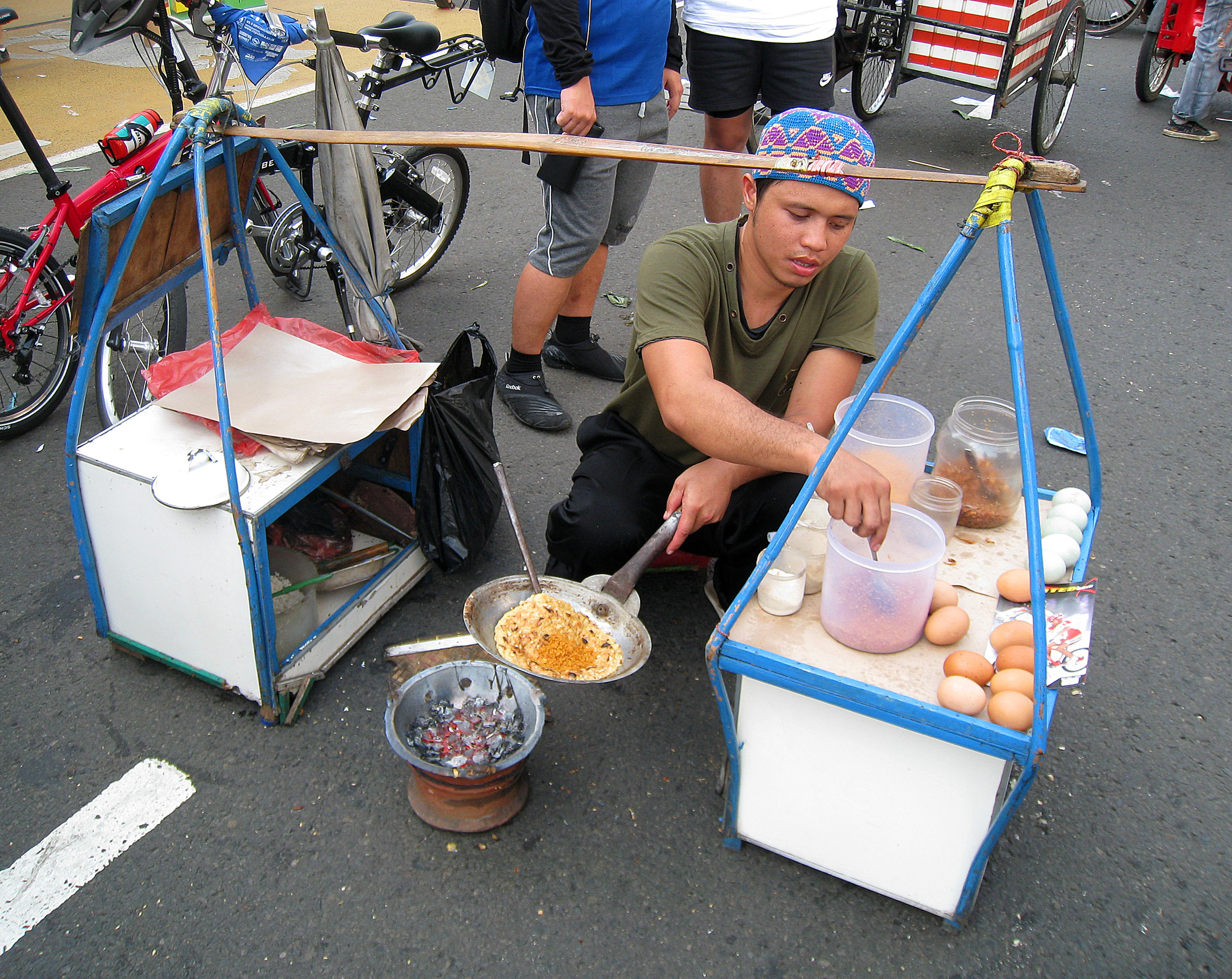
Kerak telor vendor in Jakarta, Indonesia

Kerak telor is made freshly in front of customers. A small amount of glutinous rice is placed on a small wok and heated over a charcoal fire. Then, an egg (either chicken or duck) is added and mixed in with spices. No cooking oil is used, so the omelet sticks to the wok and allows the vendor to hold it upside down toward the fire, until it is cooked. Afterward, serundeng, dried salted shrimp, and fried shallots are sprinkled on top.

== History ==
Kerak telor originates from the Dutch colonial era, when the quality of glutinous rice was poor, and eggs and other toppings were added to make it more palatable.

== See also ==
- List of Indonesian dishes
