= Phuket cuisine =

Culinary traditions of Phuket, Thailand

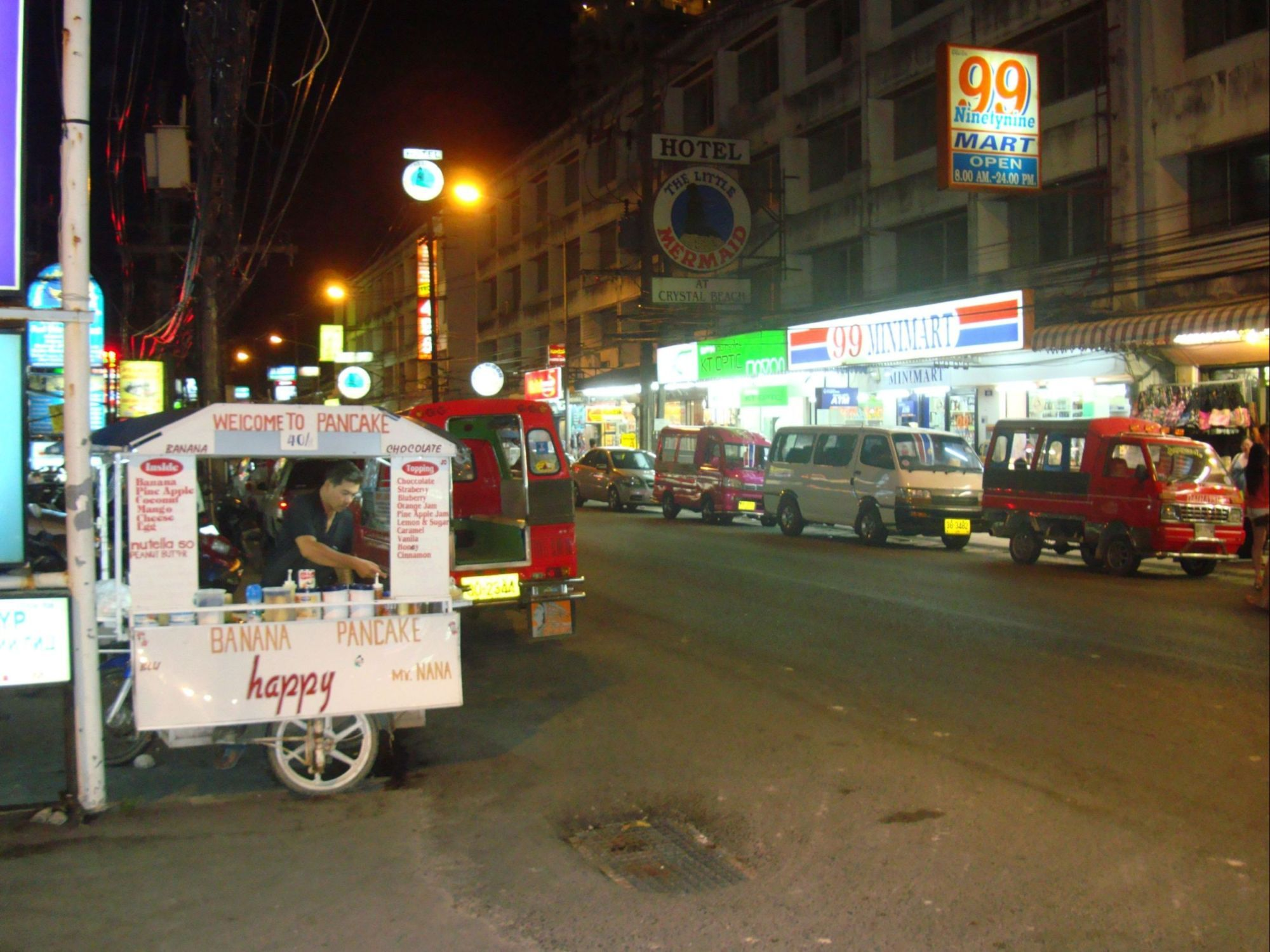
A street vendor purveying pancakes on Patak Road in Phuket City

Phuket cuisine originates from Phuket, Thailand and has Chinese, Malaysian, and Thai influences.

== Dishes ==
=== Bee-Pang ===
Bee-Pang is a crispy and crunchy type of rice cut into a solid rectangle with sweet sauce and is a type of cereal bar. Bee-Pang is made from puffed rice mixed with fried garlic topped with sweet sauce to blend with the salt from the rice. People in Phuket usually eat this with tea in the afternoon such as white tea or green tea due to tradition.

=== Gaang sôm blah ===
Gaang sôm plah is a fish curry dish. It is prepared without the use of coconut milk.

=== Kanohm Jin ===
Kanohm Jin is a tasty noodle dish made from rice or fish and topped with sauces. Sauces include Tai-Pla sauce, nam phrik sauce, and Namya sauce. It is usually eaten for breakfast with fried Pah Tong Go and curried fish. Kanohm Jin is served with more than 10 kinds of fresh vegetables.

=== Lo Bah ===
Lo Bah is deep fried pork organ served with fried tofu and a sweet and spicy sauce.

=== Mee Hoon Pa Chang ===
Mee Hoon Pa Chang consists of noodles fried in soy sauce, topped with fried onion and accompanied by pork soup. The recipe was originated by ‘Pa Chang’, so local people call the dish ‘Mee Hoon Pa Chang’.

=== Moo Hong ===
Moo Hong is a stewed pork dish from Fujian cuisine. It is usually served with rice or boiled rice and served as the main meal. Pork belly is the main ingredient of the dish, but other cuts of pork can be used to balance the ratio between meat and fat. The dish also contains dark soy sauce and sugar for a sweet taste and garlic, pepper, and coriander roots for a strong flavor. Light soy sauce can be used for a more salty taste. The dish is garnished with fresh coriander. "Moo Palo" is similar to "Moo Hong” but Moo Palo contains Chinese five-spice.

=== Oh Tao ===
Oh Tao is a hot fried oyster or seafood dish prepared with eggs, flour, bean sprouts and taro root. It can be seasoned with salt, sugar, chili or vinegar. It is usually eaten with bean sprouts and crispy pork. Oh Tao is one of the most ancient dishes of the area.

=== Pàt tai ===
Pàt tai is a stir-fried noodle dish prepared using a curry paste typically containing chili peppers, tamarind, shrimp paste and sugar.

== Snacks ==
=== Ah-pong ===
Ah-pong is a pancake considered the signature snack of Phuket. An adaptation of the South Indian appam, it is easy to make as the ingredients—flour, egg yolk, coconut milk, sugar, water and yeast—are readily available. It has a delicious, light sweet aroma from coconut milk.

=== Ang-Gu ===
Ang-Gu is a popular sweet snack usually eaten with coffee or tea. From Chinese belief, turtles are the symbol of eternity so they believe that those who eat this snack will live endlessly like the turtles. This snack is made from glutinous rice flour, vegetable oil, sugar and gold nuts.

=== Bee-go-moi ===
Bee-go-moi is a snack made of black, wet sticky rice with coconut milk. It has an interesting texture and flavor from the glutinous black sticky rice and the saltiness of the coconut milk.

== Desserts ==
=== O-aew ===
O-aew is a dessert originating from Phuket and considered to be the region's signature dessert. It is made from jellied banana-flour mixed with boiled red beans, ice, and sweet red syrup. Extra jellies and fruit are added to sweeten the dish.

== See also ==
- List of Thai dishes
- List of Thai ingredients
- List of Thai restaurants
