= Asinan =

Indonesian pickled vegetable or fruit dish

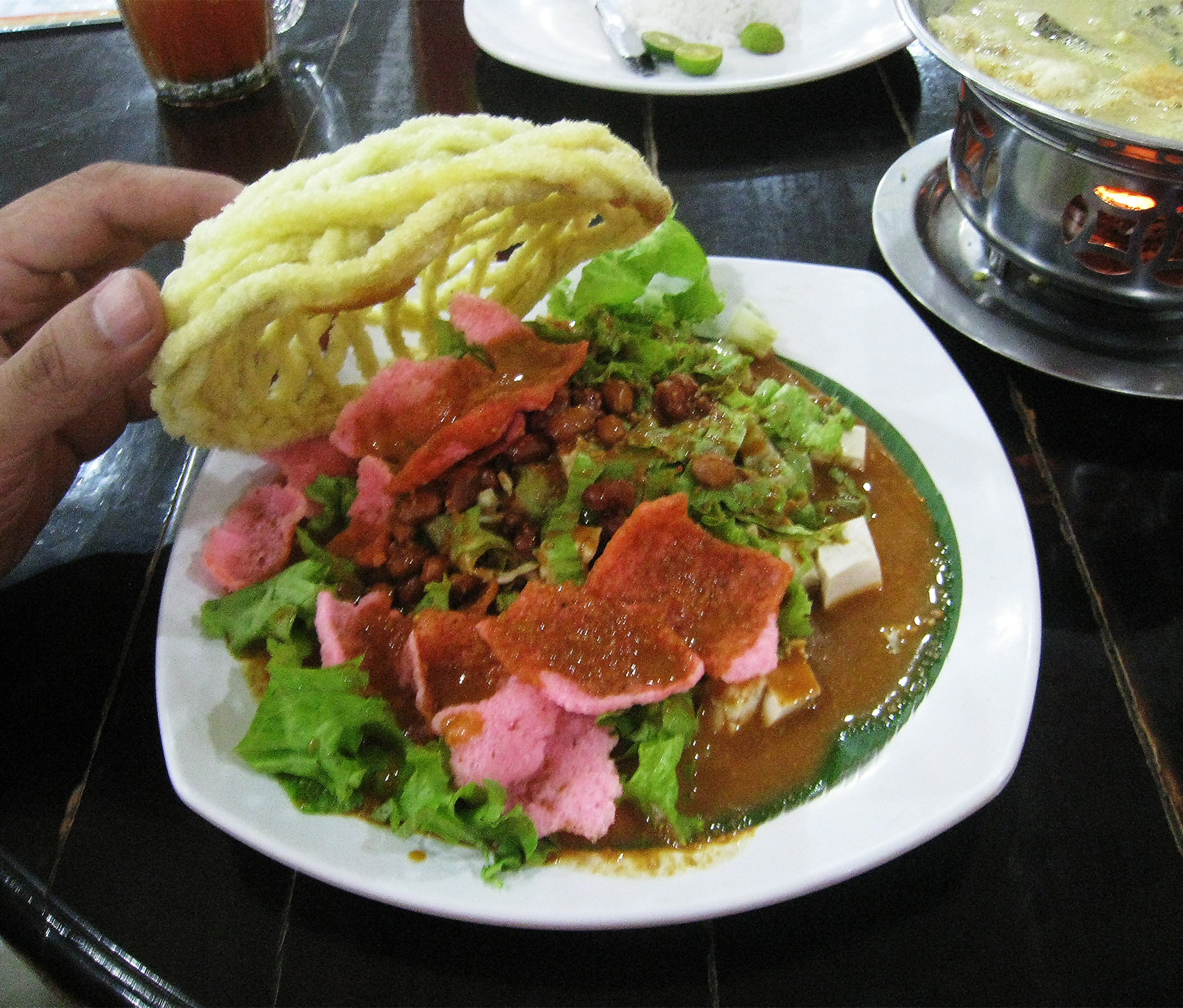
- Asinan Betawi topped with yellow kerupuk mie
- Course: Snack
- Place of origin: Indonesia
- Region or state: Jakarta and West Java
- Serving temperature: Room temperature
- Main ingredients: Various vegetables or fruits in hot, sour and sweet sauce

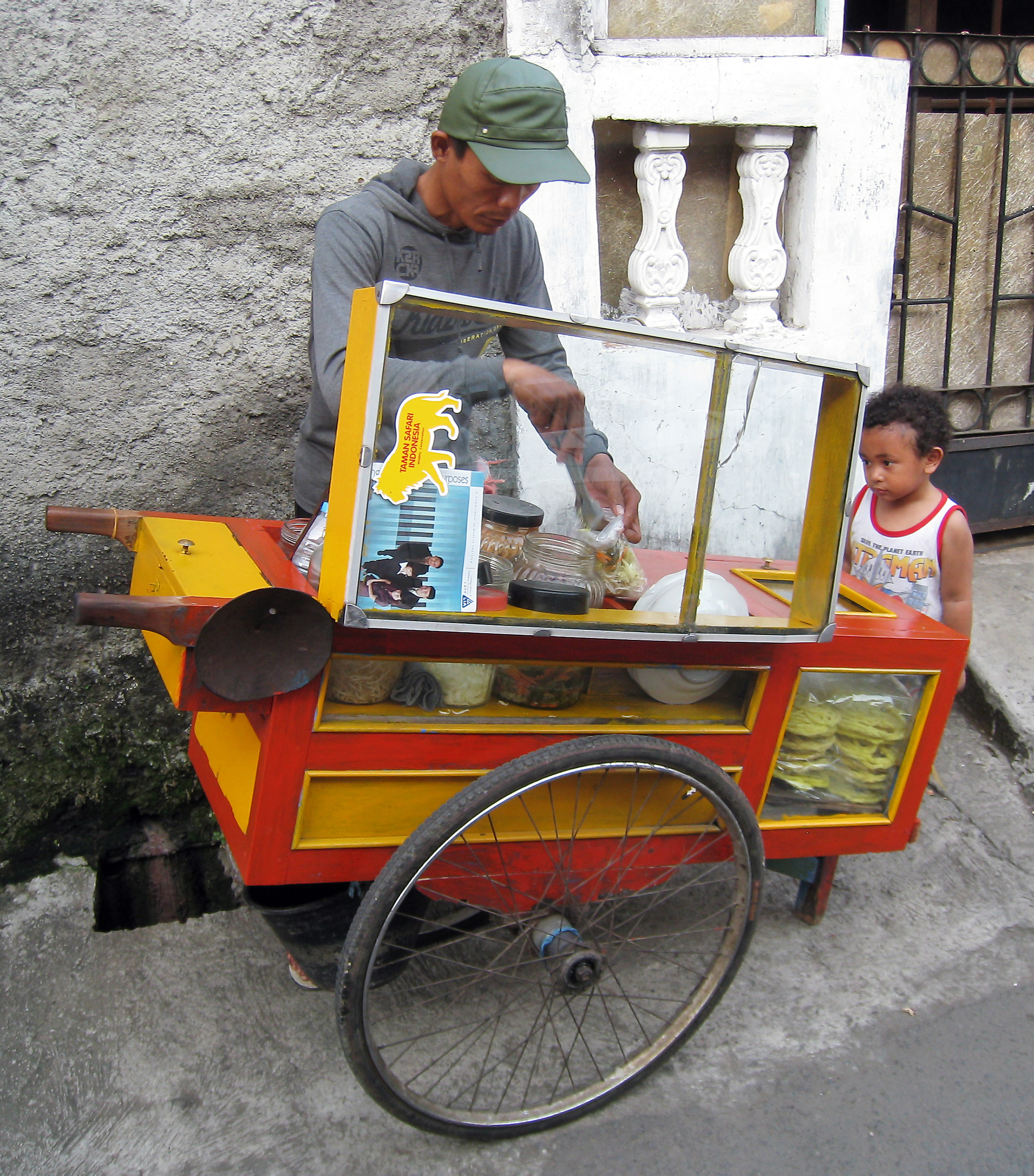
Asinan peddlar frequenting residential area in Jakarta, Indonesia

Asinan is a pickled (either brined or vinegared) vegetable or fruit dish, commonly found in Indonesia. Asin, Indonesian for "salty", is the process of preserving the ingredients by soaking them in a solution of salty water. Asinan is similar to rujak, which is usually served fresh, while asinan is preserved vegetables or fruits. Of the many types and variations of asinan in Indonesia, the most popular are asinan Betawi and asinan Bogor. Asinan can be found in restaurants and warung, and from travelling street vendors.

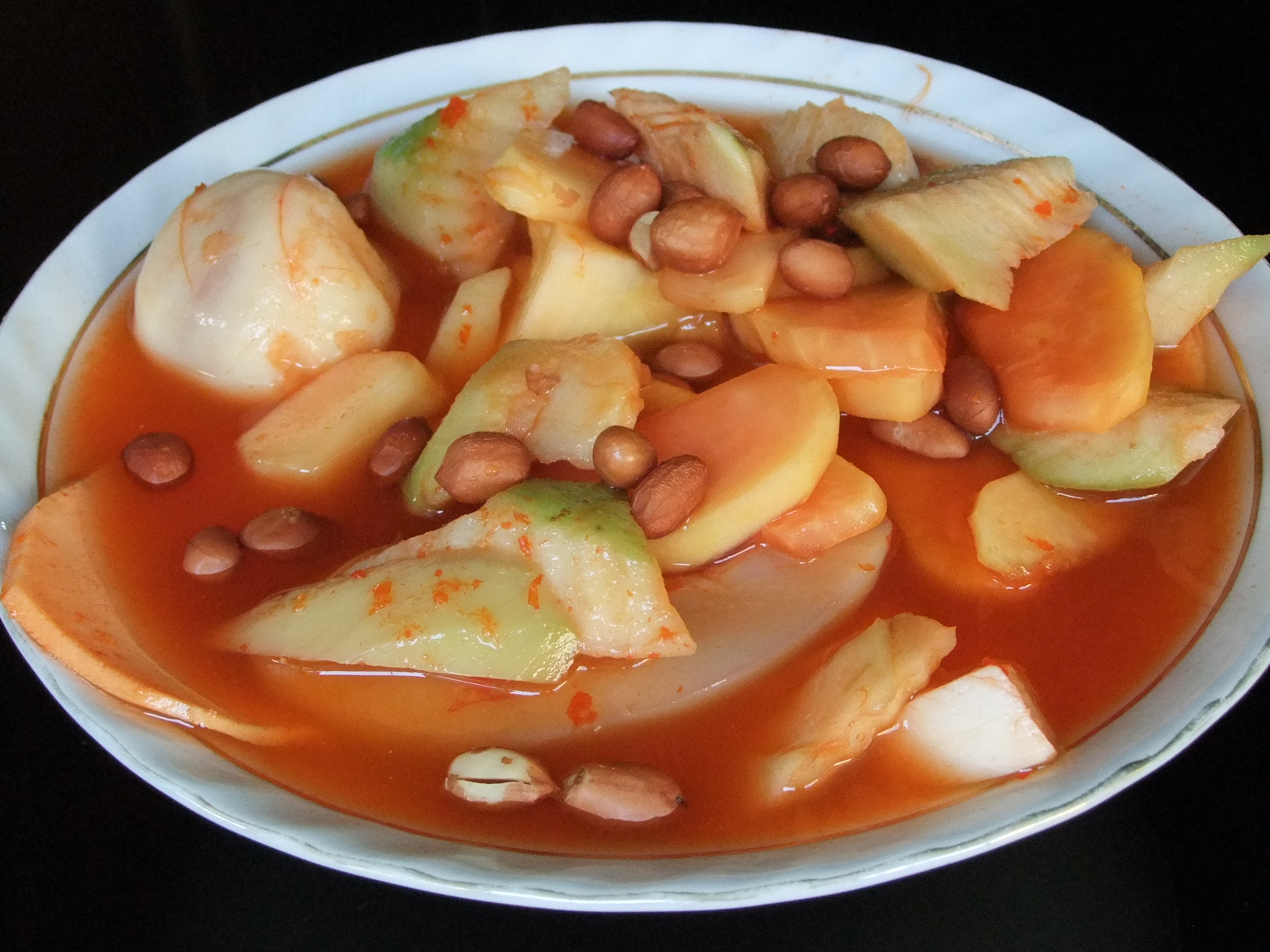
Asinan Bogor

- Asinan Betawi: The vegetable asinan of the Betawi people from Jakarta is preserved Chinese cabbage, cabbage, bean sprouts, tofu, and lettuce served in a thin, hot, peanut sauce with vinegar, topped with peanuts and krupuk (especially krupuk mie).
- Asinan Bogor: The fruit asinan of Bogor city, West Java is preserved tropical fruits, such as raw mango, water apple, papaya, ambarella, jicama, nutmeg, and pineapple served in sweet, hot, and sour vinegar and chili sauce, sprinkled with peanuts.

== Name ==
Asinan means salty food, in this context vegetables or fruits. In Surabaya, this dish is called sayur asin (salty vegetable).

== Ingredients ==
Ingredients of asinan sayur have in common with kimchi. Their main ingredients are cabbage, cucumber, and salt. They both have the cabbage salted, but in kimchi the salting process takes longer than the process in asinan. Other ingredients include bean sprouts, chili, and terasi.

== Variants ==
There are two main variants: asinan sayur and asinan buah (salted vegetable and salted fruit). Asinan sayur is also called asinan Jakarta or asinan Betawi. However, according to Indonesian food expert William Wongso, it doesn't guarantee the dish is originally from Jakarta. It might be influenced by Indian, Chinese, Arab, Portuguese, or Dutch cuisine.

== See also ==
- Acar – Southeast Asian pickled vegetables
- Kimchi – Korean side dish of fermented vegetables
- Rojak – Southeast Asian fruit and vegetable dish
