= Geplak =

Indonesian sweet snack, originating from Java

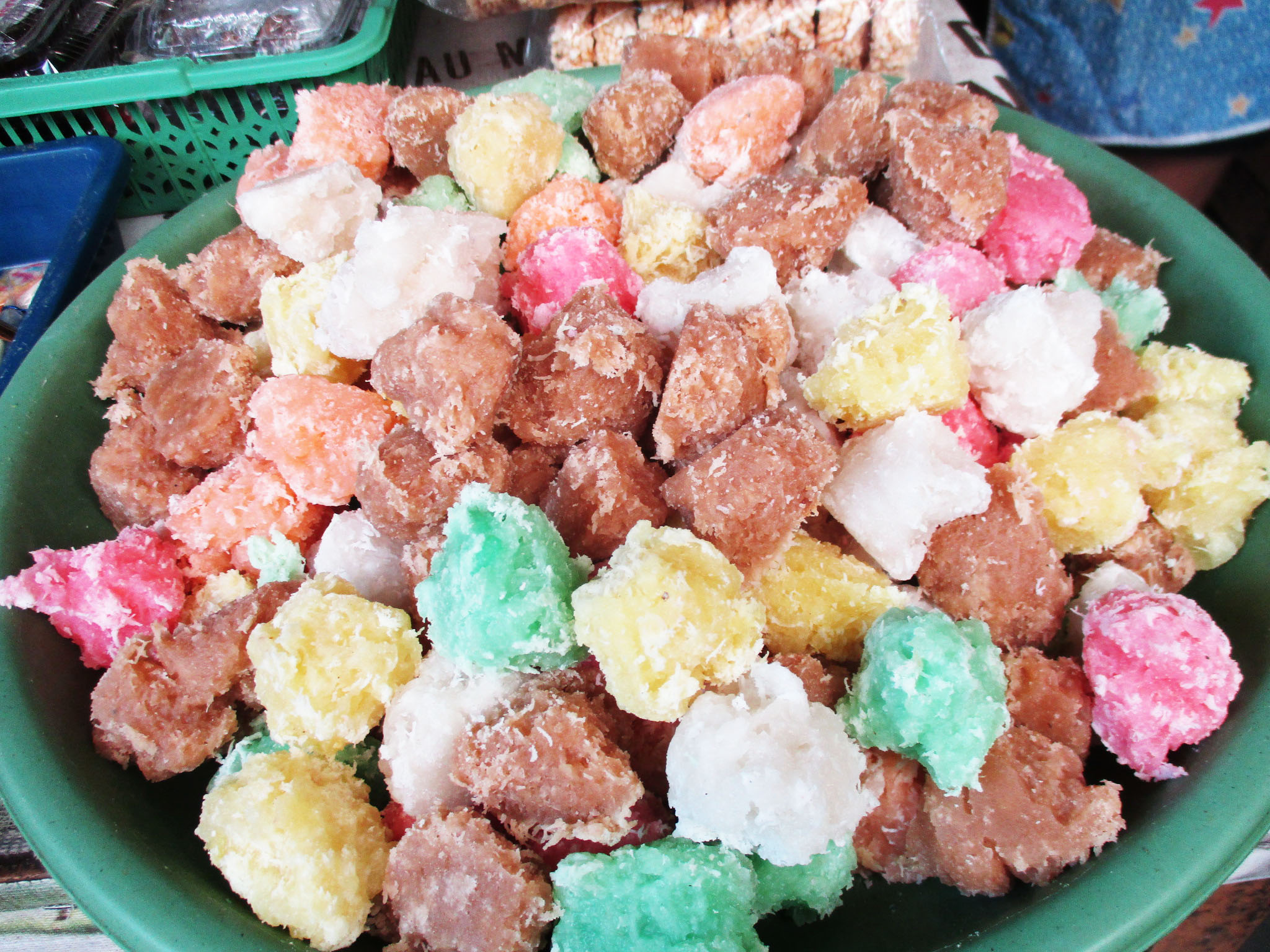
- A bulk of geplak
- Type: Confectionery
- Course: Snack
- Place of origin: Indonesia
- Region or state: Java
- Main ingredients: Coconut, sugar, food coloring

Geplak is an Indonesian sweet snack, originating from Java, made from equal parts coarsely grated coconut and sugar, often brightly colored. Some versions include rice flour, citrus leaves and/or pumpkin. Geplak is mainly produced in Bantul, a city in Yogyakarta, Indonesia.
