= Roti buaya =

Betawi traditional bread

Roti Buaya
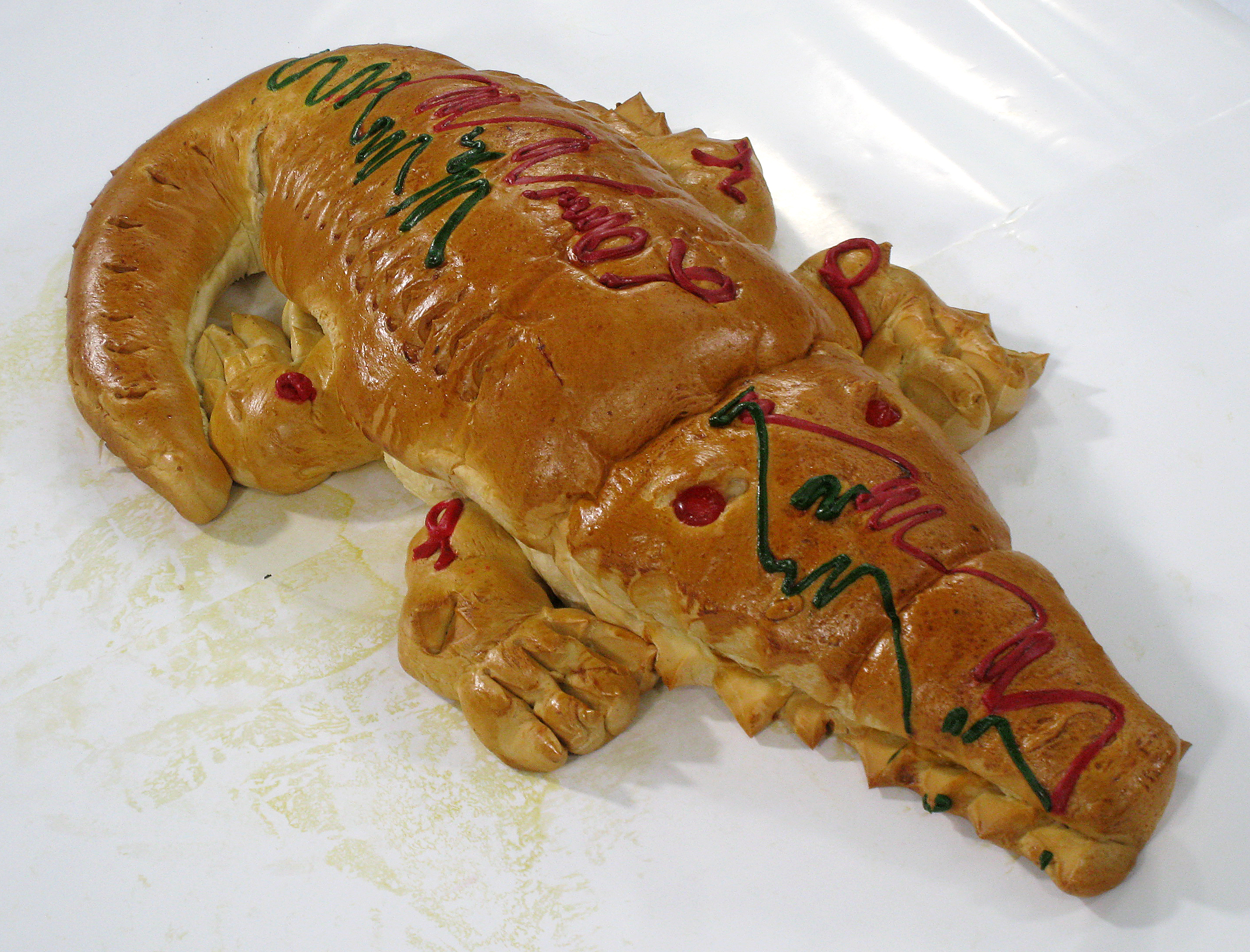
- Roti Buaya in the shape of a crocodile
- Type: Snack, appetizer, dessert
- Place of origin: Indonesia
- Region or state: Jakarta, Banten, West Java

Roti buaya (English: Crocodile bread) is a Betawi two piece sweetened bread in the shape of a crocodile. Roti buaya is always present in traditional Betawi wedding ceremonies.

== History ==
Bread and pastry-making was introduced by Europeans that settled in Batavia (Jakarta), the Portuguese and Dutch. Before the arrival of the Europeans who introduced bread, the crocodile shaped dish was made from yam or cassava. The modern version of roti buaya was created during the colonial era were influenced by Dutch cuisine along with selat solo (Solo salad), macaroni schotel (macaroni casserole), pastel tutup (Shepherd's pie), bistik jawa (Javanese beef steak), semur (from Dutch smoor), erten (pea soup), brenebon (kidney bean soup) and sop buntut.

== Symbolism ==
The Betawi believe that crocodiles mate with only one partner; therefore, the bread is believed to represent the fidelity of married couples. During the wedding, the bread on the bride's side is noticed by the guests and the condition of the bread is considered to represent the groom's character. Crocodiles have traditionally been considered to be very patient. Besides fidelity, the bread also represents economic establishment. However, in modern culture the symbolism of the crocodile has changed. A crocodile can refer to bad things, such as in buaya judi (a gambler), buaya minum (an alcoholic) and buaya darat (an unfaithful person).

The bread also portrayed patience because crocodiles were patient waiting for their prey. Another version stated that the bread depicted masculinity.

== Bibliography ==
- Mulyawati, Wahyuni; Harahap, Ilse (2007). Hidangan Betawi (in Indonesian). Gramedia Pustaka Utama. ISBN 9789792225105.
- Shahab, Alwi (2004). Junaidi, Irfan (ed.). Saudagar Baghdad dari Betawi (in Indonesian). Jakarta: Penerbit Republika. ISBN 9789793210308.
