= List of Indonesian desserts =

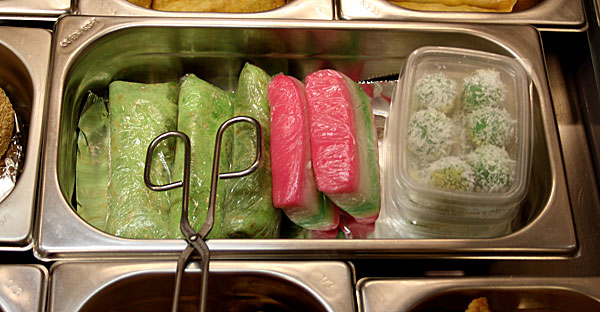
Popular Indonesian desserts: dadar gulung, kue lapis, and klepon

This is a list of Indonesian desserts. In Indonesia, desserts are called pencuci mulut or hidangan penutup. The style of cooking and foods in Indonesian cuisine—including desserts—are local cuisine with Arabs, Chinese, Indian, and European (especially Dutch, Portuguese, and Spanish) cuisine influences, adapted to local tastes, local palates and indigenous ingredients. Indonesian desserts are very diverse and rich.

== A ==
Name	Image	Region/Popularity	Description
Agar-agar		Nationwide	Puddings flavoured jellies like almond tofu, as well as fruit aspics.
Angsle		Java	A mix of melinjo, glutinous rice, peanut, sago pearl, white bread, coconut milk, screwpine leaf, ginger and milk.
Apem		Nationwide, with Indian-influenced	A steamed dough made of rice flour, coconut milk, yeast and palm sugar, usually served with grated coconut.
Asida		Maluku Islands	A dish made up of a cooked wheat flour lump of dough, sometimes with added butter or honey. It is popular during Ramadan.

== B ==
Name	Image	Region/Popularity	Description
Bakpia		Nationwide, but especially in Java	A popular Indonesian bean-filled moon cake-like pastry.
Bakpia pathok		Yogyakarta	A small patty of baked pastry filled with sweet mung bean paste.
Bibingka		Java and Eastern Indonesia	A type of cake made with rice flour, sugar, clarified butter, and coconut milk. Usually served during Christmas.
Bika ambon		Medan, North Sumatra	A type of cake made with as tapioca flour, eggs, sugar, yeast and coconut milk. The yeast creates bubbles, which creates sponge-like holes and gives it a unique spongy texture when it is baked. It is generally sold in pandan and banana flavor, but today it is also available in durian, cheese and chocolate flavour.
Bolu gulung		Nationwide	A type of Swiss roll that filled with butter cream, cheese, kaya, or fruit jam. It is also very common for Swiss rolls to be sold by the slice, but some shops sell by both slice and roll.
Bolu kukus		Nationwide	A sponge cake that mainly only uses wheat flour (without any rice flour and tapioca) with common vanilla, chocolate, or strawberry flavouring, acquired from food flavouring essence as ingredients.
Brem		Madiun, East Java	Brem is made from fermented tape. Brem is a special snack from Madiun, East Java. The liquid version is light alcoholic beverage also called Brem originated from Bali.
Bubur candil		Java	Glutinous rice cake ball stewed in gula jawa (palm sugar), served with thick coconut milk. Similar to kolak biji salak
Bubur cha cha		Betawi and Malay	A traditional Betawi and Malay dessert, prepared using pearled sago, sweet potatoes, yams, bananas, coconut milk, pandan leaves, sugar and salt. It can be served hot or cold.
Bubur kacang hijau		Nationwide	Green beans porridge, sweetened with sugar, and served with thick coconut milk.
Bubur ketan hitam		Nationwide	Black glutinous rice porridge, sweetened with sugar, and served with thick coconut milk.
Bubur sumsum		Nationwide	White congee made from rice flour and eaten with brown sugar sauce.

== C ==
Name	Image	Region/Popularity	Description
Cenil		Java	Rice flour-based small glutinous cake, sweetened with sugar, moulded and coloured. Served with fresh grated coconut.
Cendol		Nationwide	Sweet jelly drink, rice flour jelly with green natural coloring from pandan leaf, mixed with coconut milk, shaved ice and palm/brown sugar
Cincau		Nationwide	A jelly-like dessert, made using the Platostoma palustre and has a mild, slightly bitter taste. It is served chilled, with other toppings such as fruit, or in bubble tea or other drinks.
Clorot		Nationwide, but especially Javanese	Sticky dough of glutinous rice flour sweetened with coconut sugar filled into the cone-shaped janur (young coconut leaf), and steamed until cooked.

== D ==
Name	Image	Region/Popularity	Description
Dadar gulung		Javanese, today nationwide	Usually has a green colour, which is acquired from daun suji or pandan leaves It is a green-coloured folded omelette or pancake made of rice flour, filled with grated coconut and palm sugar.
Dadiah		West Sumatra	Traditional West Sumatran water buffalo milk yoghurt.
Dodol or jenang		Java	Rice flour-based small glutinous sweets, sweetened with coconut sugar, moulded and coloured. Often add fruit scent and taste such as durian.

== E ==
Name	Image	Region/Popularity	Description
Es buah		Nationwide	
Es campur		Nationwide	Shaved ice with coconut pieces, various fruits (usually jackfruit), grass jelly, syrup and condensed milk
Es cincau		Nationwide	Grass jelly and shredded ice with sugar or syrup.
Es dawet		Banjarnegara, Central Java	
Es doger		Bandung, West Java	Cold and sweet coconut ice dessert with syrup and various fillings
Es gabus		Java	Ice cream that made from sago flour which is boiled with coconut milk and frozen in the refrigerator.
Es kelapa muda		Nationwide	Fresh young coconut, coconut water mixed with or without syrup. Usually served intact whole fruit
Es lilin		Nationwide	Various flavors ice cream with wooden sticks.
Es puter		Java	Ice cream that made from coconut milk with a rough texture and traditionally frozen.
Es teler		Nationwide	A mixed of avocado, young coconut, jack fruit, shredded iced with sweet condensed milk.

== G ==
Name	Image	Region/Popularity	Description
Geplak		Yogyakarta	Sweets made from sugar and grated coconut.
Getuk		Java	Cassava paste, sweetened with sugar and moulded in a special tools that it resembles noodles. Often served with fresh grated coconut.

== K ==
Name	Image	Region/Popularity	Description
Klappertaart		Manado, North Sulawesi	Tart made from flour, sugar, milk, butter, as well as coconut flesh and juice.
Klepon		Nationwide	Boiled rice cake, stuffed with coconut sugar, and rolled in fresh grated coconut. It is flavoured with pandan leaves juice.
Kolak		Nationwide	A mix of sweet potato, cassava, banana, pumpkin, diced in bite size pieces and stewed in coconut milk and palm sugar. Sometimes vanilla or ginger are added for extra flavour.
Kue bingka		Banjarese	A cake made of mashed potato, flour, eggs, sugar, coconut milk, vanilla, milk and margarine, all mixed as dough and baked until golden brown and cooked.
Kue bugis		Makassarese, Buginese, and Javanese	A traditional snack of soft glutinous rice flour cake, filled with sweet grated coconut.
Kue cubit		Nationwide	This cake is called kue cubit because of its small size: to eat it one has to pinch it.
Kue cucur		Nationwide	Pancake made of fried rice flour batter and coconut sugar.
Kue kochi		Malay, Javanese, and Peranakan	A cake dumpling made from glutinous rice flour, and stuffed with coconut fillings with palm sugar.
Kue ku		Betawi, Javanese, and Chinese Indonesian	A small round or oval shaped Chinese pastry with soft sticky glutinous rice flour skin wrapped around a sweet filling in the centre.
Kue lapis		Nationwide	A traditional snack of colourful layered soft rice flour pudding.
Kue lumpur surga		Nationwide	Cake made from coconut milk, potatoes, flour, and eggs shaped like mud.
Kue maksuba		Palembangese	A traditional layered cake which is mainly made with duck egg and sweetened condensed milk without any flours. Each cake needs approximately more than two dozens of duck eggs.
Kue mangkok		Java	Traditional steamed cupcake, similar to bolu kukus.
Kue putu		Nationwide	Similar to klepon, except that it's cylindrical in shape whilst klepon is spherical.
Kue putu mangkok		Nationwide	A round-shaped, traditional steamed rice flour kue or sweet snack filled with palm sugar. This dish is similar to kue putu.

== L ==
Name	Image	Region/Popularity	Description
Lahang		West Java	Drink made from Arenga pinnata (aren) sap
Laksamana mengamuk		Riau Islands	Fresh mango with milk.
Lapis legit or spekuk		Nationwide	A spiced layered cake, made mainly of egg yolk, flour and margarine/butter.
Legen		East Java	A drink made of Siwalan palm sap.
Lupis		Java	Glutinous rice cake wrapped and cooked in banana leaves, served with grated coconut and drizzled with thick coconut sugar syrup.

== M ==
Name	Image	Region/Popularity	Description
Madumongso		Java	This snack made from black sticky rice as a basic ingredient. The taste is mixed with sweet because the black rice is previously processed before it becomes tapai (through the fermentation process) and cooked become dodol.
Meuseukat		Aceh	Dodol-like pineapple cake
Mochi		Nationwide	Rice flour based cake filled with peanuts paste, sometimes sprinkled with sesame seeds.

== N ==
Name	Image	Region/Popularity	Description
Nagasari		Nationwide	Steamed rice cake wrapped in banana leaves, and stuffed with banana.
Nata de coco		Nationwide	A jelly-like food produced by the fermentation of coconut water, which gels through the production of microbial cellulose by Komagataeibacter xylinus.

== O ==
Name	Image	Region/Popularity	Description
Ombusombus		Batak	Sticky rice with palm sugar filling, rolled in coconut flakes.
Onde-onde		Nationwide	Glutinous rice cake balls, filled with sweet green beans paste, and rolled in sesame seed and then fried.

== P ==
Name	Image	Region/Popularity	Description
Pai susu		Bali	A type of custard tart that consisting of an outer pastry crust filled with egg custard as well as condensed milk and baked.
Pastel de nata		Jakarta and Timor	An egg tart pastry dusted with cinnamon, derived from Portuguese cuisine.
Poffertjes		Nationwide	Similar to kue cubit, this cake has a light and spongy texture.
Puding sagu		Sumatra and Eastern Indonesia	A sweet pudding made by boiling sago with either water or milk and adding sugar and sometimes additional flavourings.
Putu mayang		Nationwide, but especially Betawi	Made from starch or rice flour shaped like noodles, with a mixture of coconut milk, and served with kinca or liquid javanese sugar.

== R ==
Name	Image	Region/Popularity	Description
Roti bolen		Nationwide	Baked pastry with crust layers similar to those of croissant, baked flour with butter or margarine layers, filled with cheese and banana. Other variants uses durian fillings. The cake demonstrate European pastry influences.
Roti buaya		Betawi	Crocodile-shaped bread commonly served during Betawi wedding and celebrations.
Roti gambang or roti ganjel rel		Jakarta and Semarang, Central Java	A rectangular shaped brown bread with sesame seeds, flavored with cinnamon and palm sugar. Usually served during Dugderan and Ramadhan.

== S ==
Name	Image	Region/Popularity	Description
Serabi		Java	Rice pancake that is made from rice flour with coconut milk or shredded coconut as an emulsifier.
Seri muka		Banjarese and Malay	A two-layered dessert with steamed glutinous rice forming the bottom half and a green custard layer made with pandan juice.
Spekulaas		Nationwide	A thin, very crunchy, caramelized, and slightly browned cookie, derived from Dutch cuisine.
Spiku		East Java	A cake that has similar ingredient to lapis legit but only have three layers of plain and chocolate flavour layered cake.

== T ==
Name	Image	Region/Popularity	Description
Tapai		Nationwide	A traditional fermented food of rice or other starchy foods. It has a sweet or sour taste.
Terang bulan		Nationwide	Originally a Chinese snack, but nowadays it is labelled as martabak.
Terang bulan mini		Nationwide	Smaller version of terang bulan.
Timphan		Aceh	A steamed banana dumpling that consists of glutinous rice flour, ground banana and coconut milk. It is quite similar to Javanese or Buginese nagasari.
Ting-ting jahe		Nationwide	A chewy ginger candy.

== V ==
Name	Image	Region/Popularity	Description
Vla		Nationwide	A dairy product made from fresh milk, derived from Dutch cuisine. Vla is made with eggs, sugar and fresh milk, although some industrial producers use cornstarch rather than eggs today. Vla is available in many different flavors of which vanilla is most popular. Other flavors include chocolate, caramel, banana, orange and apple.

== W ==
Name	Image	Region/Popularity	Description
Wajik		Nationwide, but especially Javanese	A diamond-shaped compressed sweet glutinous rice cake.

== See also ==
- Cuisine of Indonesia
- Dessert
- Kue
- List of desserts
- List of Indonesian beverages
- List of Indonesian dishes
- List of Indonesian snacks
- List of Indonesian soups
- Street food of Indonesia
