= Bolu kukus =

Indonesian cake

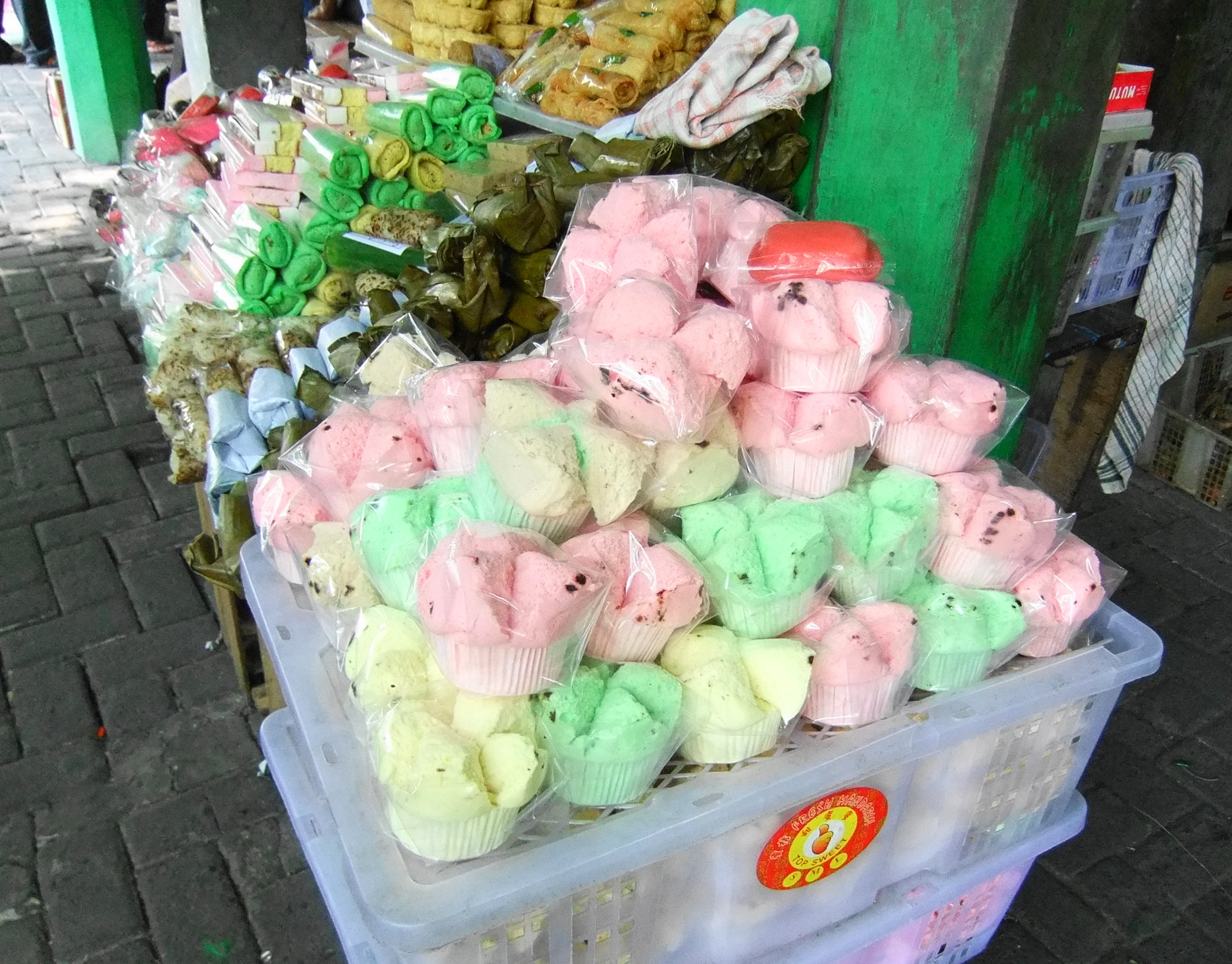
- Bolu kukus being sold in traditional market
- Type: Kue bolu, cupcake, kue
- Course: Snack, dessert
- Place of origin: Indonesia
- Region or state: Java
- Serving temperature: room temperature
- Main ingredients: Wheat flour

Bolu kukus (lit. 'steamed tart') is an Indonesian traditional snack of steamed sponge cupcake. The term "bolu kukus" however, usually refers to a type of kue mangkuk that is baked using mainly wheat flour (without any rice flour and tapioca) with sugar, eggs, milk and soda, while also using common vanilla, chocolate, pandan or strawberry flavouring, acquired from food flavouring essence. The cake makes use of beaten eggs and soda as an emulsifier, the type of soda often being lemon sparkling water, such as Sprite.

Bolu kukus is considered a type of kue bolu, which encompasses a variety of sponge cakes, cupcakes and tarts. The term bolu derives from the Portuguese bolo to generally describe a cake. The texture is thus soft and fluffy just like a tart or chiffon cake. Bolu kukus is a steamed tart instead of a commonly baked cupcake. The bolu kukus base is, however, usually covered with a corrugated paper container, just like common cupcakes.

== See also ==
- Cuisine of Indonesia
- Kue
- Kue apem
- Kue mangkok
- Kue putu mangkok
- Kue putu mayang
