= Ji dan gao =

Taiwanese sponge cake

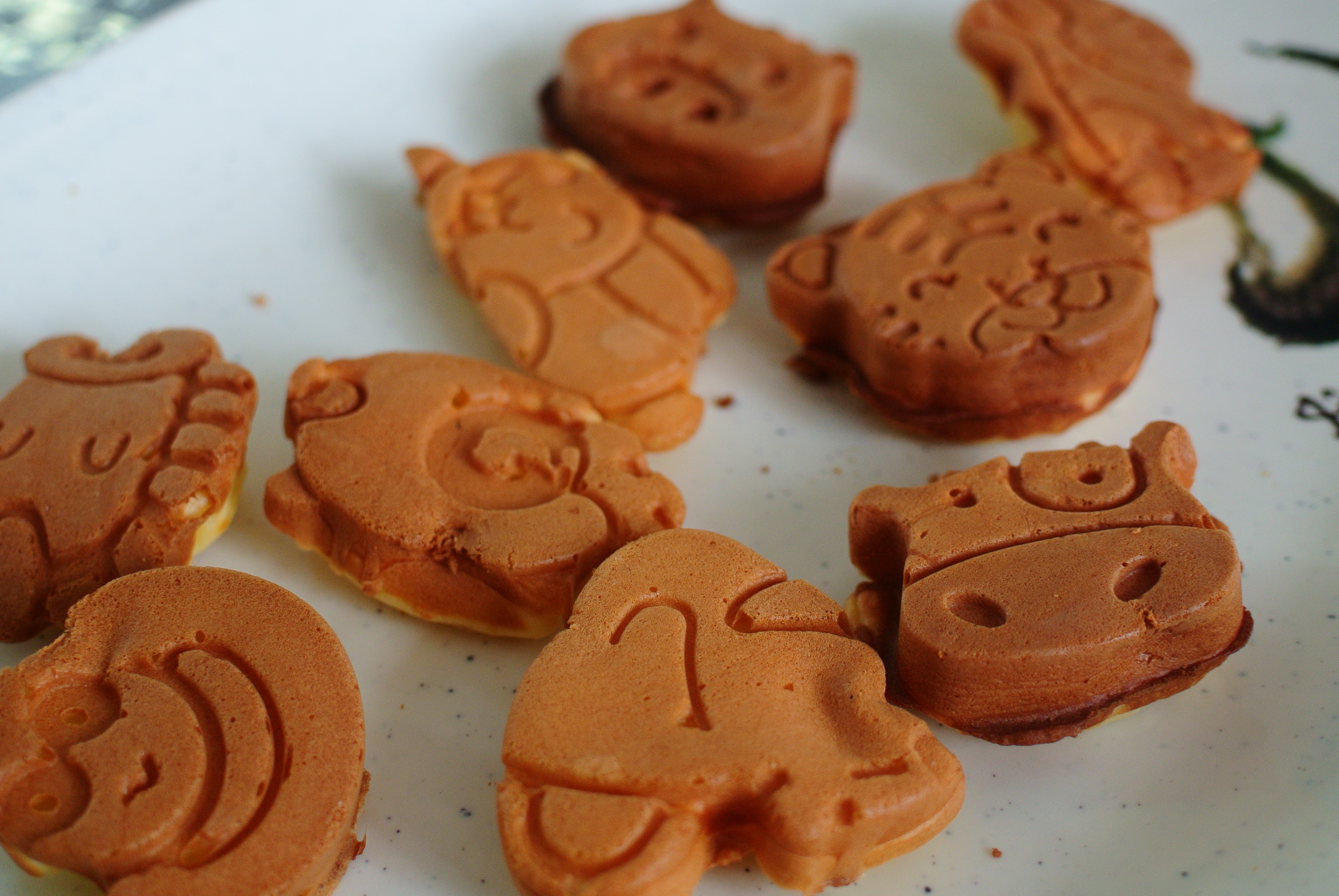
- Alternative names: Egg cake
- Place of origin: Taiwan
- Main ingredients: rice flour
- Variations: Bahulu

Ji dan gao (Chinese: 雞蛋糕; pinyin: jī dàn gāo; lit. 'chicken egg cake') are Taiwanese sponge cakes served as desserts.

== History ==
Ji dan gao are possibly related to the Malay pastry Bahulu. They were introduced to Hawaii by restaurateur Chock Chin in 1998.

== Preparation ==
They are prepared by steaming sponge cakes made of rice flour, milk, eggs and sugar.
