= Roti bolen =

Indonesian bread

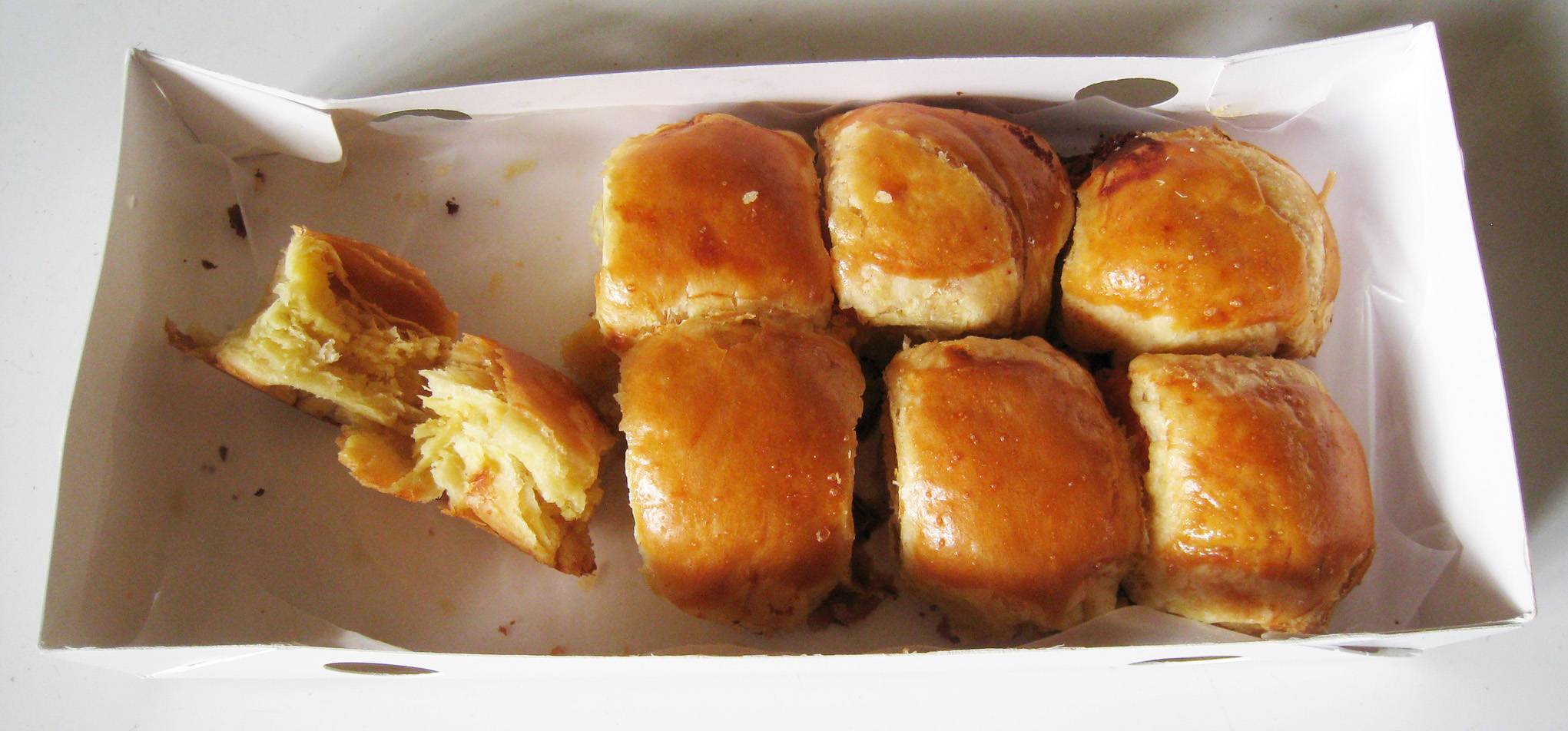
- Type: Bread, cake, pastry
- Course: Breakfast, dessert, snack
- Place of origin: Indonesia
- Region or state: West Java

Roti bolen is an Indonesian baked bread pastry with crust layers similar to those of croissant, made from flour with butter or margarine layers, filled with cheese and banana. Other variants use durian fillings. The cake demonstrates influences from European pastry.

== See also ==
- Cuisine of Indonesia
- Kue
- List of Indonesian desserts
- List of Indonesian dishes
- List of Indonesian snacks
