= Kue bolu =

Indonesian cake

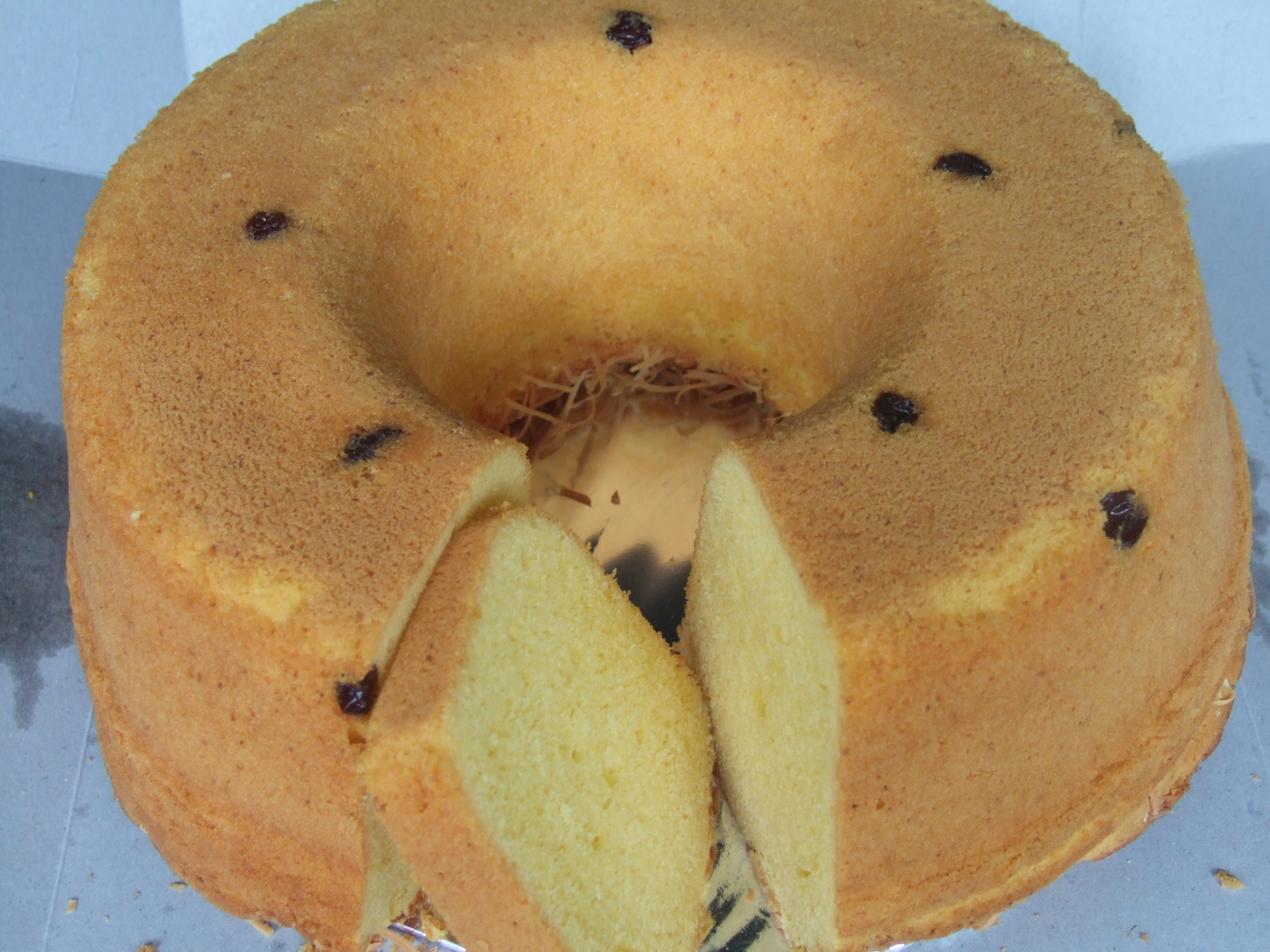
- Bolu bruder from Manado
- Type: Sponge cake, kue
- Course: Snack, dessert
- Place of origin: Indonesia
- Serving temperature: room temperature
- Main ingredients: Wheat flour, eggs, sugar, butter or margarine, yeast or baking powder

Kue bolu or simply bolu is an Indonesian term that describes a wide variety of sponge cakes, tarts and cupcakes.

Kue bolu might be steamed or baked. There are a wide variety of kue bolu, and most have a soft and fluffy texture, akin to sponge cake or chiffon cake.

== Ingredients ==
The ingredients for kue bolu may include wheat flour, rice flour, sugar, milk, coconut milk, egg, and butter or margarine. Flavourings might include vanilla, chocolate or pandan.

Kue bolu is known for its soft and fluffy texture, created by a leavening agent that lightens and softens the dough mixture. Traditionally kue bolu uses yeast as a leavening agent, however, today baking powder or baking soda is more commonly used.

Today in Indonesia, bolu mostly refers to a bare sponge cake without any frosting. Cakes that are coated in frosting are called keik (derived from English "cake") instead.

== Etymology and history ==
Hundred years of colonisation of the Indonesian archipelago has left its legacy in local culinary tradition. European influences upon Indonesian cuisine are most prevalent in baking, pastry, cake and bread making techniques, introduced by Portuguese and Dutch colonists. The term bolu in Indonesian is derived from Portuguese bolo to describe cake, or more precisely sponge cake. This loanword comes from the historic Portuguese influence in Indonesia.

After the Dutch colonisation, the Dutch word taart also entered Indonesian vocabulary, as a similar kind of kue snack or cake. Today the terms bolu and tar or tart are used interchangeably to describe cakes or tarts.

== Variations ==
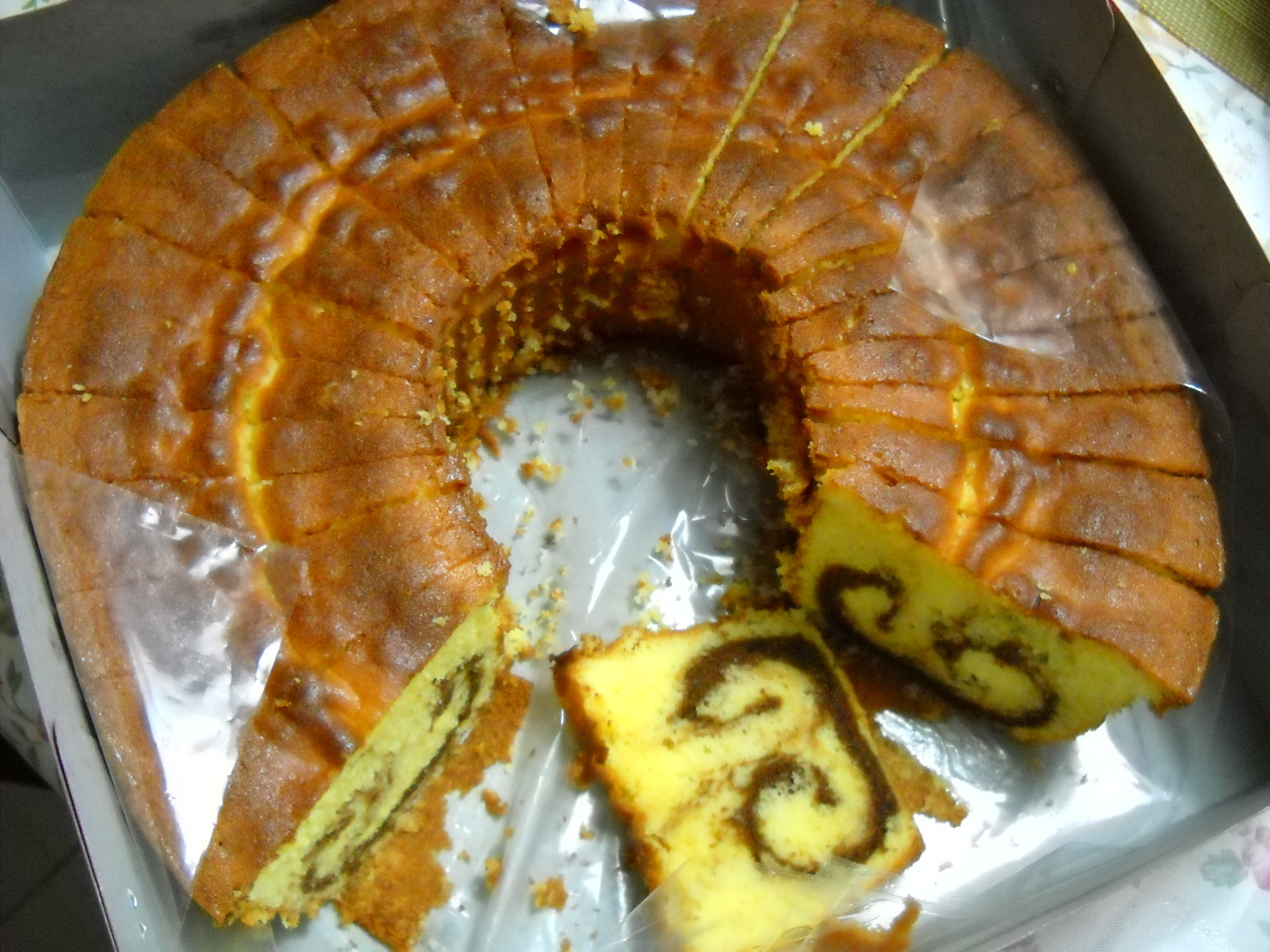
Bolu macan, tiger stripes bolu

In Indonesian cuisine bolu is categorized as a kue, which includes a wide variety of traditional snacks, cakes, and sweets. Kue bolu or simply bolu is often used as an umbrella term to identify wide varieties of cakes and tarts in Indonesia. Variations include:

- Bolu bahari: Small bolu cupcake from Kalimantan (Indonesian Borneo).
- Bolu bruder: lit. brother's cake, is a soft bolu from Manado (Minahasan). In Manado Malay, the term bruder means Christian priest, which is derived from the usage in Christianity. It is named after a Dutch dish of the same name, broeder. Spelling variations include brudel or bluder.
- Bolu emprit: Small bite-sized bolu of Javanese cuisine, prevalent in Yogyakarta.
- Bolu gulung: Rolled bolu akin to a Swiss roll.
- Bolu klemben: A variant of dry bolu from Banyuwangi, East Java. The shape is elliptical, akin to a cocoa pod. It is quite similar to kue bahulu.
- Bolu kukus: Steamed bolu cupcake, a popular jajan pasar (market purchase) in Indonesian traditional markets.
- Bolu macan or bolu marmer: Tiger stripes or marbled bolu, made by creating a stripe pattern using chocolate.
- Bolu lapis mandarin: Two-layered square bolu, usually flavoured plain and chocolate.
- Bolu pandan: Green coloured and pandan flavoured bolu.
- Bolu pisang: Banana flavoured bolu.
- Bolu tape keju: Bolu with tape (fermented cassava) and cheese.
- Kue bahulu or bolu kering: Bite-sized bolu from Malay cuisine, prevalent in the Malay Peninsula, Sumatra, and Borneo.

== Gallery ==
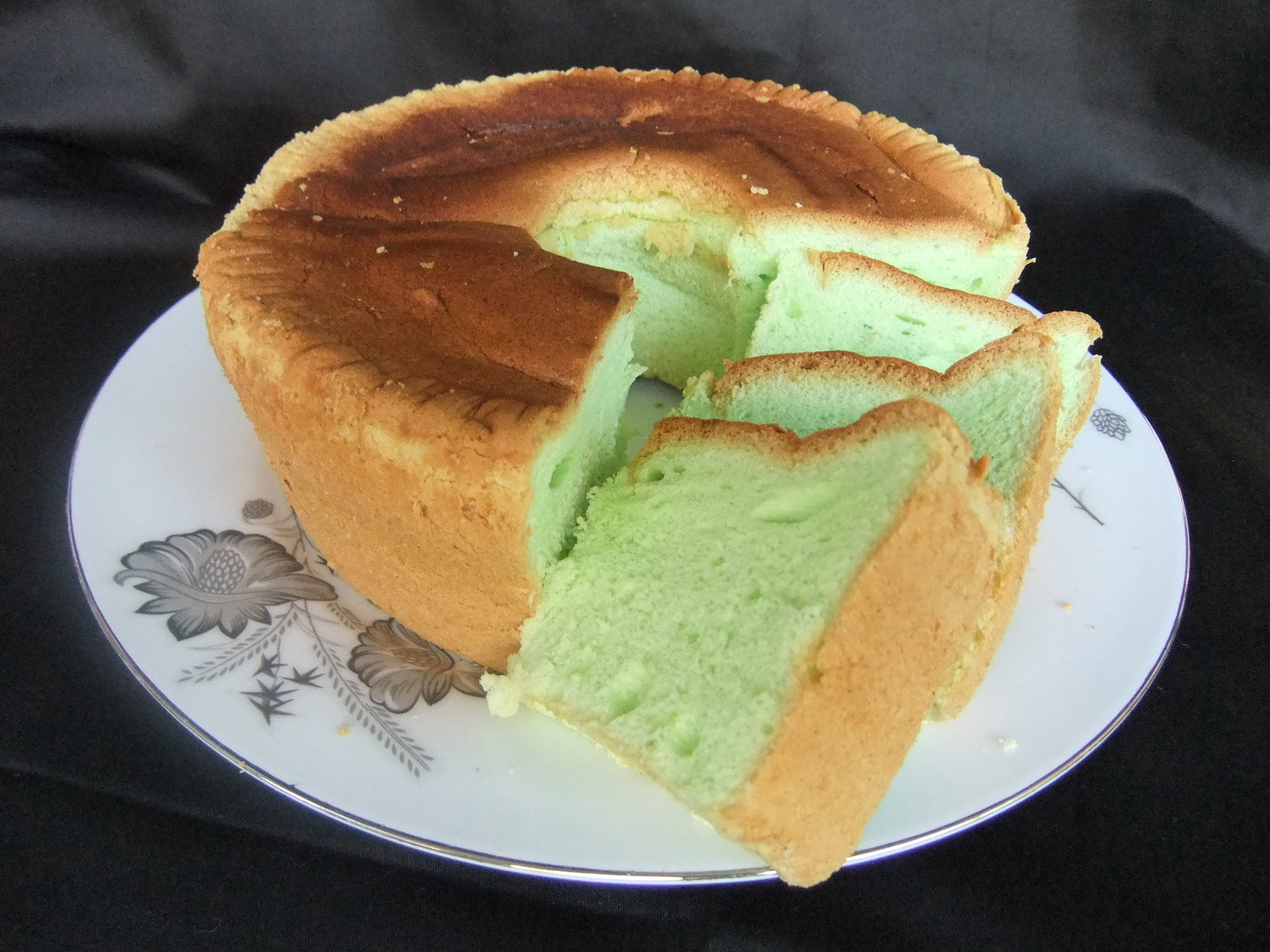
Bolu pandan

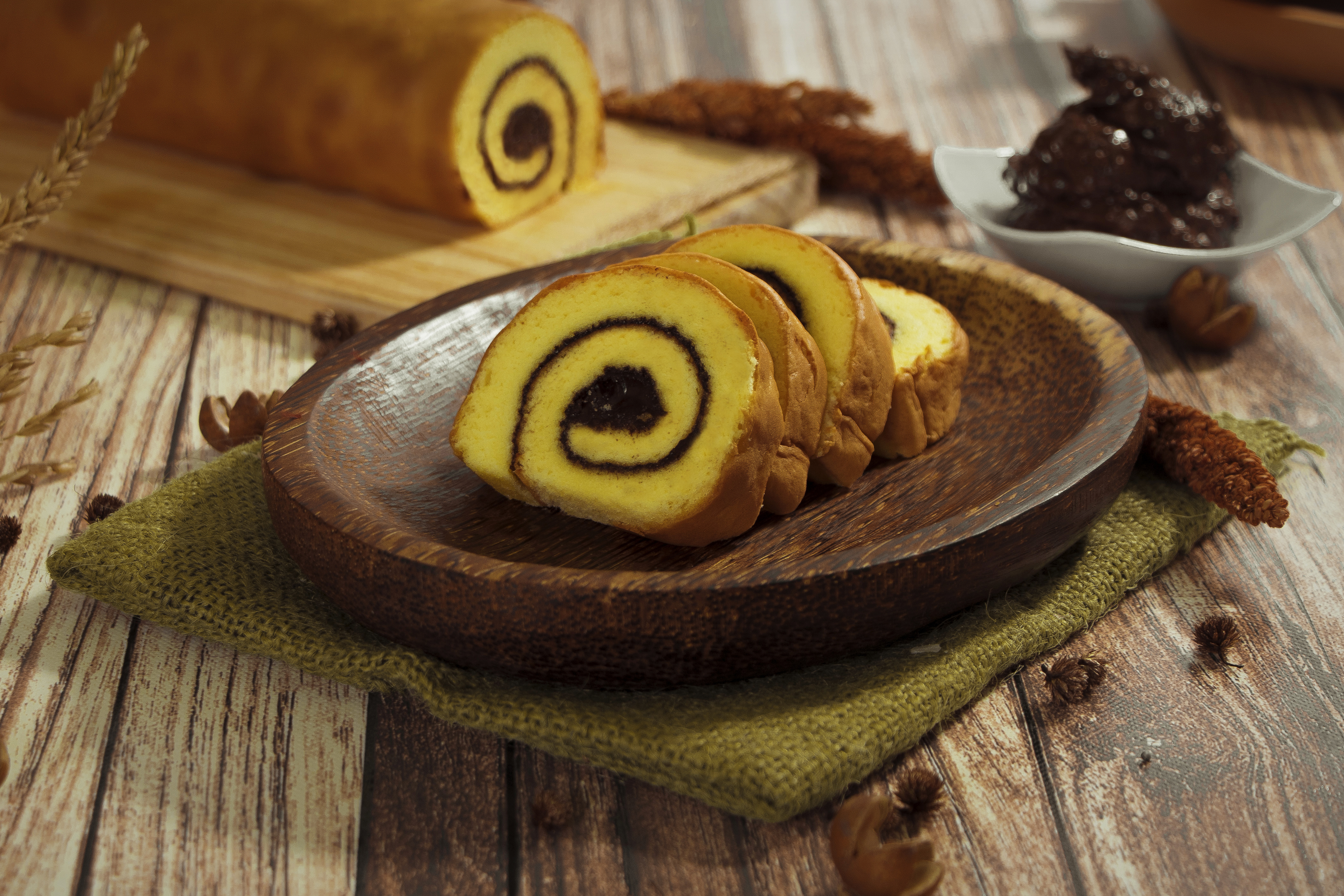
Bolu gulung

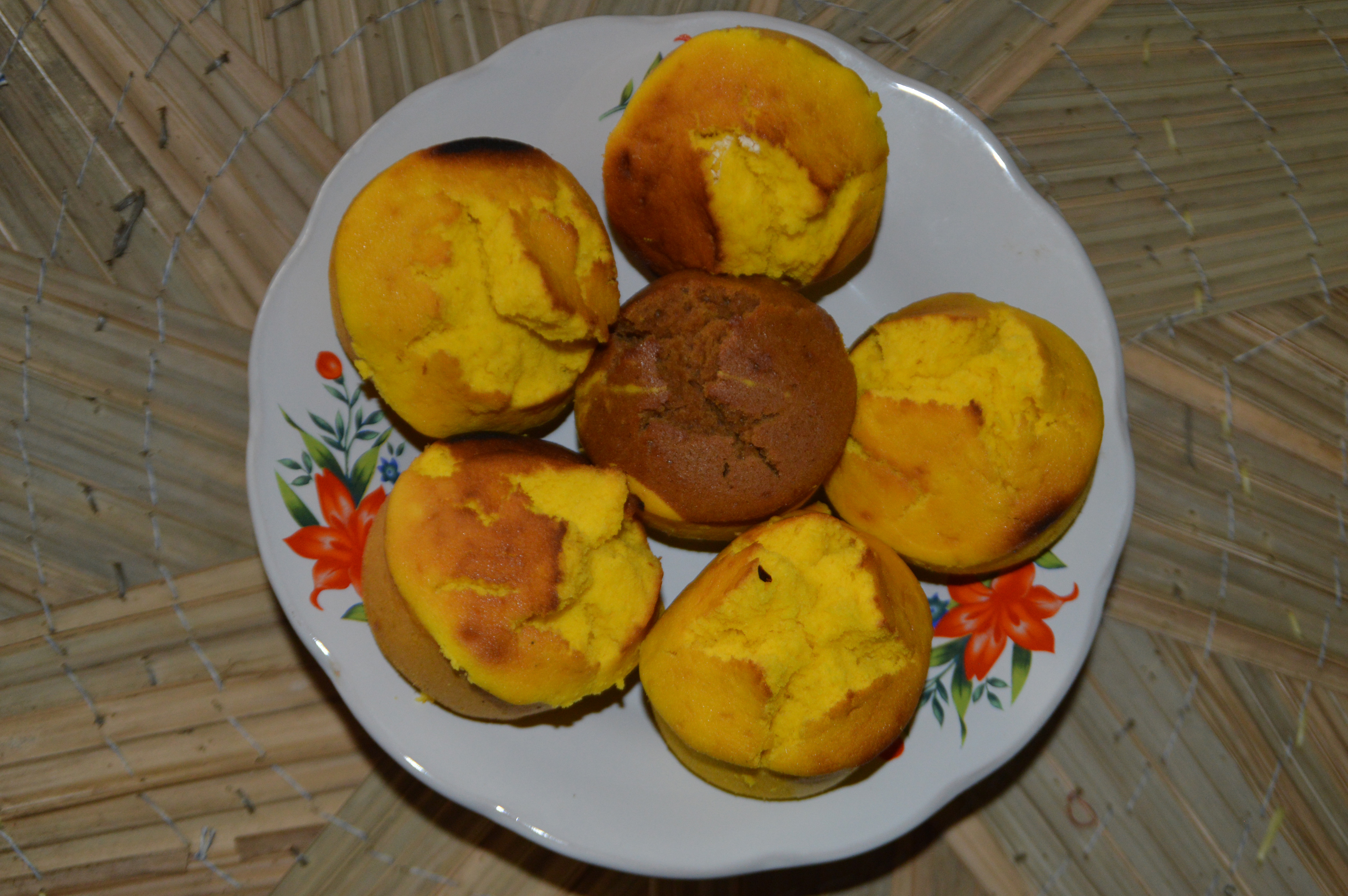
Bolu bahari

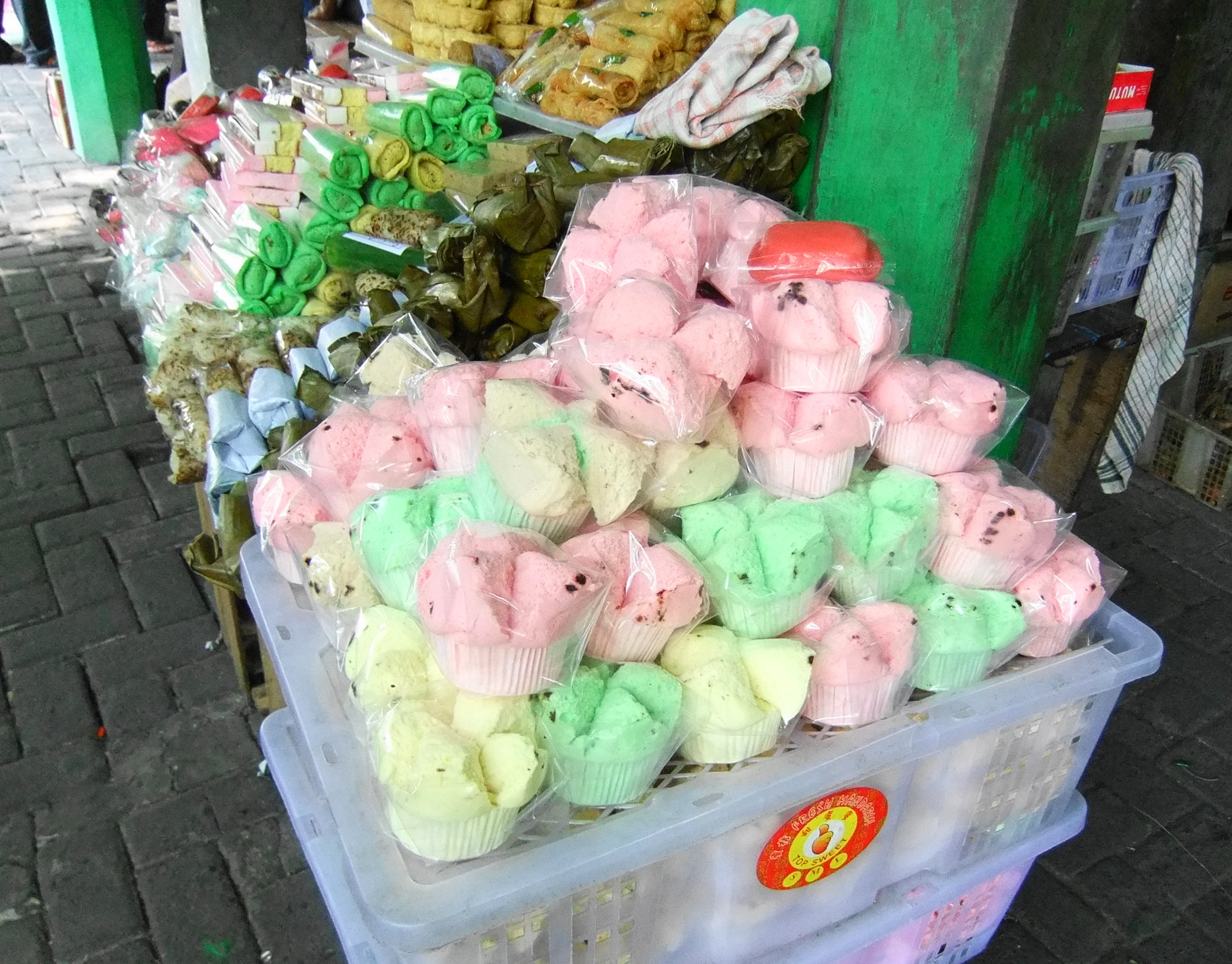
Bolu kukus

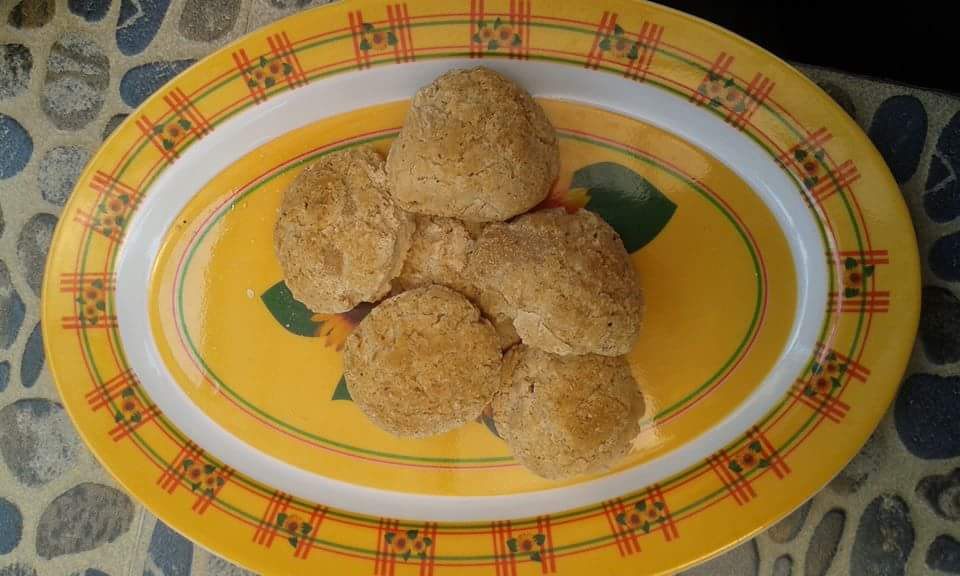
Bolu emprit

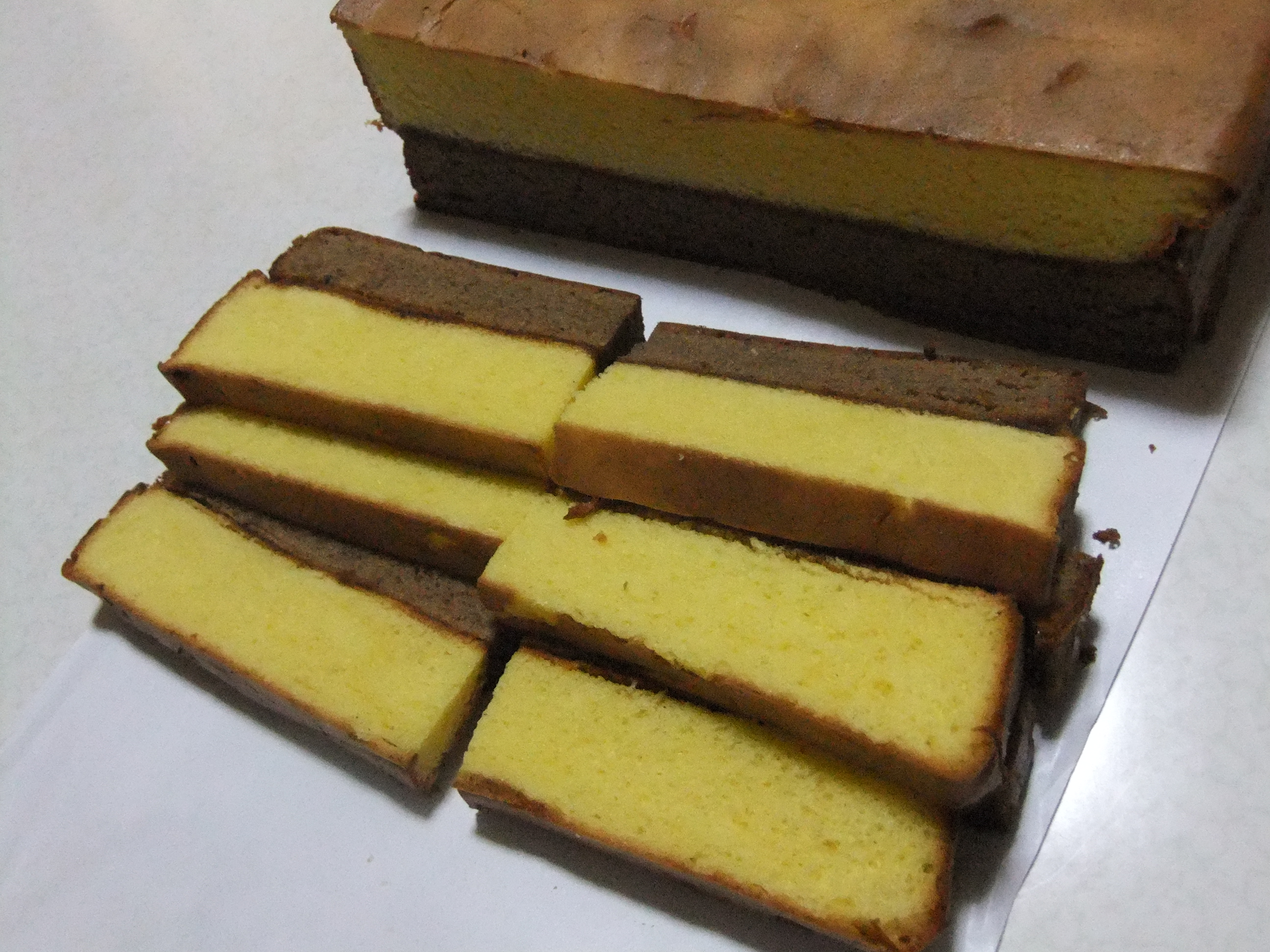
Bolu mandarin

== See also ==
- Cuisine of Indonesia
- Lapis legit
- Kue
- Kue mangkok
- Roti buaya
- Roti gambang
