= Bahulu =

Malaysian traditional snack

Bahulu باولو
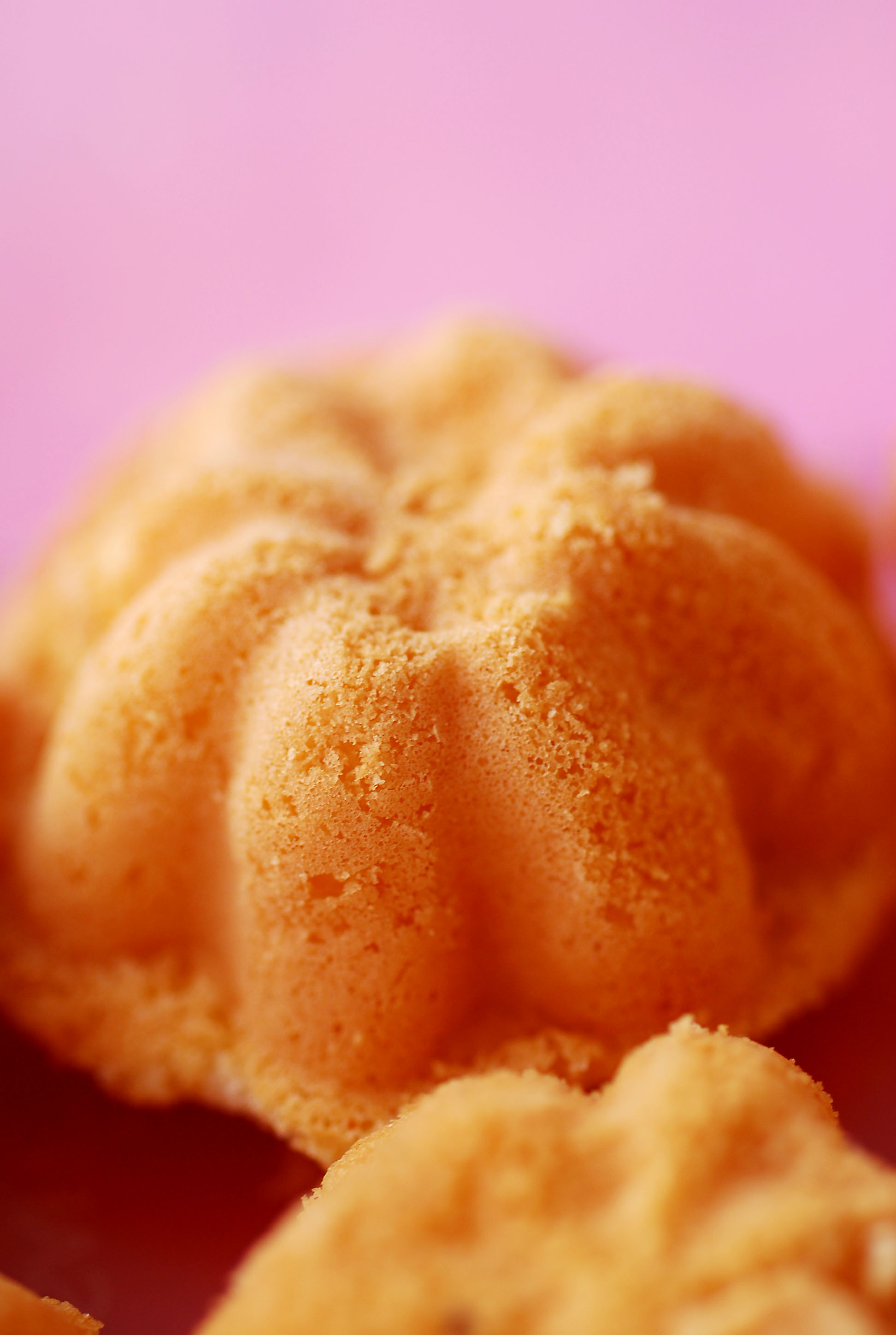
- Bahulu cermai (Cermai-shaped bahulu)
- Alternative names: Baulu
- Type: Cake, kue/kuih
- Course: Snack, dessert
- Place of origin: Malaysia
- Region or state: Malay Peninsula, also found in West Kalimantan and Brunei
- Serving temperature: room temperature
- Main ingredients: Wheat flour, eggs, sugar, baking powder

Bahulu or baulu (Jawi: باولو) is a traditional Malay cake (kue/kuih). It is similar in concept to the madeleine cake, but is not baked in a shell-shaped mold. There are three versions available, the most common being bahulu cermai (star-shaped) and the less common bahulu gulung (shaped like rolls) and bahulu lapis (layered). Bahulu is believed to be originated in Malay Peninsula during the colonisation era and is the corruption of the Malaccan Kristang (Portuguese-Eurasian people) word, bolu (Portuguese: bolo) which means cake. It is usually served during Eid al-Fitr as well as during the Chinese New Year.

In Indonesia, this cake is quite popular in Kalimantan, especially in Pontianak, Sambas and Singkawang in West Kalimantan. In other parts of Indonesia, bahulu is also called kue bolu kering, an old-fashioned dry bolu cake, and regarded as one of the numerous variant of kue bolu sponge cake.

In professional bakeries, modern oil sprays or butter are used to grease the trays. In a traditional home setting, bakers use a bundle of bruised pandan leaves tied together like a makeshift brush to paint the brass molds with oil. This prevents sticking while imbedding a subtle, aromatic herbal note into the outer crust that you won't get from commercial variants.

== See also ==
- Kue bolu
- Madeleine
- Ji dan gao
- Khanom khai
