= Jajan pasar =

Traditional cakes from Java, Indonesia

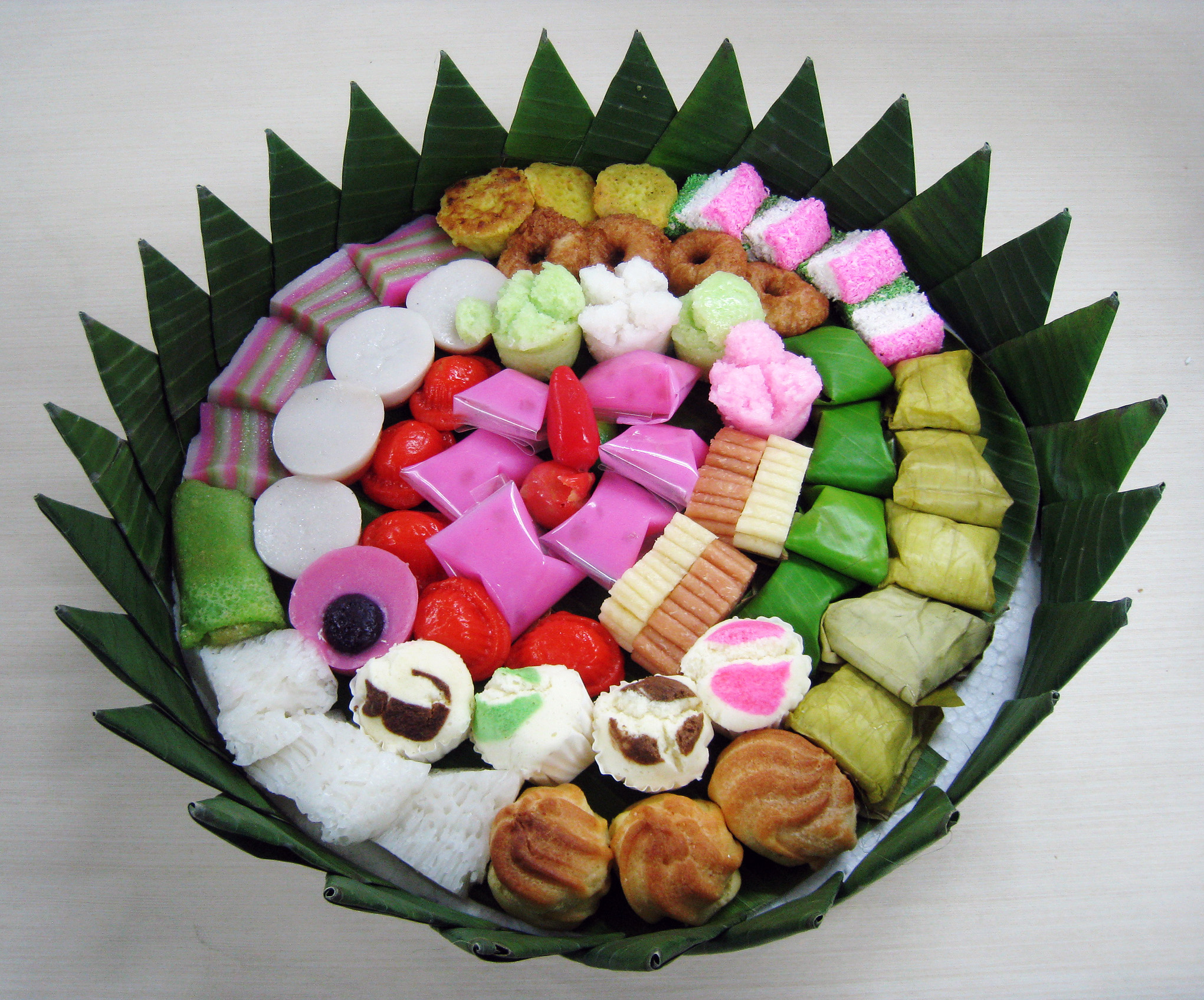
Jajan pasar in Jakarta, Indonesia

Jajan pasar (Javanese: market snacks) refers to traditional Javanese cakes sold in Javanese markets.

== Etymology ==
Jajan in Javanese can mean 1) to buy food; or 2) snacks/food for sale, while pasar means "market", specifically traditional market. Jajan pasar thus means "snacks/food sold in the market".

A number of different types of snacks sold in traditional markets in Java: jajan pasar, kue, bolu, and roti. Jajan pasar refers to native Javanese snacks; kue (from Chinese gao; kwe) refers to western cakes and steamed cakes of Chinese origin; bolu (from Portuguese bolo) refers to sponge cakes and other types of cakes with a similar texture; while roti (from Sanskrit rotika) refers to baked goods in general.

However, in urban areas, the word "kue" is used to refer to all kinds of food products mentioned above. This happened due to a strong influence of Chinese descendants' language use in the areas. More than 90% of Chinese descendants in Indonesia (who may not speak fluent Chinese but would incorporate some Chinese words into their speech) live in the cities, where the Indonesian language is spoken as a lingua franca. The word "kue" was later adopted into the "Great Indonesian Dictionary" (KBBI) to refer to all kinds of snacks, no matter the origins.

The use of kue instead of jajan pasar, has become increasingly widespread as more suburbs and villages become urbanized, blurring the lines between what constitutes as ethnic Javanese food and what's considered peranakan (Chinese-influenced); something that might come across as cultural erasure.

== Types of Jajan ==
- Klepon
- Arem-arem
- Lemper
- Serabi
- Nagasari
- Mendoan
- Jenang
- Gethuk
- Putu mayang

== See also ==
- Kue
- Roti
- Kue bolu
- Javanese cuisine
- Javanese diaspora
- Javanese culture
