= Laksamana mengamuk =

Indonesian cold drink

- Course: Beverage
- Place of origin: Indonesia
- Region or state: Riau
- Serving temperature: Cold
- Main ingredients: Kwini mango, coconut milk, sugar and mineral water

Laksamana mengamuk (lit. 'raging admiral') (Jawi: لقسامان مڠماوق) is a traditional iced drink from the Malay community of Riau, Indonesia, made from sliced kwini mango served in sweetened coconut milk with ice.

== History and etymology ==
Local folklore links the name to a tale about an admiral (laksamana) who, enraged after a domestic dispute, rampaged through a kwini orchard owned by a landlord, leaving the fruit scattered. Nearby villagers mixed the chopped kwini with coconut milk and palm or white sugar, creating a refreshing drink that was then shared by the community. The episode is cited as the origin of the drink's name and recipe.

== Ingredients and preparation ==
The main ingredients are ripe kwini mango, coconut milk, and sugar syrup, often scented with pandan leaves nd served over ice. A common household method is to simmer coconut milk with sugar and pandan leaves, allow it to cool, then pour it over sliced kwini with ice. Other versions follow similar proportions and preparation steps, using freshly pressed coconut milk and ice, while some simpler variations include only kwini, grated coconut, sugar, water, and ice.

== Variations ==
In Riau, variations of the drink are sometimes prepared when kwini fruit is out of season. Some versions include young coconut flesh and basil seeds, while others use different varieties of mango but retain the coconut-milk base. The drink is commonly served during the month of Ramadan across Riau, especially as a refreshment for breaking the fast.

== See also ==
- Cuisine of Indonesia
- List of Indonesian desserts
- List of Indonesian dishes
- List of Indonesian snacks
- Malay cuisine
