= Bubur kacang hijau =

Indonesian dessert

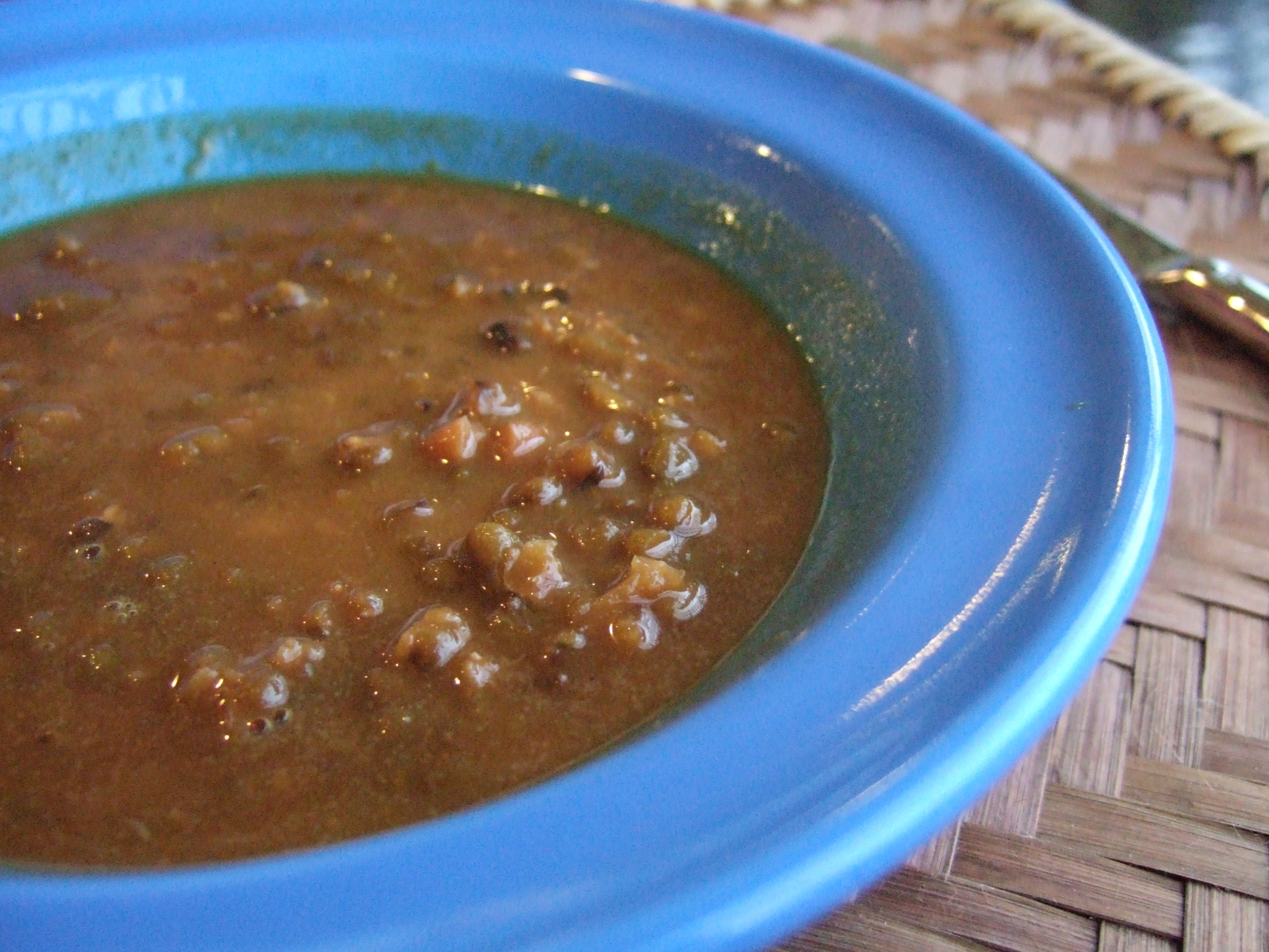
- Bubur kacang hijau
- Alternative names: Bubur kacang hejo (su); Bubur kacang ijo (jv); Burjo
- Region or state: Southeast Asia
- Main ingredients: Mung beans, coconut milk, palm sugar or cane sugar

Bubur kacang hijau, abbreviated burjo, is a Southeast Asian sweet porridge (bubur) made from mung beans (kacang hijau), coconut milk, and palm sugar or cane sugar. The beans are boiled till soft, and sugar and coconut milk are added.

Slightly different names may be used in different regions of Indonesia, such as kacang ijo in Javanese areas. It is often served as dessert or snack, but is also a popular choice for breakfast or late night supper. In Indonesia, warungs specializing in selling bubur kacang hijau are commonly found. They usually also offer grilled bread (roti bakar).

== Variants ==
The most basic variant of bubur kacang hijau only consists of mung bean porridge, coconut milk and palm sugar. Bubur kacang hijau may also be served with black glutinous rice (ketan hitam) and bread. Black glutinous rice can also be made into bubur ketan hitam.

Sometimes bubur kacang hijau is mixed with durian. It is served as is or together with bread.

Bubur kacang hijau is usually eaten warm, but can be served cold as es kacang hijau in Indonesia or ais kacang hijau in Malaysia. Es and ais mean "ice".

== Gallery ==
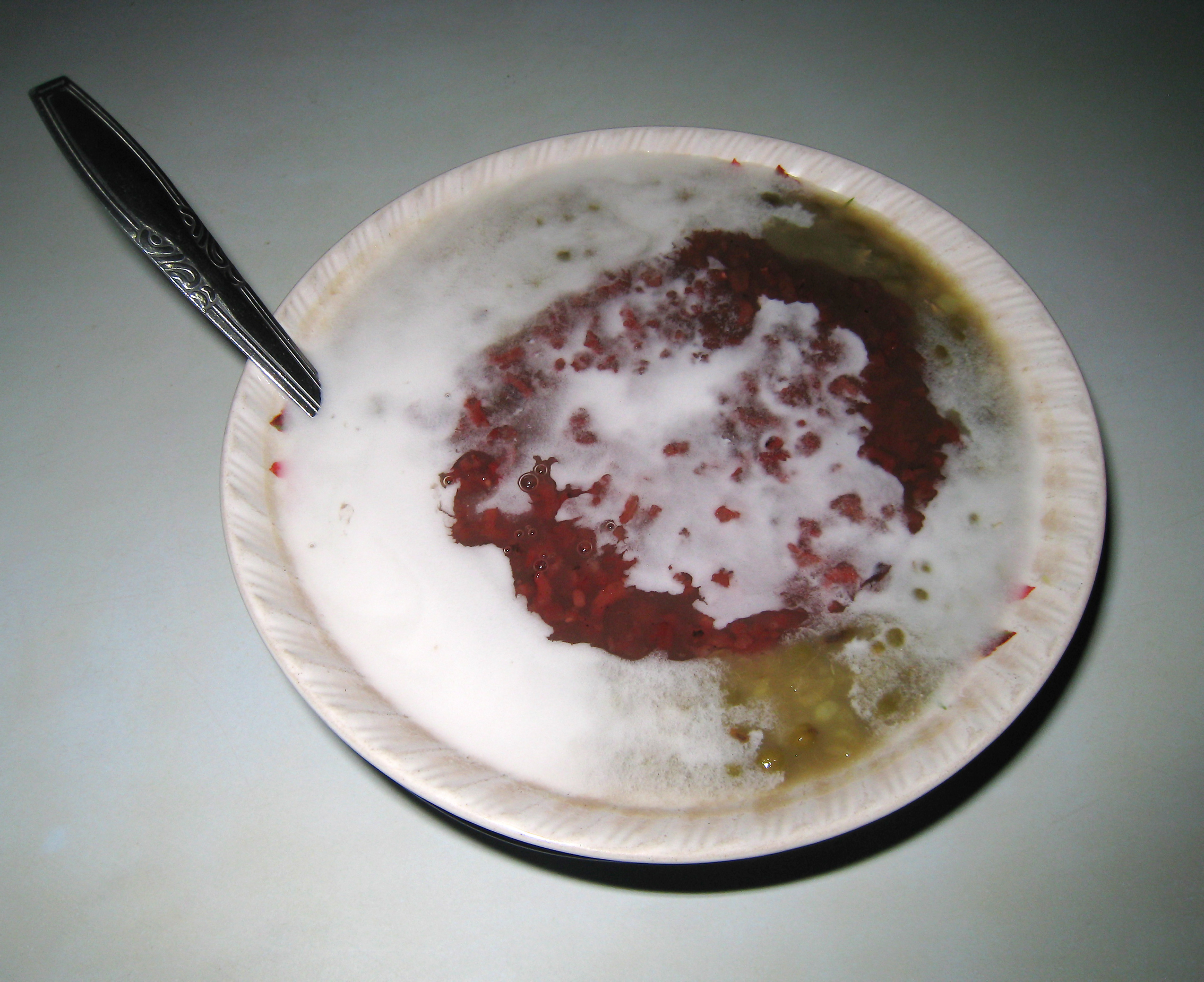
Bubur kacang hijau mixed with ketan hitam and coconut milk

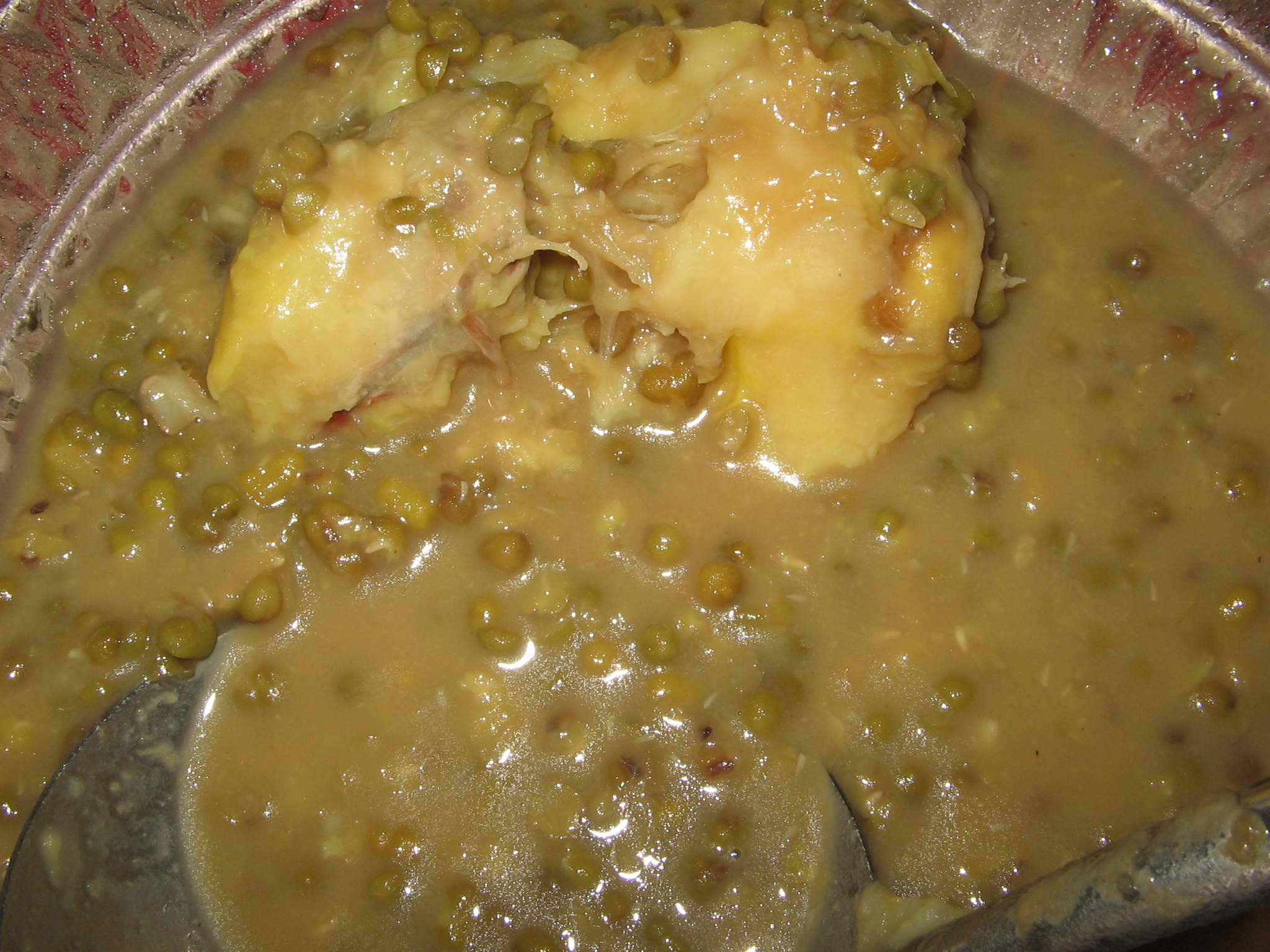
Bubur kacang hijau with durian

== See also ==
- Bubur cha cha
- List of desserts
- List of legume dishes
- List of porridges
- Red bean paste
