= Es puter =

Indonesian frozen dessert

Es puter, Es dung dung (also written as es dong dong, es tung tung, and es tong tong) or Es podeng is a dessert dish from Indonesia similar to ice cream made from coconut milk instead of milk. Es puter has a rough texture and is traditionally frozen using a tube-shaped tool that is rotated in ice cubes and salt.
