= Bubur ketan hitam =

Indonesian dessert

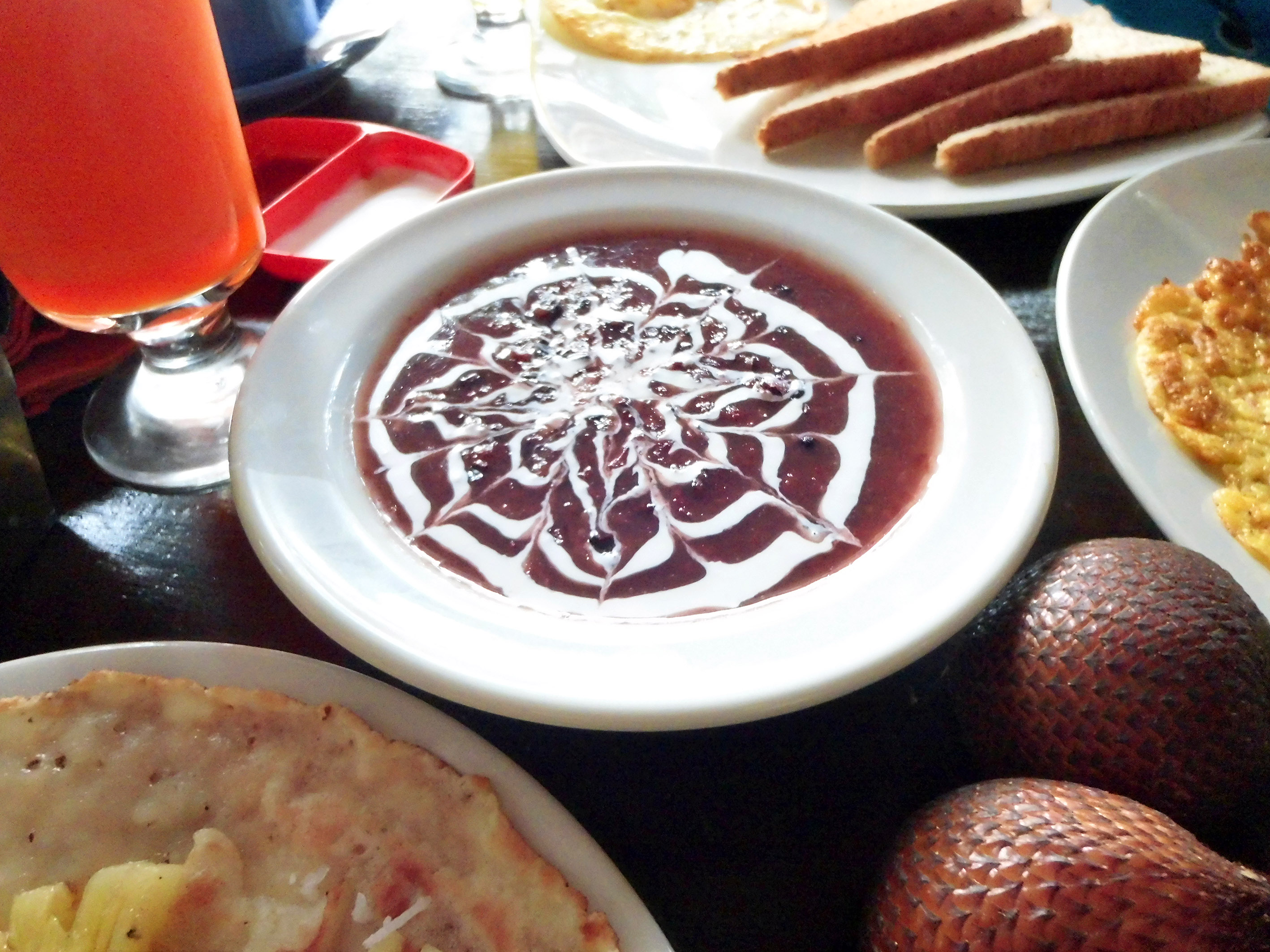
- Bubur ketan hitam served with thick coconut milk served in Bali, Indonesia.
- Alternative names: Bubur pulut hitam
- Place of origin: Indonesia
- Region or state: Java
- Main ingredients: Black glutinous rice, coconut milk, palm sugar or cane sugar

Bubur ketan hitam, bubur pulut hitam or bubur injun (English: black sticky rice porridge) is an Indonesian sweet dessert made from black glutinous rice porridge with coconut milk and palm sugar or cane sugar. The black glutinous rice are boiled until soft, and sugar and coconut milk are added. It is often described as "black glutinous rice pudding" and is very similar to black rice tong sui made from black rice. It is often served as dessert or snack, for supper, for tea time, any time of the day; however, it is a popular choice for breakfast for those who prefer sweet treats instead of its savory counterpart bubur ayam.

== Names ==
It is sometimes referred to simply as ketan hitam or pulut hitam, meaning "black glutinous rice", while bubur means porridge in Indonesian and Malay. In most parts of Indonesia, glutinous rice is called ketan, while in Malaysia and also Sumatra in Indonesia, it is called pulut. Slightly different names may be used in various regions of Indonesia, such as ketan item or ketan ireng in Javanese areas, and bubuh injin or bubuh injun in Bali. Other than porridge, black glutinous rice is also can be made into fermented delicacies called tapai.

== History ==
Bubur Ketan Hitam or Black sticky rice porridge is a traditional Indonesian dish with deep historical roots, dating back to the Majapahit era (13th to 16th centuries). During the Majapahit era, dishes made from black sticky rice were commonly served in traditional ceremonies and religious rituals, as black sticky rice was considered a special ingredient and symbol of prosperity.

In ancient Javanese tradition, Bubur ketan hitam was often included as part of offerings to ancestors and gods. This dish also has philosophical meanings, symbolizing fertility and gratitude to nature. Over time, black sticky rice porridge has evolved into a popular everyday dish due to its sweet and rich taste. The tradition of enjoying this dish continues to be preserved to this day.

== Variants ==
The most basic variant of bubur ketan hitam only consists of black glutinous rice porridge sweetened with palm sugar. While coconut milk, pandan leaves and a pinch of salt might be added to give aroma. However, in most parts of Indonesia, bubur ketan hitam is always served with kacang hijau (mung beans), and accompanied with bread. This black glutinous rice and mung beans combo is often simply called bubur kacang hijau. Sometimes, a more fancy restaurant's variant is served with additional toppings, such as slices of baked or fried banana, or cinnamon powder.

== Gallery ==
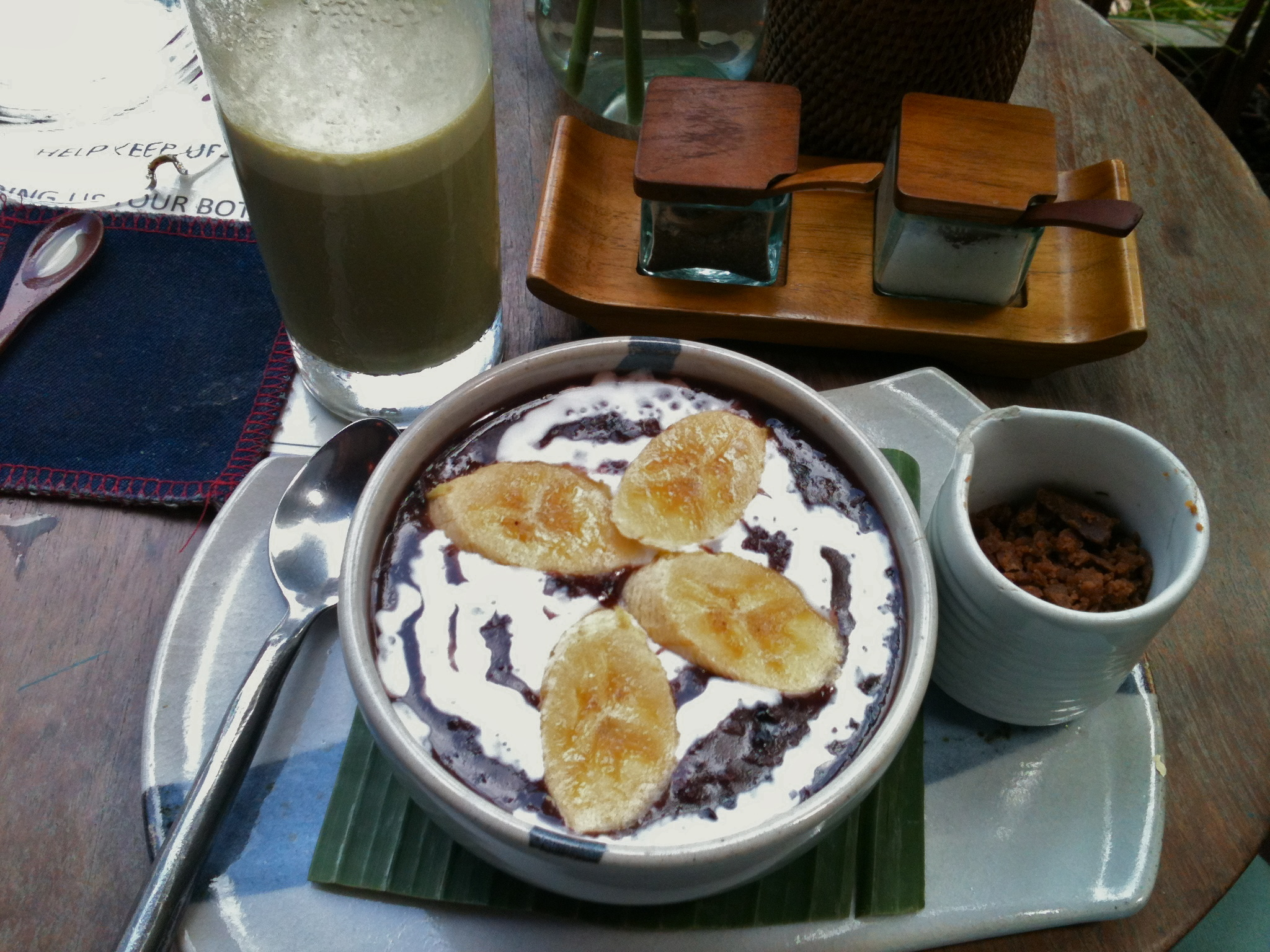
Bubur ketan hitam served with thick coconut milk and sliced baked banana.

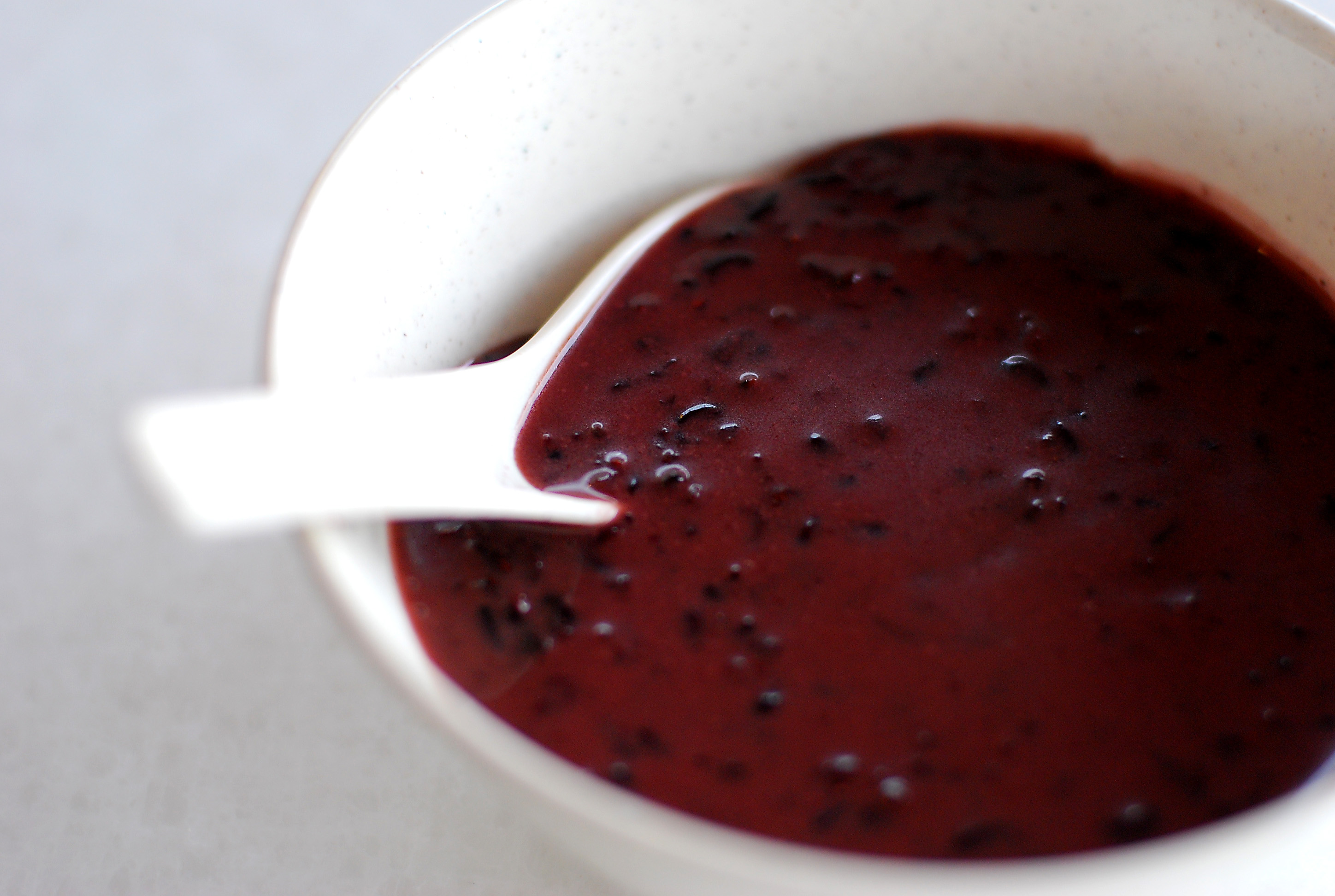
Plain bubur pulut hitam without coconut milk in Malaysia.

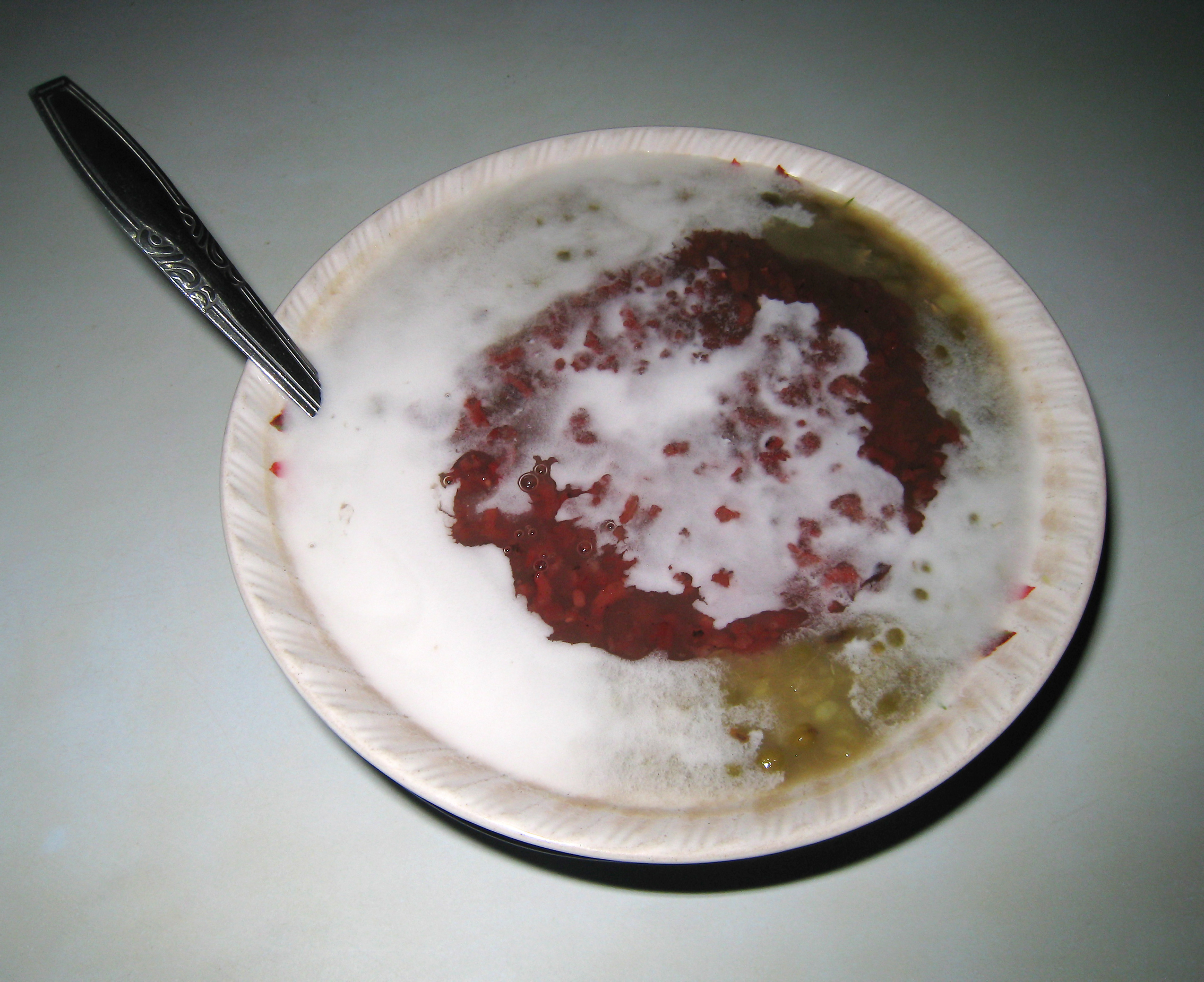
Bubur kacang hijau with ketan hitam combo is common in Indonesia.

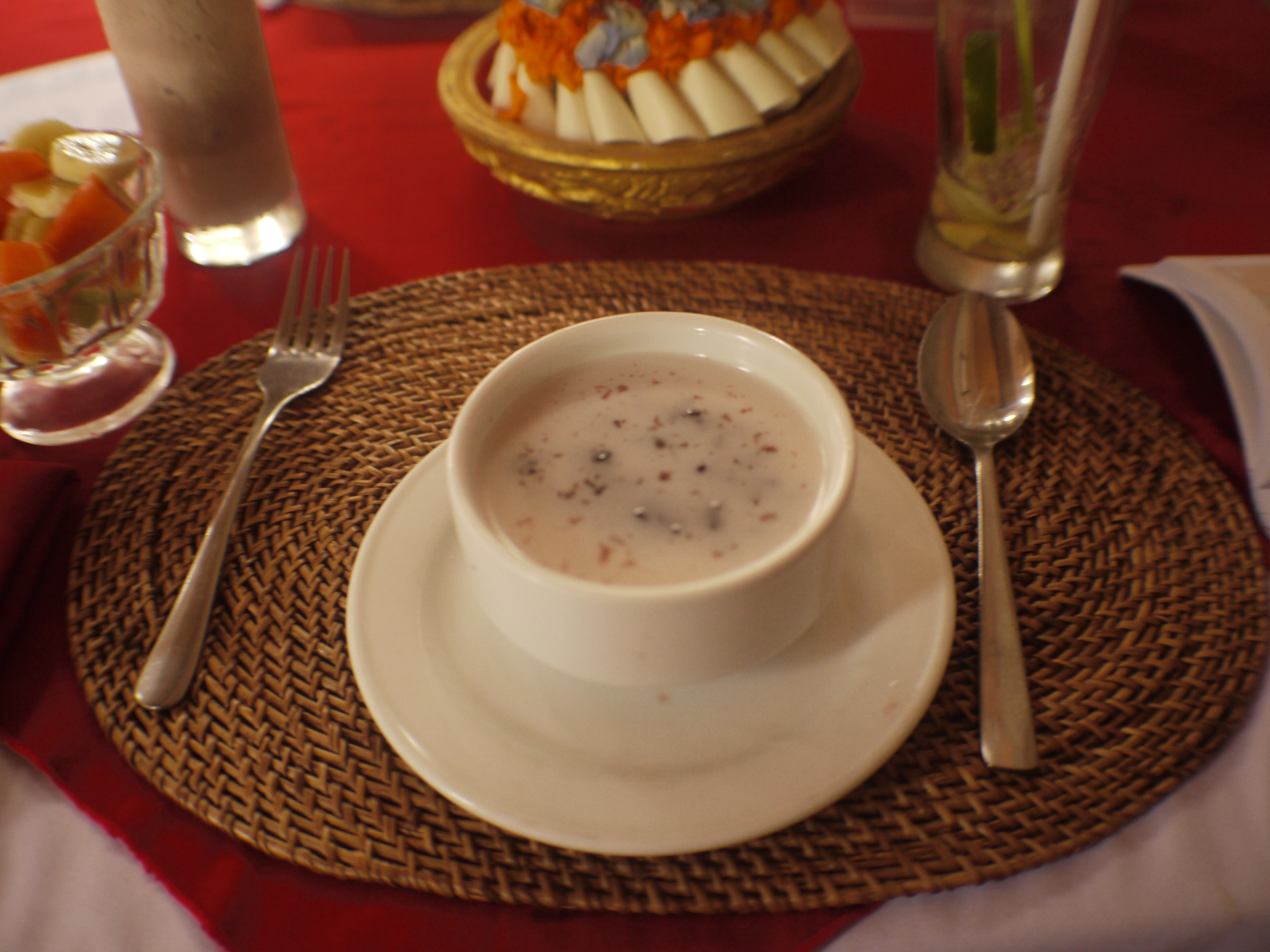
Bubur ketan hitam with coconut milk in Bali, Indonesia.

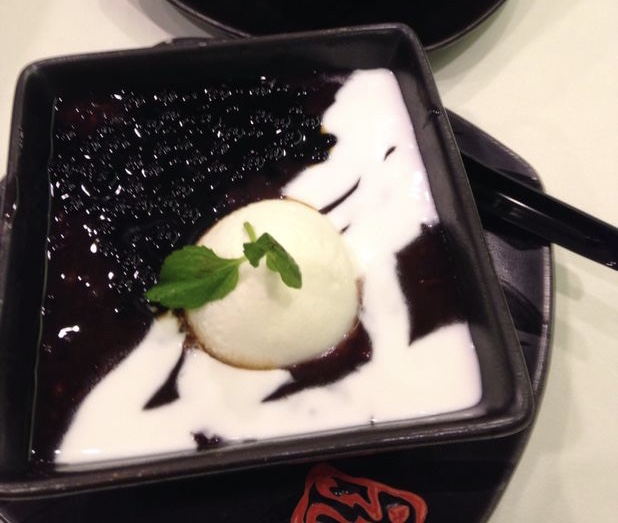
Black glutinous rice porridge served at a Hong Kong dessert shop

== See also ==
- Bubur cha cha
- Champorado
- List of desserts
- List of porridges
