= Ting-ting jahe =

Indonesian ginger candy

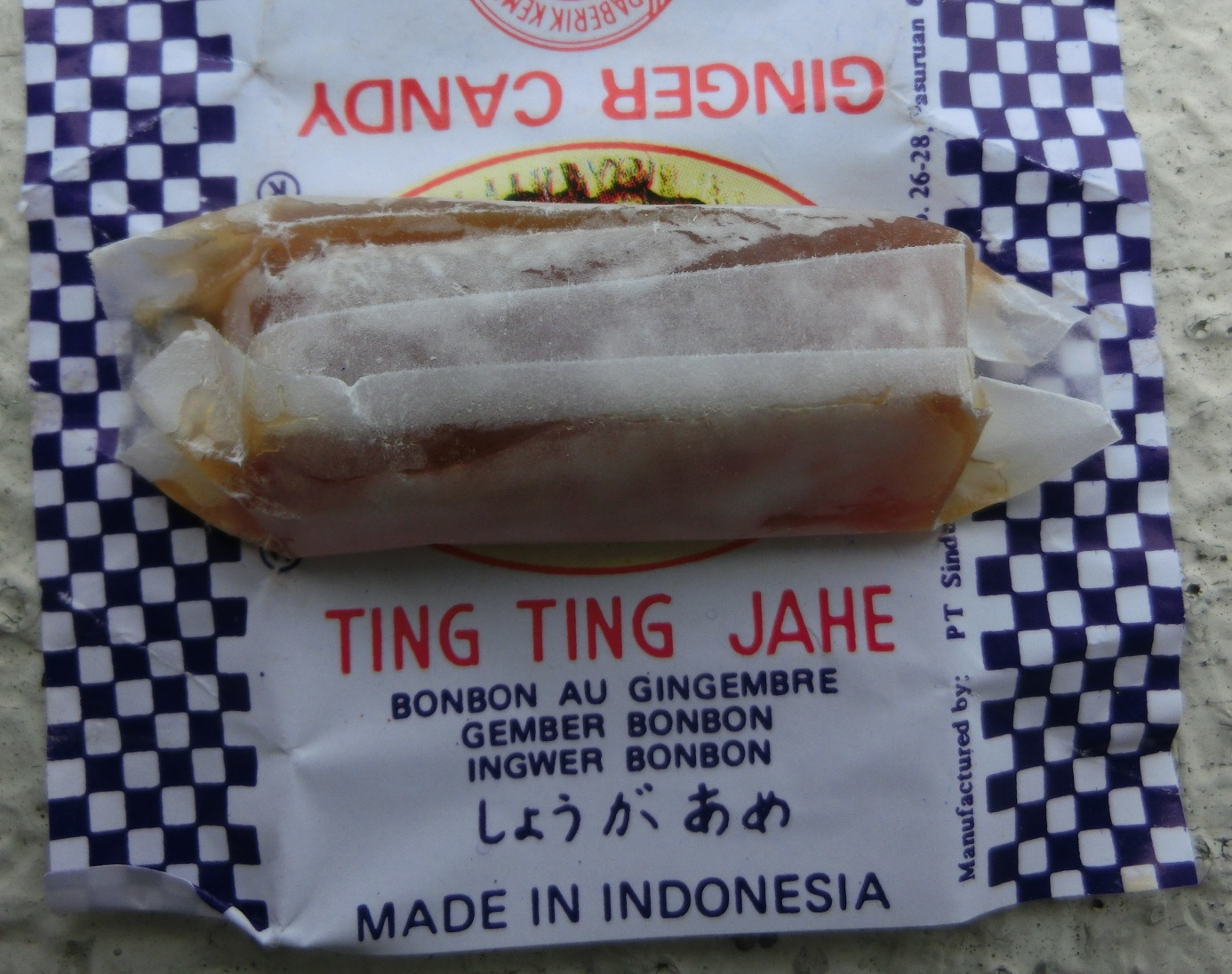
Ting Ting Jahe

Ting Ting Jahe is a chewy ginger candy made in Indonesia. It contains cane sugar, ginger (7%) and tapioca starch. Saveur identified the candy in 2000 as one of the hottest products for the next century.
