= Nagasari =

Indonesian steamed cake

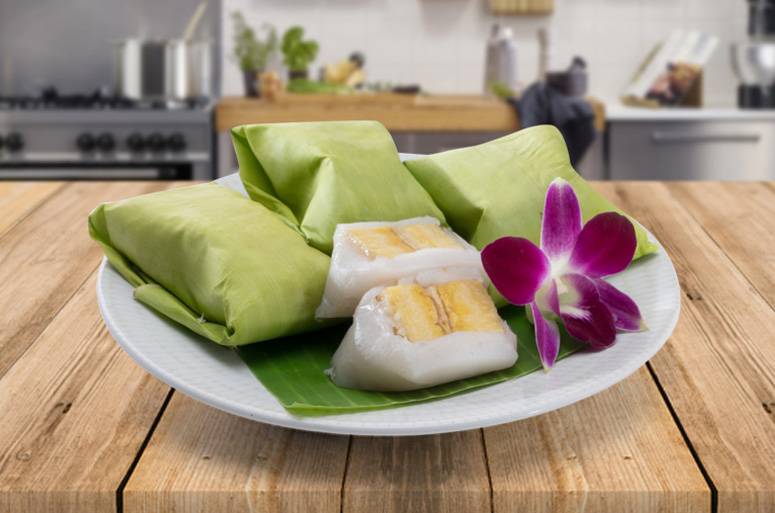
- Nagasari, Indonesian traditional cake wrapped in banana leaves
- Course: Snack
- Place of origin: Indonesia
- Region or state: Java
- Serving temperature: Room temperature
- Main ingredients: Steamed rice flour with sugar filled with banana and wrapped inside banana leaf
- Variations: Green, white, blue.

Nagasari is a traditional Indonesian steamed cake, originating from Javanese cuisine, made of rice flour, coconut milk and sugar, filled with a slice of banana and wrapped in banana leaves.

== Etymology ==
Naga in Javanese language means "a big snake; a dragon". It refers to a mythical green snake in the Old Java that brings fertility to the earth. The word is derived from a Sanskrit word naga. Sari means "beautiful; fertile; patient" or "seed; flower".

Nagasari literally means "the seed of the dragon" or "the beautiful dragon". Since the Javanese dragon is often depicted as a green snake, the food is thus given green color.

The word nagasari can also refer to: 1) a specific tree; 2) a specific batik pattern.

== Variants ==
Nagasari comes in green color (the most common) and white (less common). The green color comes from pandan leaves extract. White nagasaris are called legendo in Magelang.

In modern time, people start making different colors of nagasari. Blue nagasari, among them, gets its blue color from butterfly pea flowers.

Nagasari is commonly sold in Indonesian traditional market as a jajan pasar.

In Suriname, which has a significantly large Javanese population, it's pronounced nogosari and consists of rice flour with bananas that are steamed in banana leaf packets.

== See also ==
- List of steamed foods
- Javanese cuisine
- Indonesian cuisine
