= Kue mangkok =

Indonesian steamed cupcake

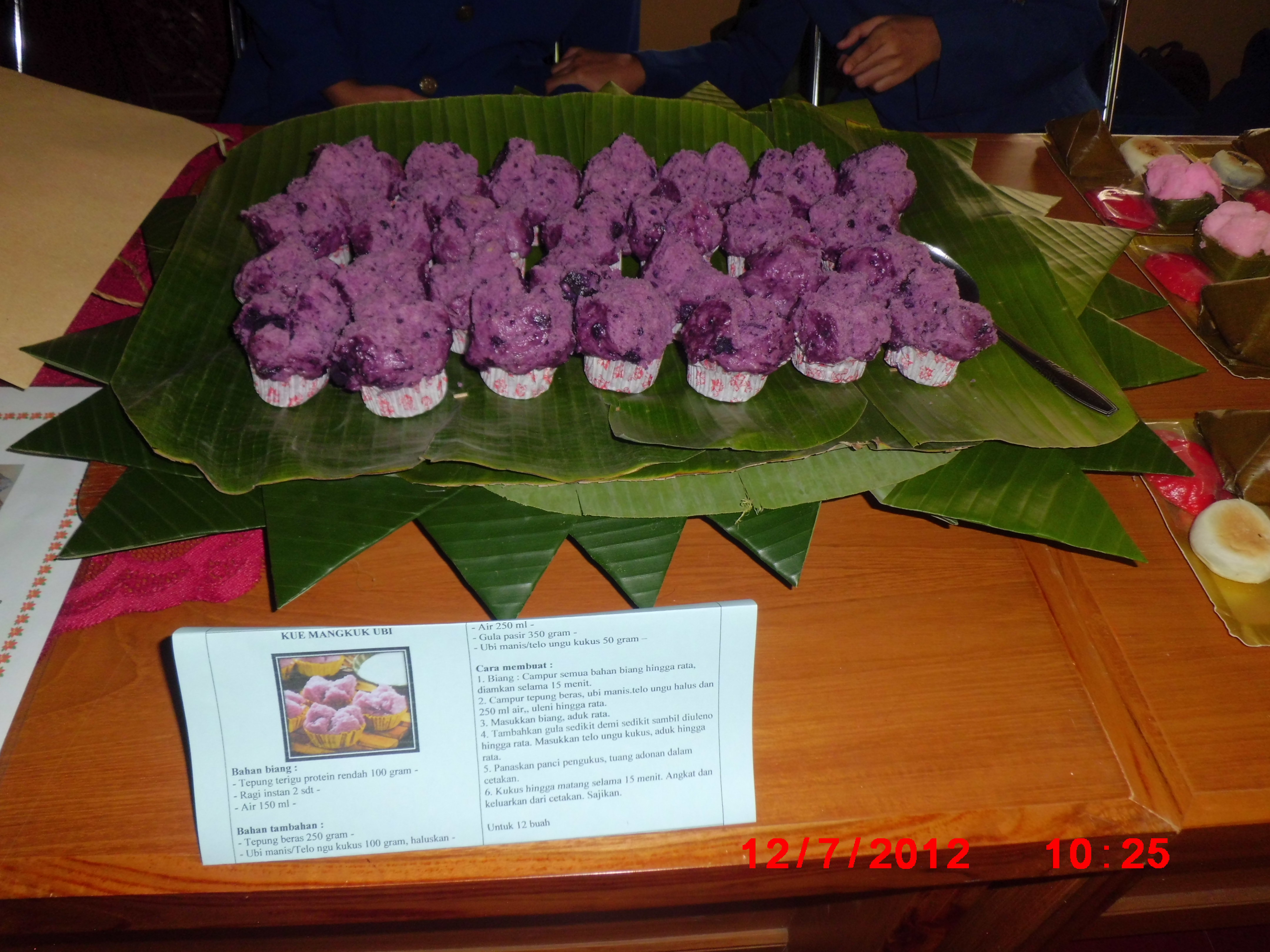
- Purple taro kue mangkok
- Alternative names: Kue mangkuk or bolu kukus
- Type: Cupcake
- Course: Dessert
- Place of origin: Indonesia
- Region or state: Nationwide
- Serving temperature: Warm or room temperature
- Main ingredients: Flour, rice flour, sugar, baking powder, flavouring, steamed

Kue mangkok or kue mangkuk is an Indonesian kue or traditional snack of steamed cupcake. Kue mangkok means "bowl/cup cake". It is similar to the snack bolu kukus ("steamed tart/cake"). While both have a similar appearance, bolu kukus requires few ingredients to make (usually around four to five), whereas kue mangkok requires more than a dozen in most recipes. The result is a different texure: bolu kukus is soft and fluffy, while kue mangkok has a rough, often chewy and sticky texture.

== Ingredients, cooking method and variants ==
Its dough is made of the mixture of flour, rice flour and sagoo (tapioca), yeast, egg, coconut milk, sugar and salt. Traditional kue mangkok might be sweetened with palm sugar, thus creating brownish color. Other traditional variant might uses tape singkong or tapai (fermented cassava), or using ubi (sweet potato) or talas (taro). The dough is placed into some tin or stainless steel cupcake containers or small bowls, and then steamed until the top part of the cakes are rising, expanding and blossoming like a flower. The top is cracking into four petal-like lumps. The texture is somewhat soft and firm and slightly moist compared to common cupcake. Kue mangkok might be sprinkled with grated coconut on top of it.

== Bolu kukus ==
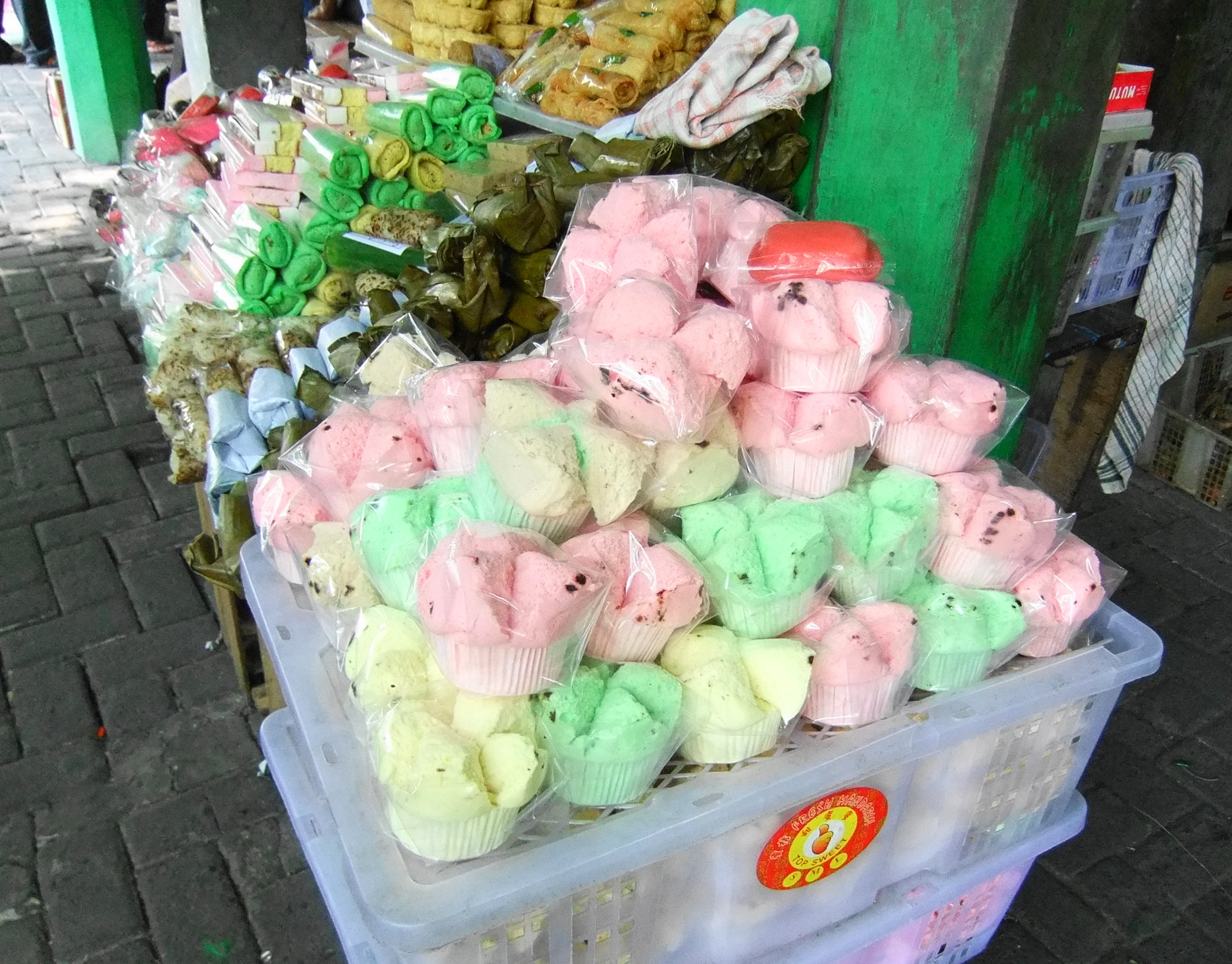
Bolu kukus sold in a market

The term bolu kukus (steamed tart) however, usually refer to a type of kue mangkuk that mainly only uses wheat flour (without any rice flour and tapioca) with common vanilla, chocolate, or strawberry flavouring, acquired from food flavouring essence.

== See also ==
- Kue apem
- List of steamed foods
