= Ketoprak (dish) =

Indonesian vegetarian dish

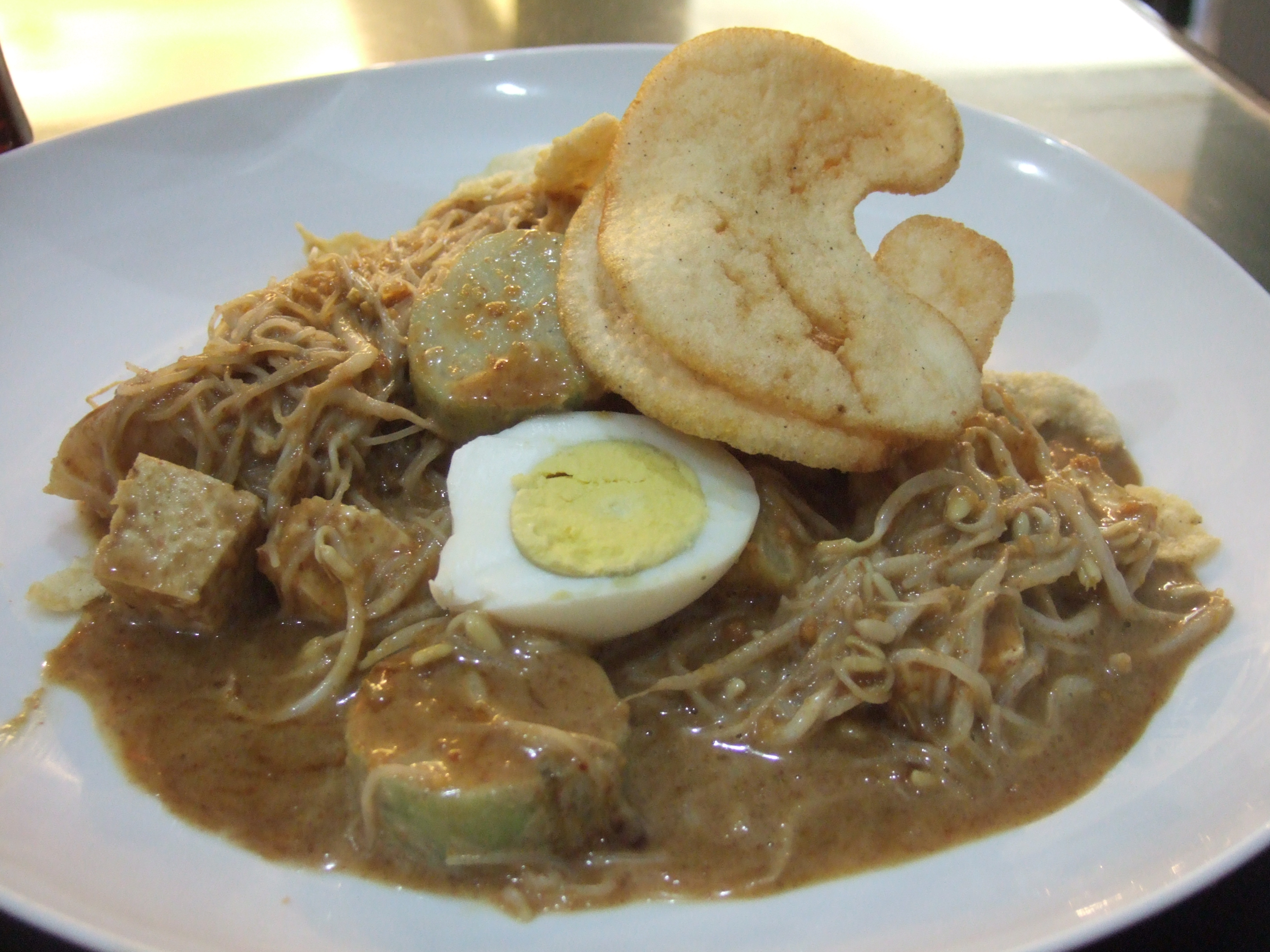
- Ketoprak sold in Jakarta
- Course: Main and snack
- Place of origin: Indonesia
- Region or state: Jakarta
- Serving temperature: Hot (for fried tofu), and room temperature (other ingredients)
- Main ingredients: fried tofu, steamed rice cake (lontong or ketupat), bean sprouts, rice vermicelli, cucumber, served in peanut sauce and sweet soy sauce, topped with krupuk and fried shallots

Ketoprak is an Indonesian vegetarian dish from Jakarta, consisting of tofu, vegetables, rice cake, and rice vermicelli served in peanut sauce.

== Etymology and origin ==
The etymology of the name ketoprak is unknown, and its name similarity to the Javanese folk-drama is peculiar. However, according to popular Betawi tradition, ketoprak was actually derived from the acronym of ketupat tahu digeprak, to refer its ingredients; which are ket from ketupat, to from tahu and toge, and prak from digeprak (Betawi for: "mashed" or "crushed"), which describes the method on grinding garlic, chili pepper and peanut granules together to create the peanut sauce. It is also believed that a man who loved eating invented the dish because he grew tiresome of the food he had normally eaten. When he dropped the dish on to the floor, the plate made the sound "ketuprak", which is where he got the idea for the name.

In addition to its unique name, ketoprak is also unique in that all the street vendors use the same design for their carts. The vendors arrange and use all their tools in the same manner. A ketoprak wagon always has a stainless pan, a frying pan at the end of the cart, a used biscuit can for crackers, and a wooden pestle and mortar.

Today, ketoprak is often associated with Jakarta as the dish is more easily available in this city compared to others. However, there is a debate on whether or not it actually originated in Jakarta. Some has claimed that the dish was first made in Cirebon, while others say that it comes from Central Java. As of 2018, no one has discovered where the dish actually originated from. In Jakarta, majority of ketoprak street vendors hailed from the Western Javanese city of Cirebon. In Cirebon, an area famous for its ketoprak is in Pasuketan area. Ketoprak might be derived from a popular Javanese-Sundanese dish kupat tahu (tofu and ketupat), with addition of bihun (rice vermicelli), beansprouts, cucumber and sweet soy sauce.

== Ingredients ==
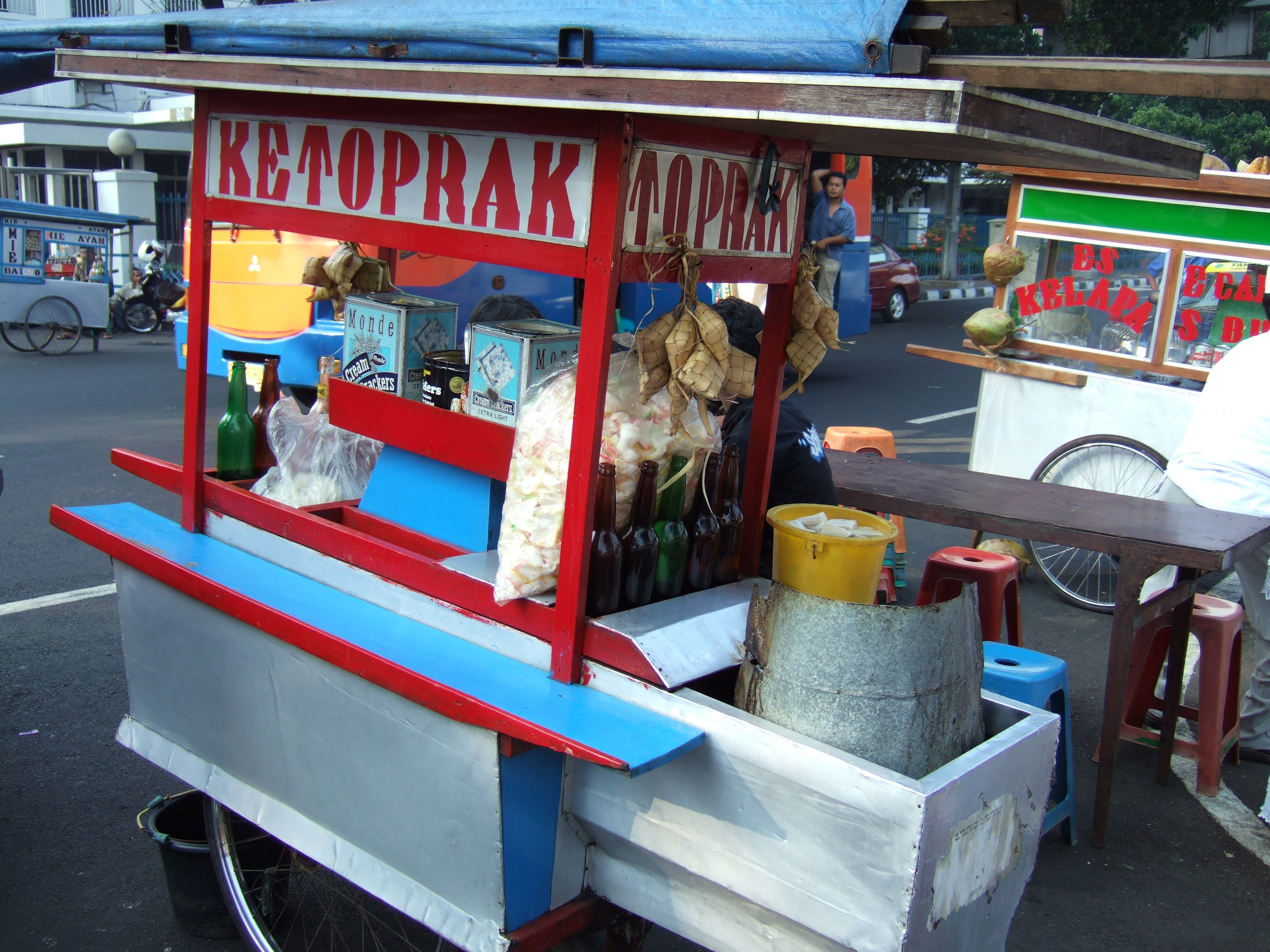
Ketoprak cart

Ketoprak consists of sliced fried tofu, steamed rice cake (lontong or ketupat), sliced cabbage and cucumber, bihun (thin rice vermicelli), bean sprouts, served in peanut sauce, topped with krupuk and fried shallots. The fried tofu can be considered as the centerpiece of the dish, since it is freshly fried directly after customer placed their order, to ensure its freshness and hotness.

The peanut sauce is made from ground peanut and palm sugar made into a thick paste, mixed with garlic, chili pepper, salt and also kecap manis (sweet soy sauce).

== Serving ==
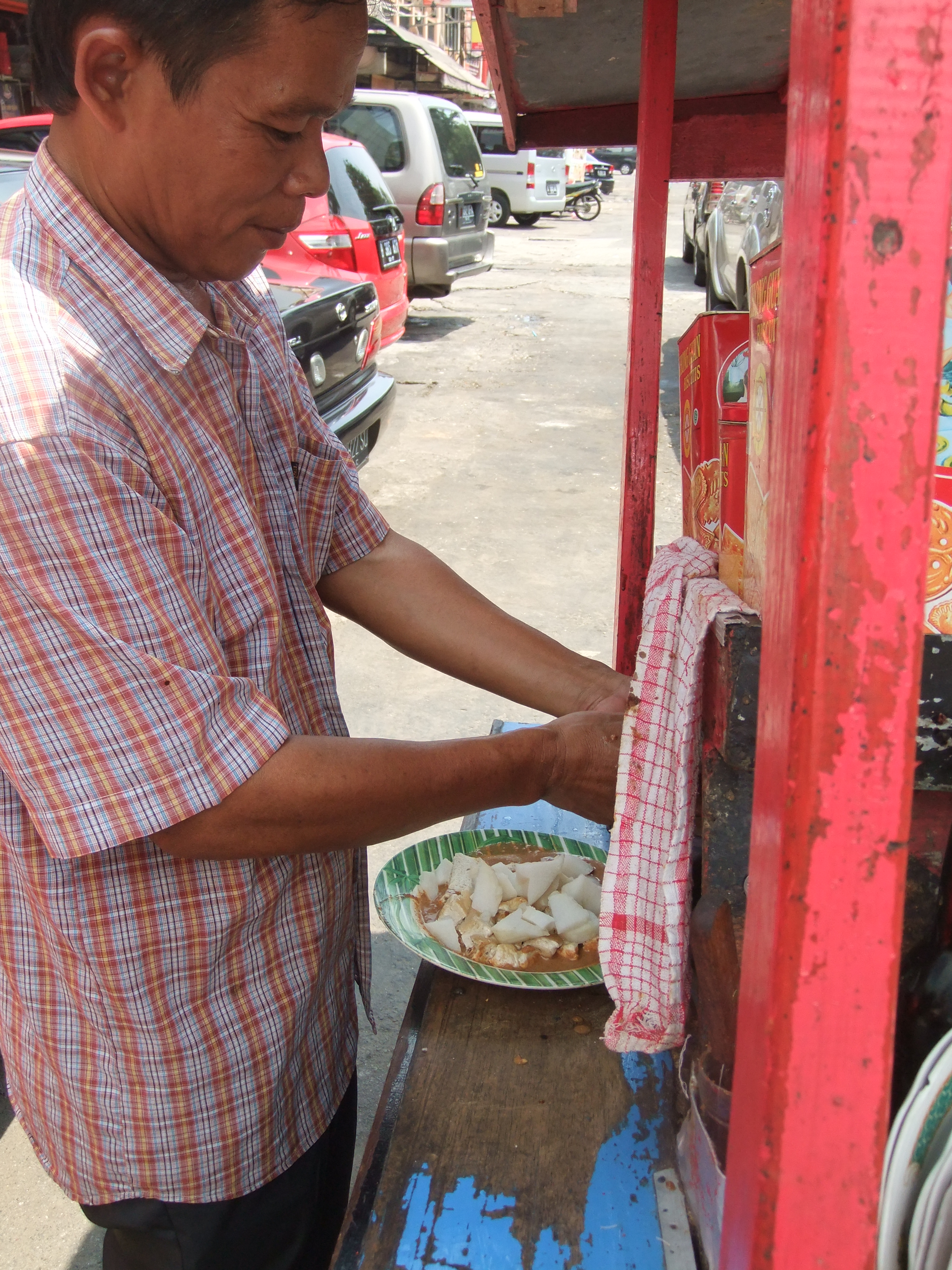
Ketoprak street vendor

Ketoprak is a typical street food. It was originally popular around the Jakarta area but has spread throughout Java. The seller prepares the ingredients at home and mixes them in front of the customers as they place their orders. It is sold in individual portions from small stalls or carts along the street. The cook usually asks the customer their preference on the degree of spiciness: mild, medium, hot or extra hot. The spiciness corresponds to the amount of chili used. The price range is about IDR 8.000 to 15.000 according to outlets and ingredients included. Sometimes, hard boiled egg might be added.

== Similar dishes ==
Ketoprak is nearly similar to kupat tahu, lotek and karedok from West Java, gado-gado from Jakarta and also pecel from Central Java, although the ingredients in the peanut sauces are slightly different. Gado-gado and karedok use only brown sugar for sweetening, but in ketoprak sweet soy sauce is used for additional sweetener, and ground garlic is added. There is also a similar dish from neighboring Singapore called Satay bee hoon.

== See also ==
- Gado-gado
