= Mung bean sprout =

Sprout of the mung bean

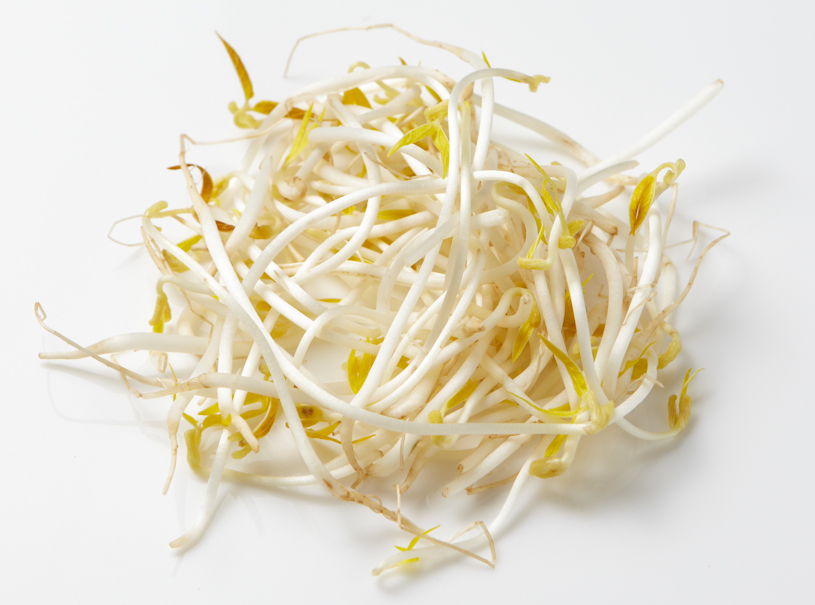

Chinese name
- Traditional Chinese: 豆芽
- Simplified Chinese: 豆芽
- Literal meaning: Bean sprout
Transcriptions
Standard Mandarin
- Hanyu Pinyin: dòuyá
- Wade–Giles: tou^{4} ya^{2}
Southern Min
- Hokkien POJ: tāu-gê

Chinese name (Mandarin)
- Traditional Chinese: 綠豆芽
- Simplified Chinese: 绿豆芽
- Literal meaning: Green bean sprout
Transcriptions
Standard Mandarin
- Hanyu Pinyin: lǜdòuyá
- Wade–Giles: lü^{4} tou^{4} ya^{2}

Chinese name (Cantonese)
- Chinese: 芽菜
Transcriptions
Yue: Cantonese
- Yale Romanization: ngàh choi
- Jyutping: ngaa^{4} coi^{3}

Chinese name (Hokkien)
- Chinese: 豆菜
Transcriptions
Southern Min
- Hokkien POJ: tāu-tshài

Vietnamese name
- Vietnamese: giá đỗ, giá đỗ xanh

Thai name
- Thai: ถั่วงอก
- RTGS: thua ngok

Korean name
- Hangul: 숙주나물
- Literal meaning: Sukju namul
Transcriptions
- Revised Romanization: sukjunamul
- McCune–Reischauer: sukchunamul

Japanese name
- Kanji: 萌やし
- Kana: もやし
Transcriptions
- Revised Hepburn: moyashi

Malay name
- Malay: tauge, tauge halus

Indonesian name
- Indonesian: kecambah, tauge, kecambah kacang hijau, taoge, toge

Filipino name
- Tagalog: toge

Khmer name
- Khmer: សណ្ដែកបណ្ដុះ sândêkbândŏh

Mung bean sprouts are a culinary vegetable grown by sprouting mung beans. They can be grown by placing and watering the sprouted beans in the shade until the hypocotyls grow long. Mung bean sprouts are extensively cultivated and consumed in East and Southeast Asia and are very easy to grow, requiring minimal care other than a steady supply of water.

== Cultivation ==
A variety of techniques are used for sprouting mung beans. A common technique for home growers is sprouting the beans in a jar, with a fine mesh or muslin cloth tied over the top with a rubber band or string. Fresh water is then poured into the jar three to four times a day; the jars are then upturned and left to drain. The precise growing technique to use depends on the amount that one wants to collect. The main principles are: selecting good seed (new and uniform-intact), ensuring that light does not reach the seeds to prevent bitterness, and also ensuring they receive enough humidity while avoiding waterlogging.

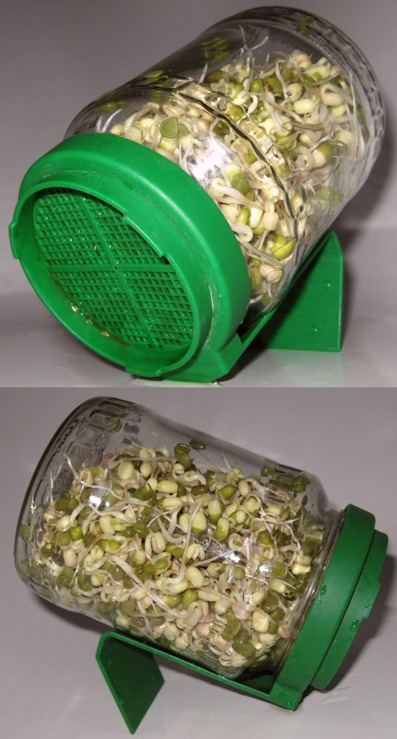
Sprouting mung beans in a jar

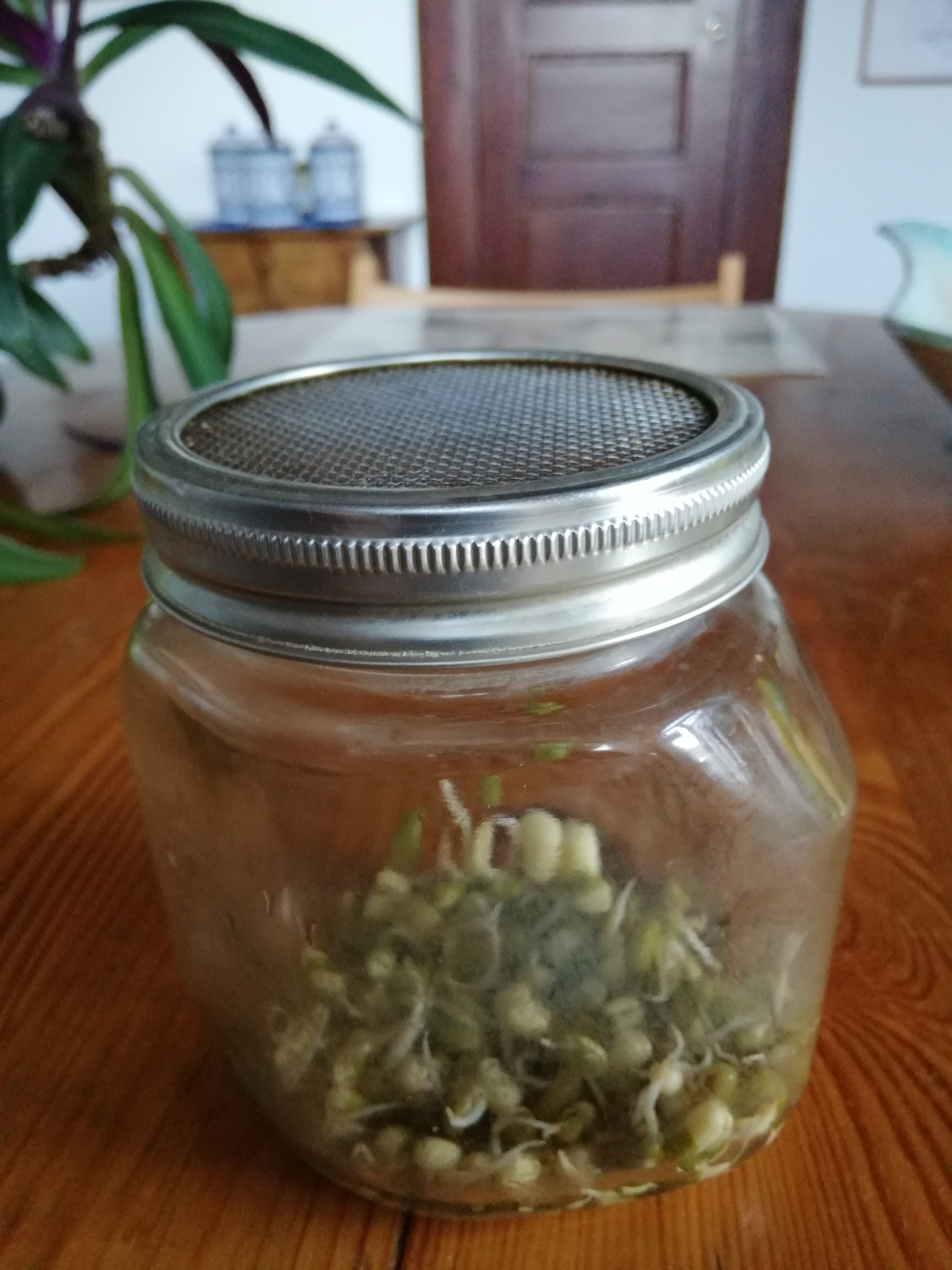

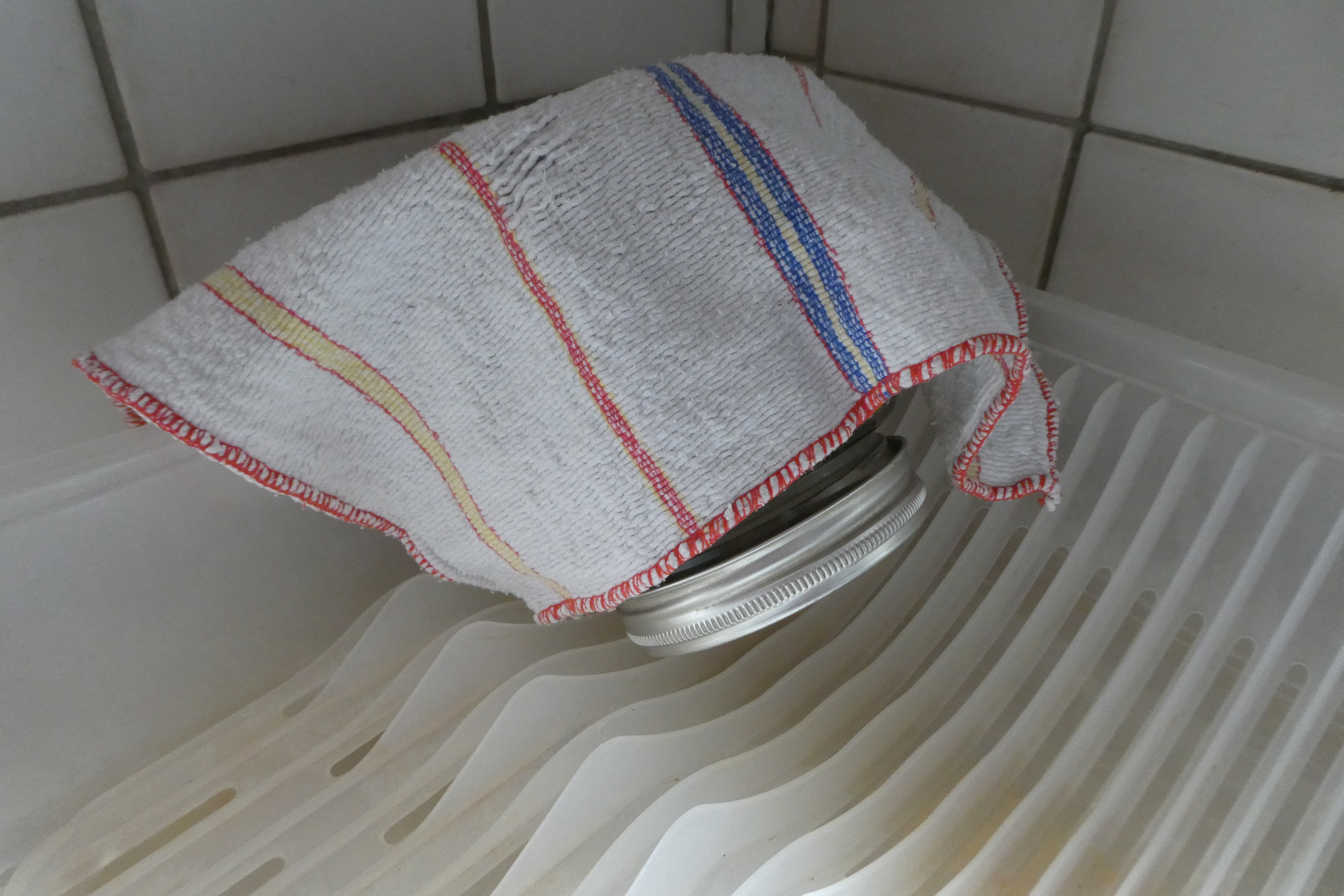

== Culinary use ==
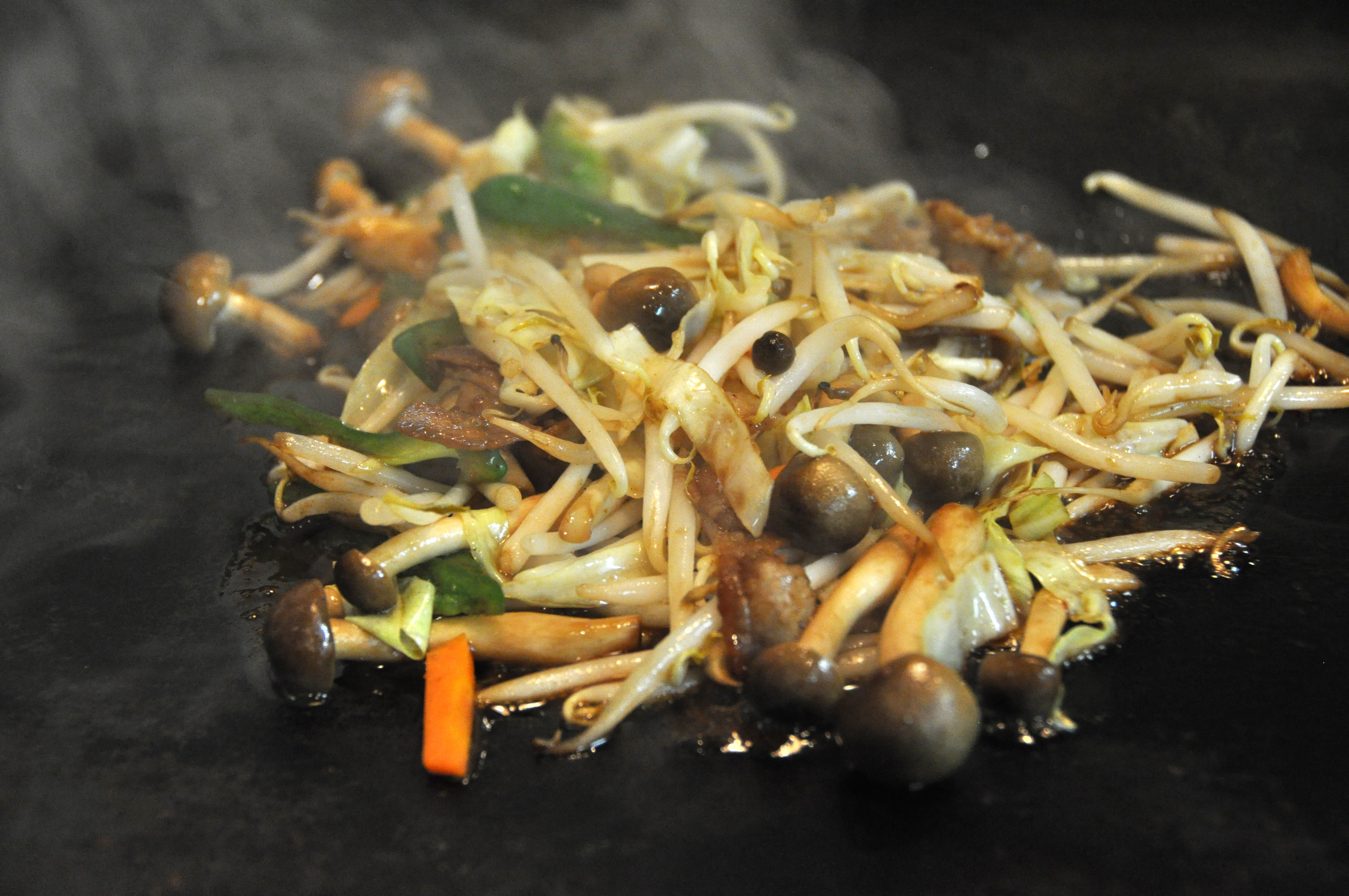
Stir-fried mung bean sprouts and mushrooms

Mung bean sprouts can be cooked similarly to many other vegetables: boiled, steamed, microwaved or stir fried. They may also be used as an ingredient, e.g., for spring rolls.

=== China ===
In Chinese cuisine, common dishes that may use mung bean sprouts, known as dòuyá (豆芽), are fried rice, spring rolls, egg drop soup, and hot and sour soup.

In Cantonese cuisine, bean sprouts are used in dishes such as egg fu yung and beef chow fun.

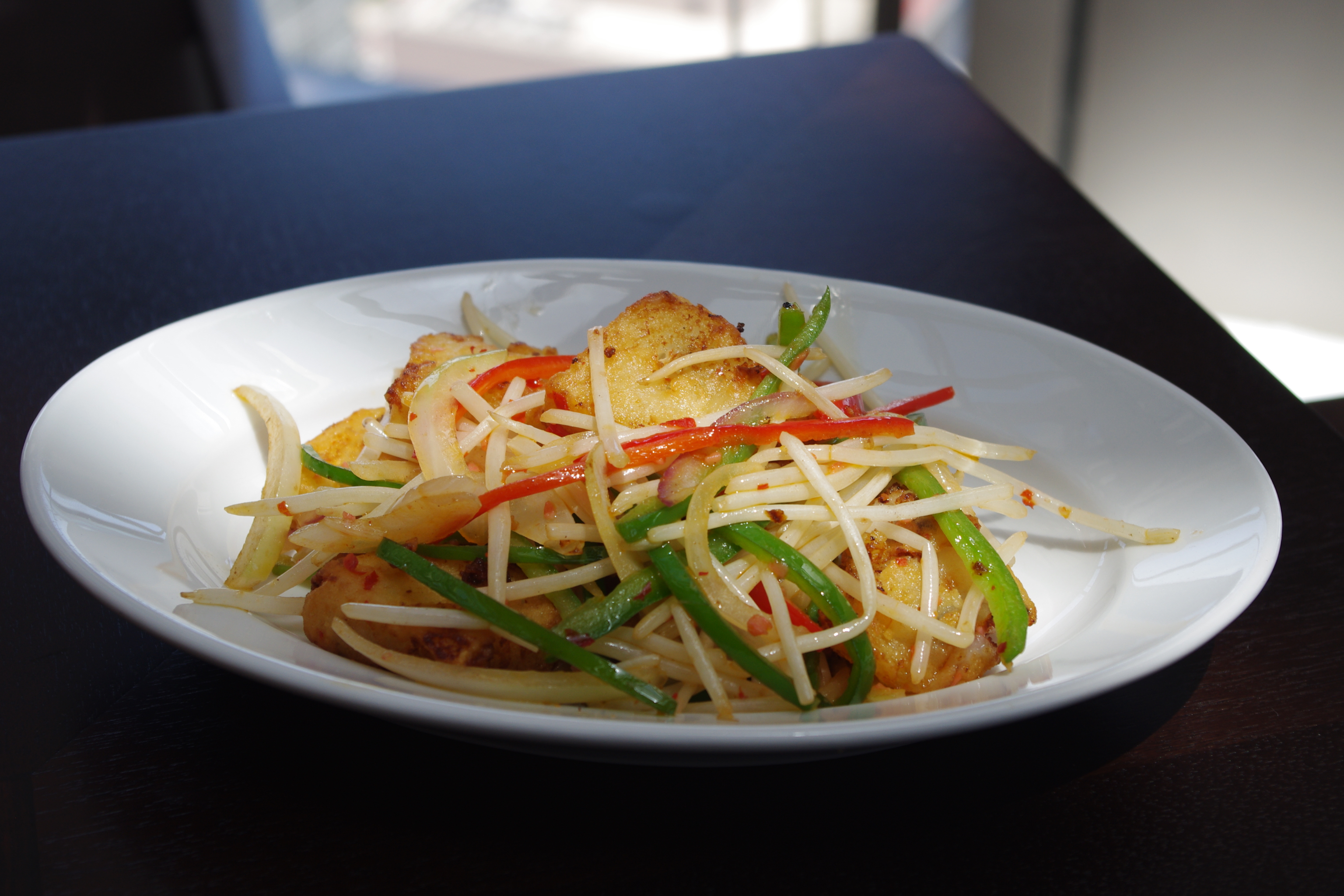
Stir-fried turnip cake and mung bean sprouts

=== India ===
In Indian cuisine, especially in Maharashtrian cuisine, usal is a spicy dish that balances the heat of curry with either mung beans or sprouts.

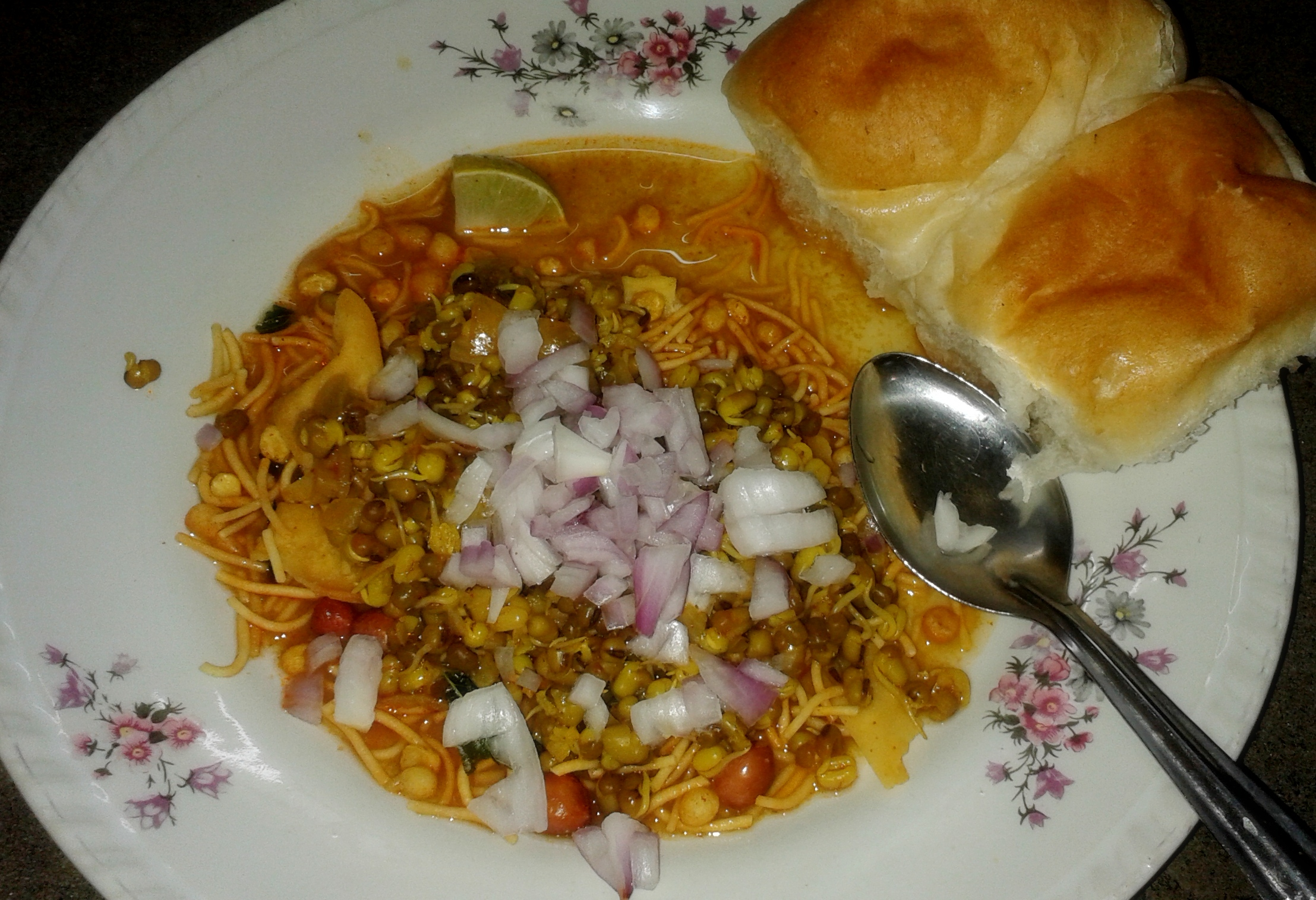
Spicy curry with sev and mung beans

=== Japan ===
In Japanese cuisine, moyashi (もやし, "bean sprout") in a strict sense refers to the mung bean sprout. They are a common ingredient in many Japanese dishes such as stir-fries and soups.

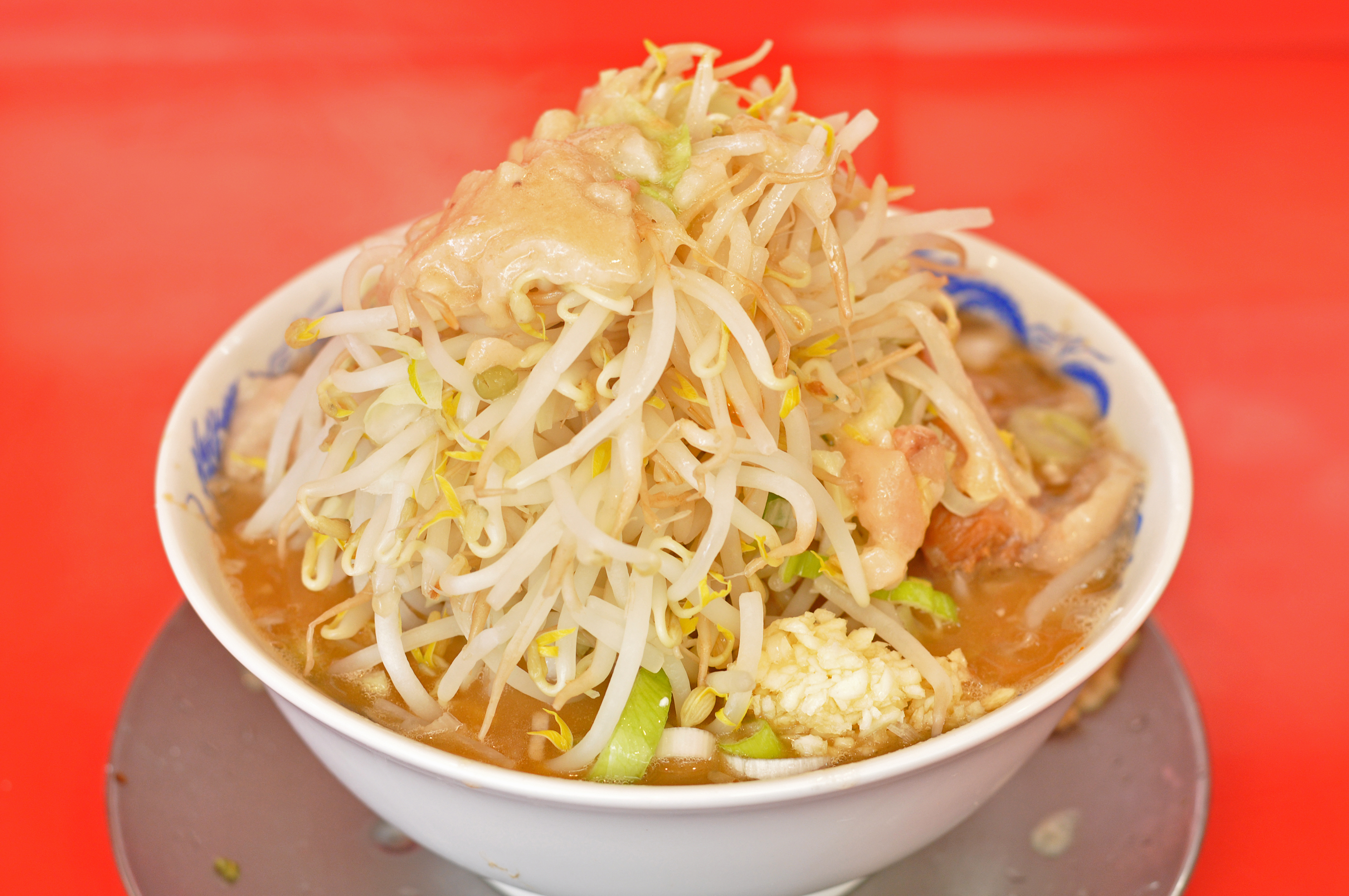
Ramen with mung bean sprout topping

=== Korea ===
In Korean cuisine, sukjunamul (숙주나물) refers to both the mung bean sprouts themselves and the namul (seasoned vegetable dish) made from mung bean sprouts. Mung bean sprouts are not as common an ingredient as soybean sprouts in Korean cuisine, but they are used in bibimbap, in the fillings of dumplings and in sundae (Korean sausage).

The name sukjunamul is a compound of Sukju and namul, of which the former derived from the name of Sin Sukju (1417–1475), one of the prominent Joseon scholars. Sin Sukju betrayed his colleagues and favoured the King's uncle as a claimant to the throne. People regarded Sin Sukju's move as unethical and immoral, and so gave his name to mung bean sprouts, which tend to go bad and spoil very easily.

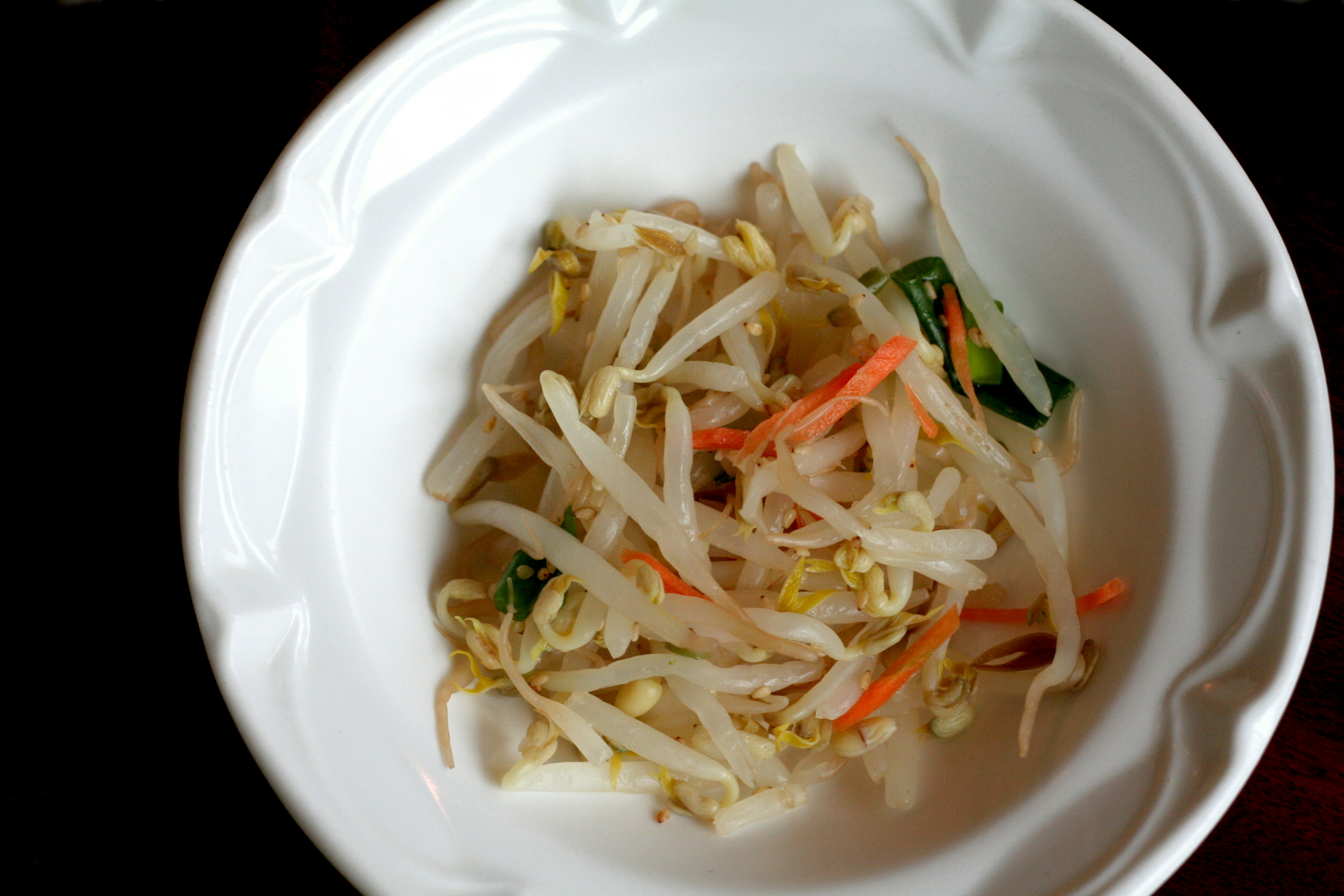
Sukjunamul (seasoned mung bean sprouts)

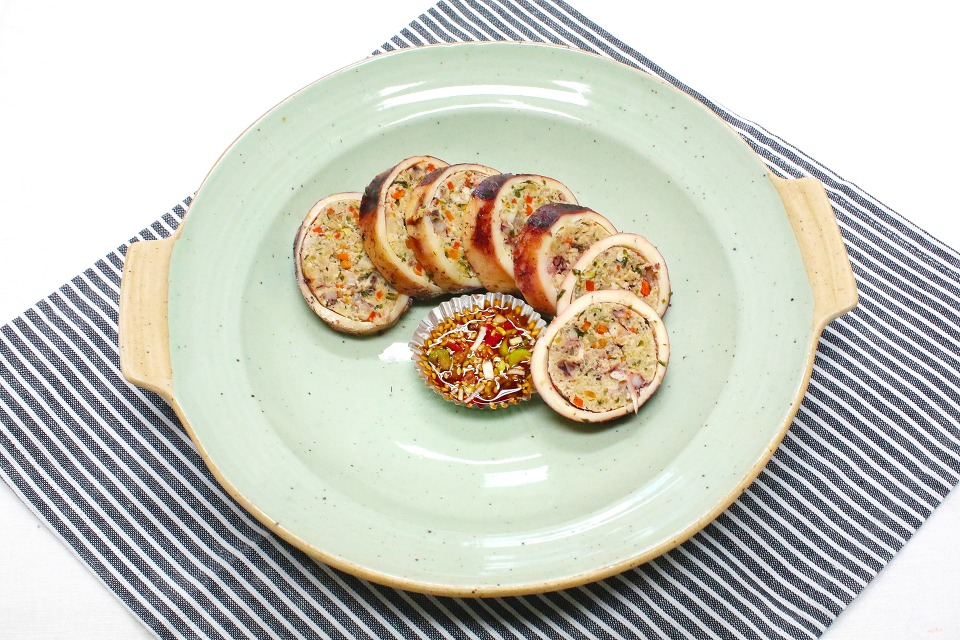
Ojingeo-sundae (squid sundae with mung bean sprouts and other ingredients as filling)

=== Nepal ===
In Nepalese cuisine, kwati, a soup of nine types of sprouted beans, is especially prepared in a festival of Janai Purnima which normally falls in the month of August. Kwati is prepared by frying and mixing onion, garlic, ginger, potatoes, spices and bean sprouts, including mung bean sprouts. A lot of variation exists from house to house but is basically about making the kwati. It is considered to be a nutritious food in Nepal. Kwati is normally eaten with rice. Sometimes meat (esp. fried goat) is also added to spice up the kwati.

=== Thailand ===
In Thai cuisine, mung bean sprouts are usually eaten in soups and stir-fried dishes. In pad thai they are often added to the pan for one quick stir before serving and in soups such as nam ngiao they are sprinkled on top of the dish.

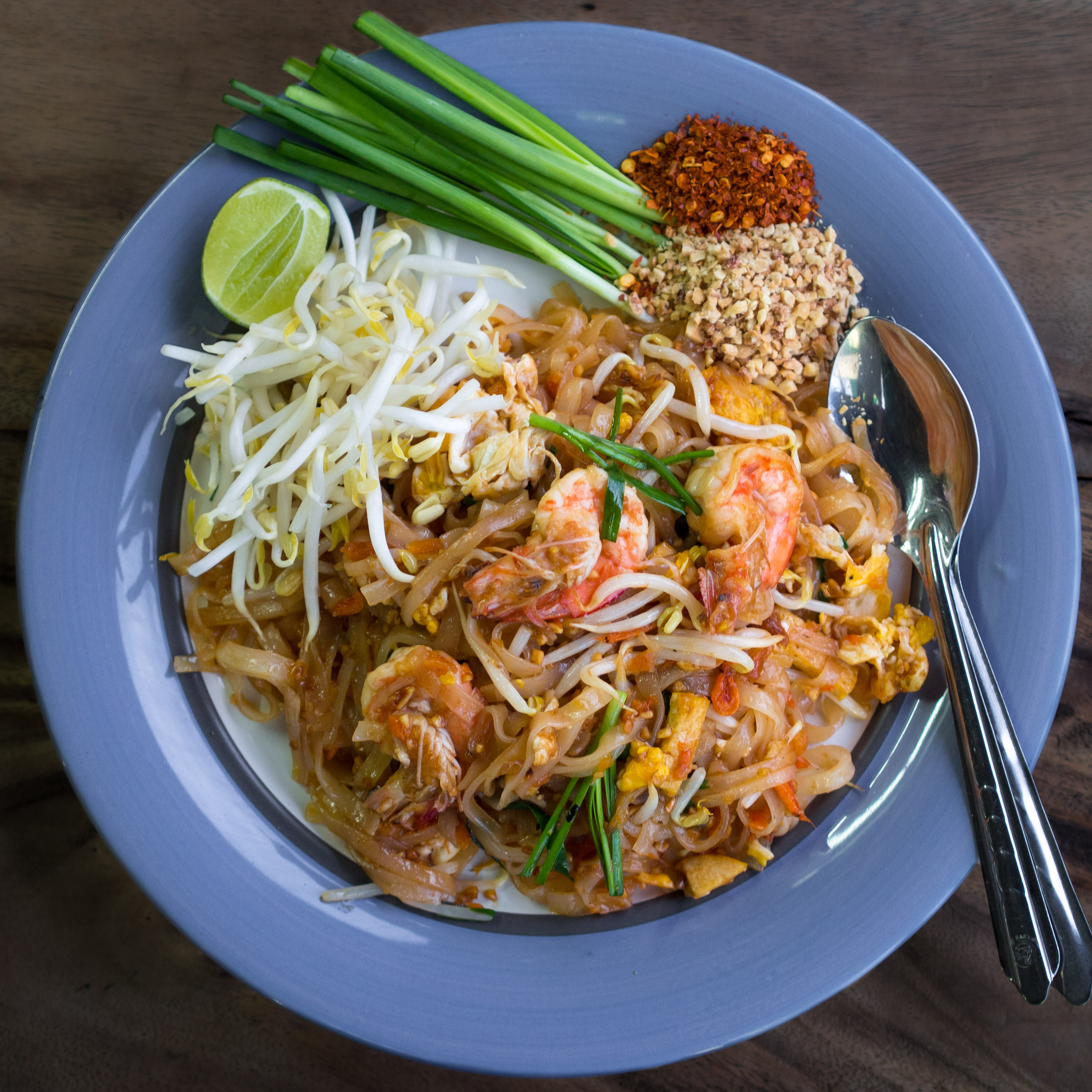
Pad thai served with mung bean sprouts

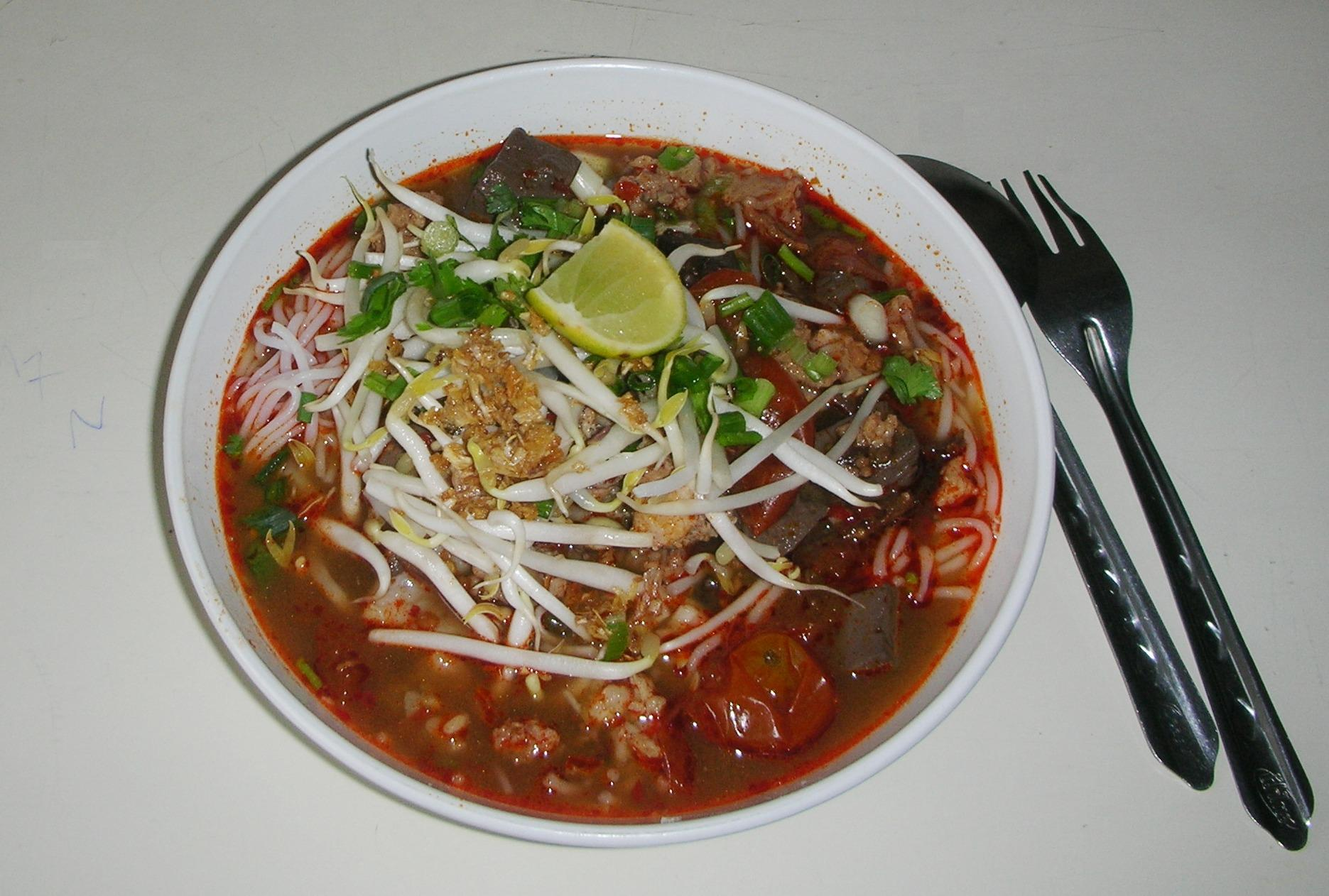
Nam ngiao with mung bean sprouts sprinkled on top

=== Indonesia ===
Mung bean sprouts are used widely in Indonesian cuisine. Mung bean sprouts usually accompany soup dishes such as rawon, mie celor, or soto; are mixed in Indonesian vegetable salads such as pecel, karedok, or gado-gado; and are stir-fried as tauge goreng.

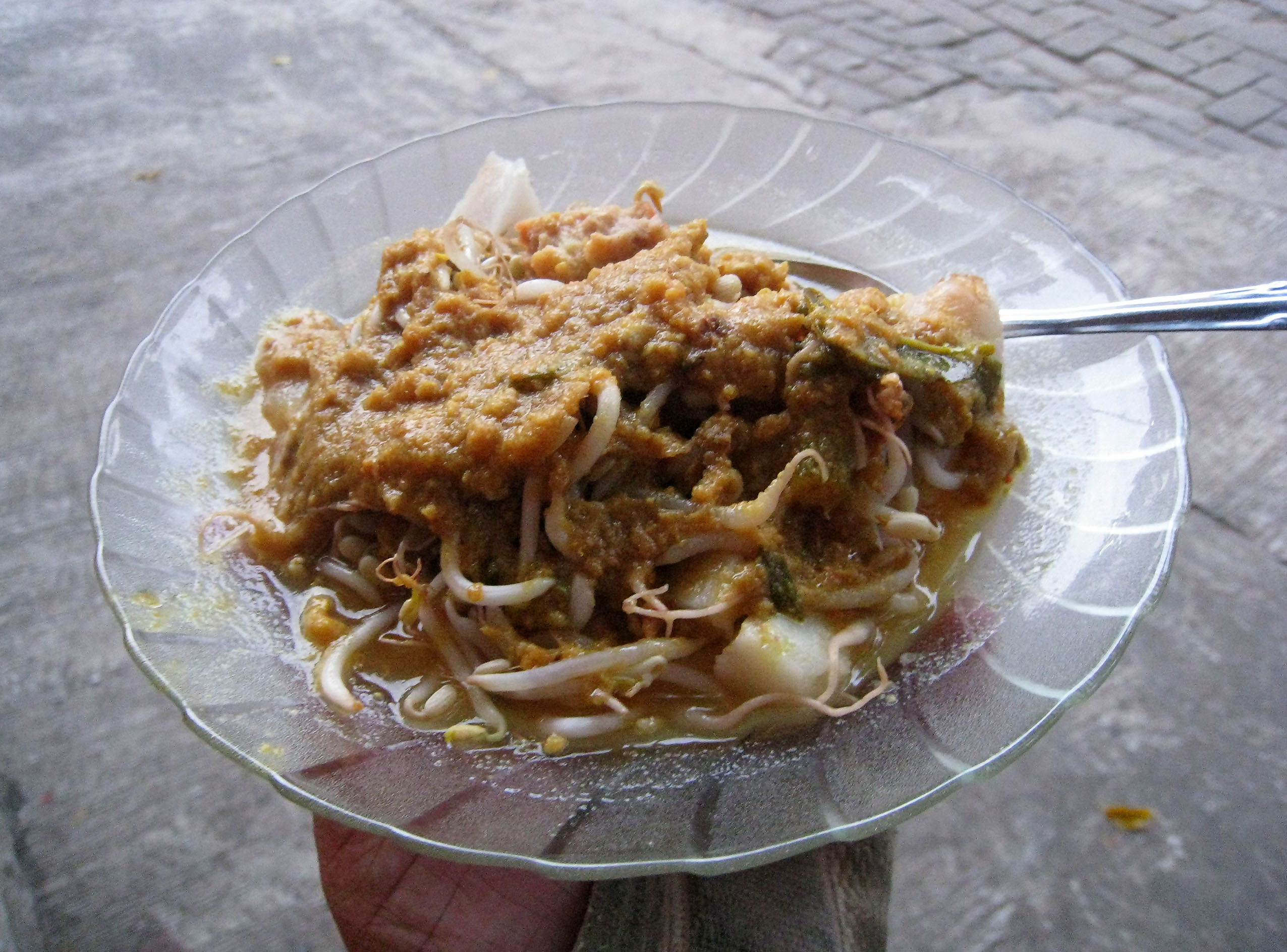
Tauge goreng (stir-fried mung bean sprout)

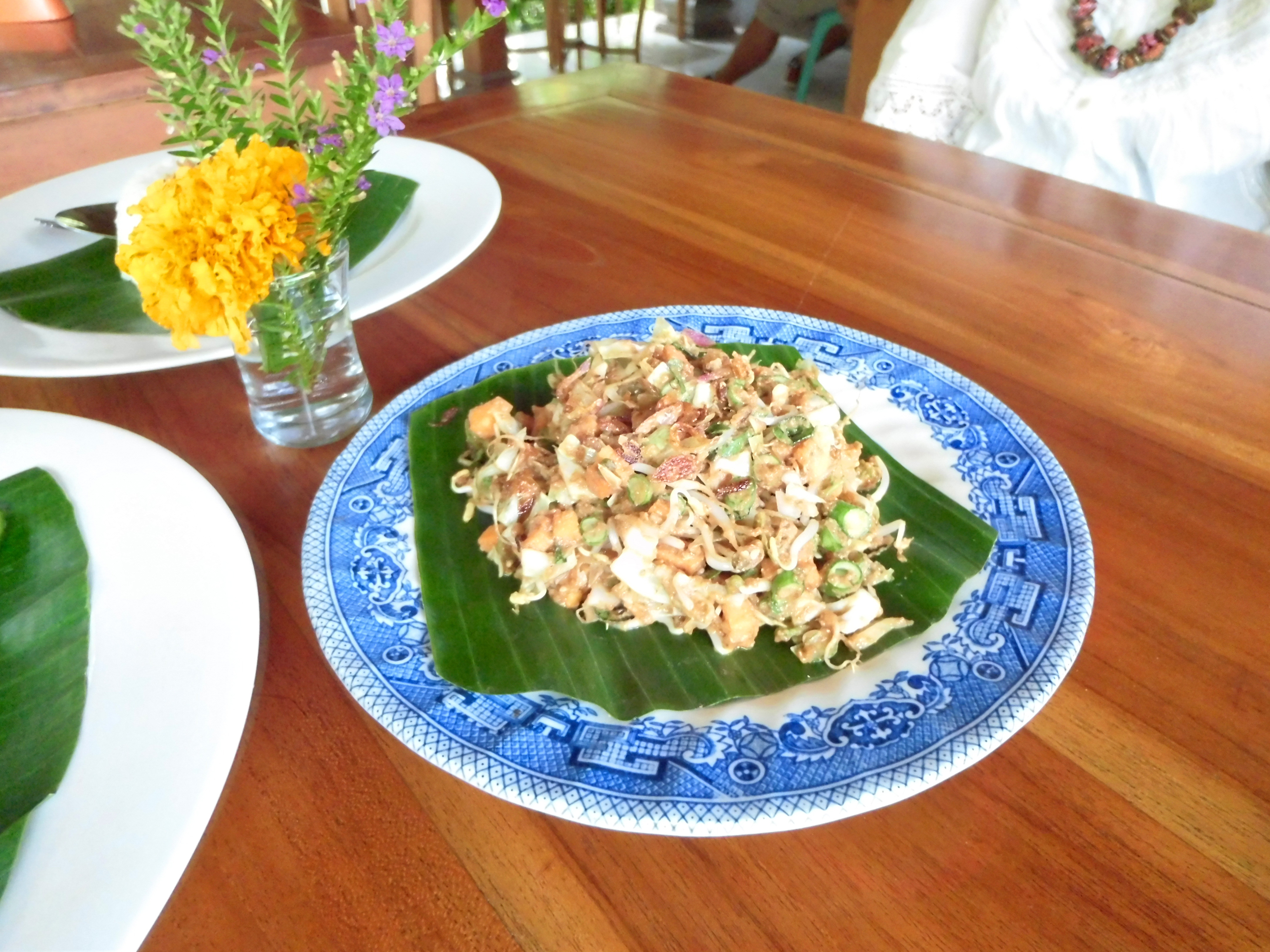
Karedok (raw vegetable salad)

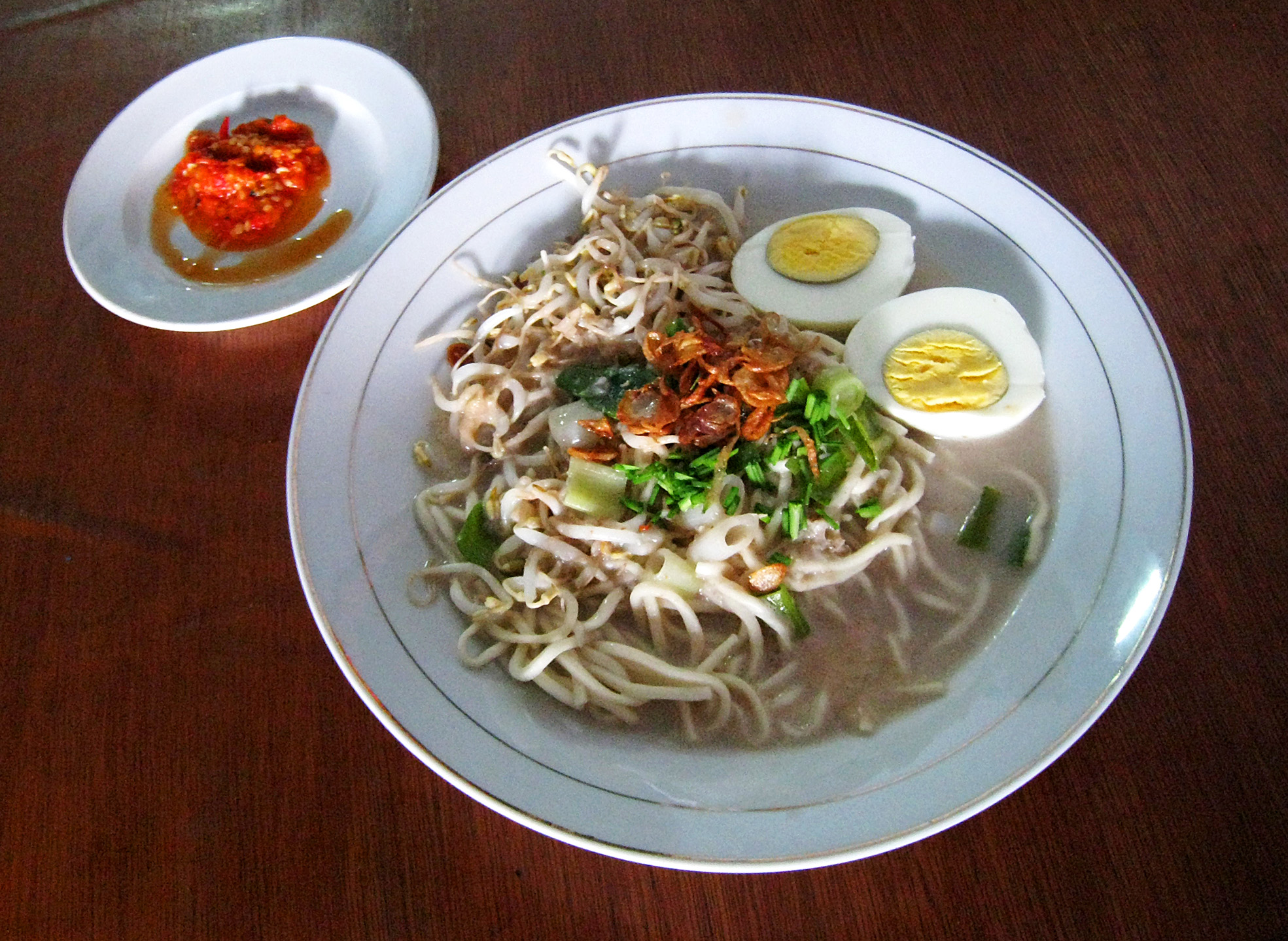
Mie celor (a soupy noodle dish from Palembang)

=== Vietnam ===
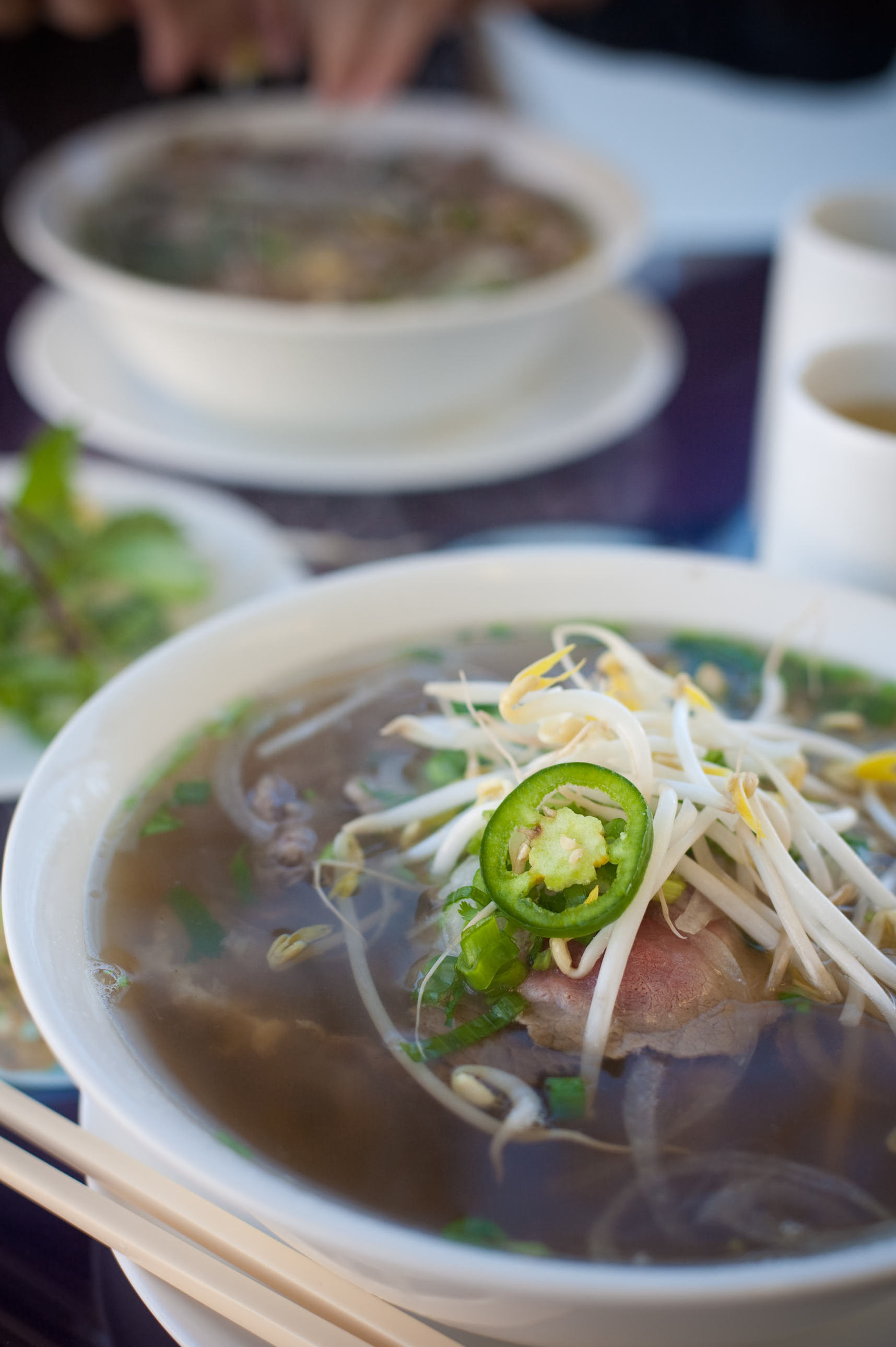
Phở with mung bean sprout topping

=== Philippines ===
In Filipino cuisine mung bean sprouts are usually eaten in stir-fried dishes.

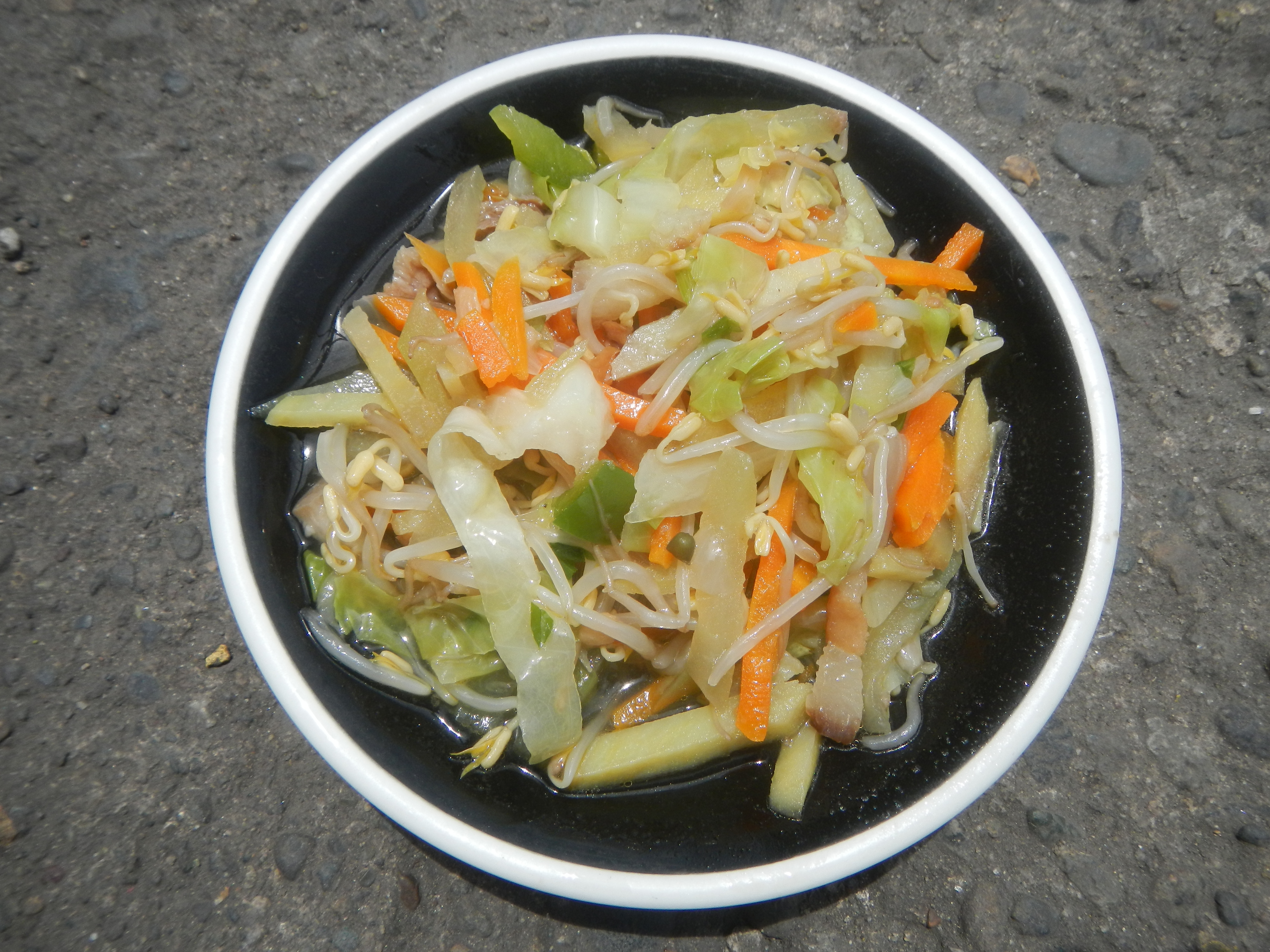
Ginisang togue

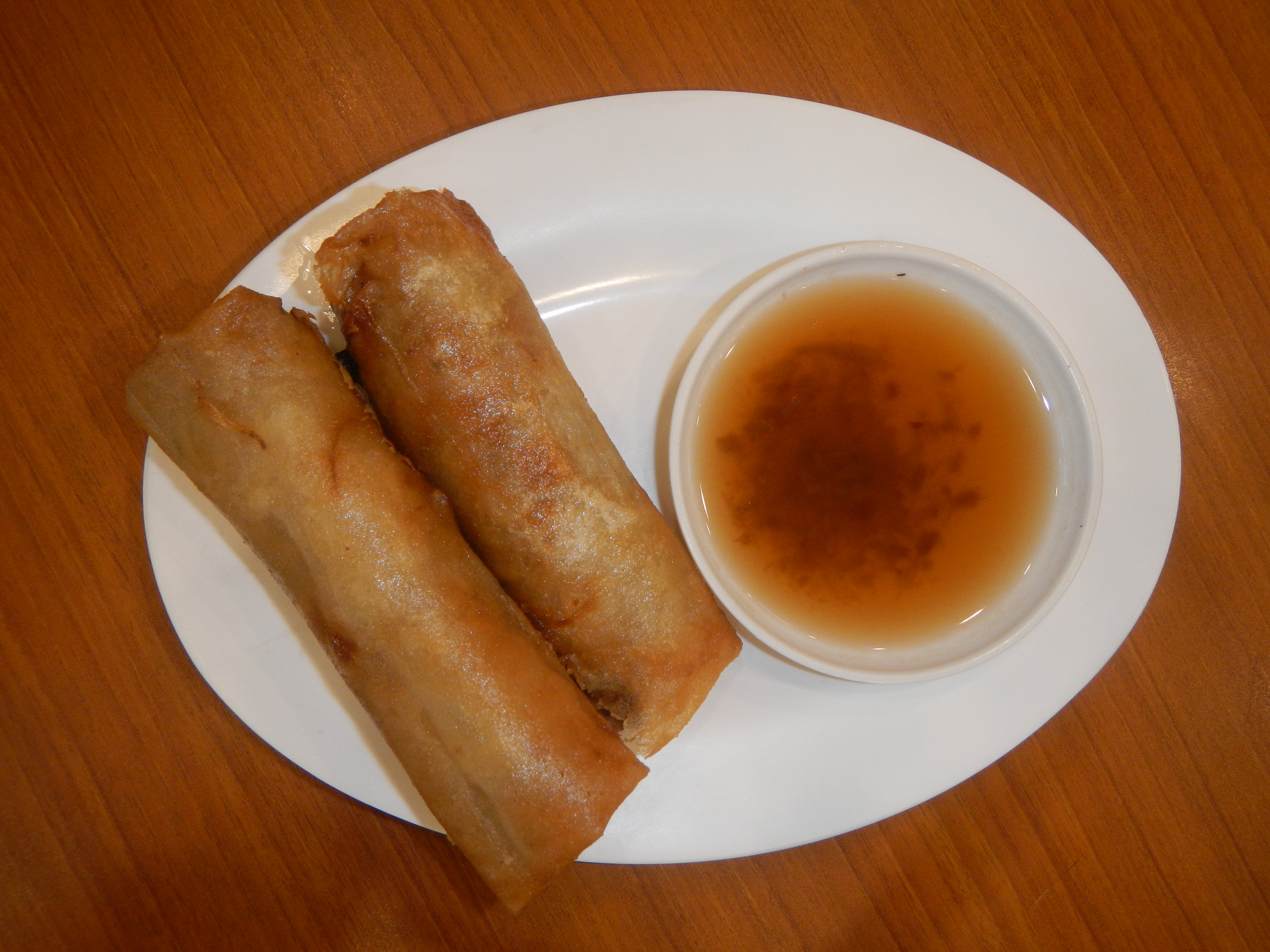
Mang Inasal's 'lumpiang togue'

'Ginisang Togue' (sautéed mung bean sprouts) is a mixture of stir-fried mung bean sprouts, tofu, shrimp, black fungus mushrooms, snow peas, carrots, soy sauce and oyster sauce.

'Lumpiang Togue' has a crispy and crunchy texture, being a snack variation of the spring roll. Mung bean sprout spring roll is made from choice ingredients like julienne carrots, minced onion and garlic, patís, green beans, dried shrimps, pork, fried tofu chopped, ground black pepper, spring roll wrapper and cooking oil. It is dipped in spicy vinegar with onions, siling labuyo and whole peppercorn.

== See also ==
- Bean sprout
- Soybean sprout
- Pea shoots
