= Lotek =

Lotek may refers to:

- Wayne "Lotek" Bennett
- Lotek (food)
