= Tipat cantok =

Balinese rice cake and vegetable salad in peanut sauce

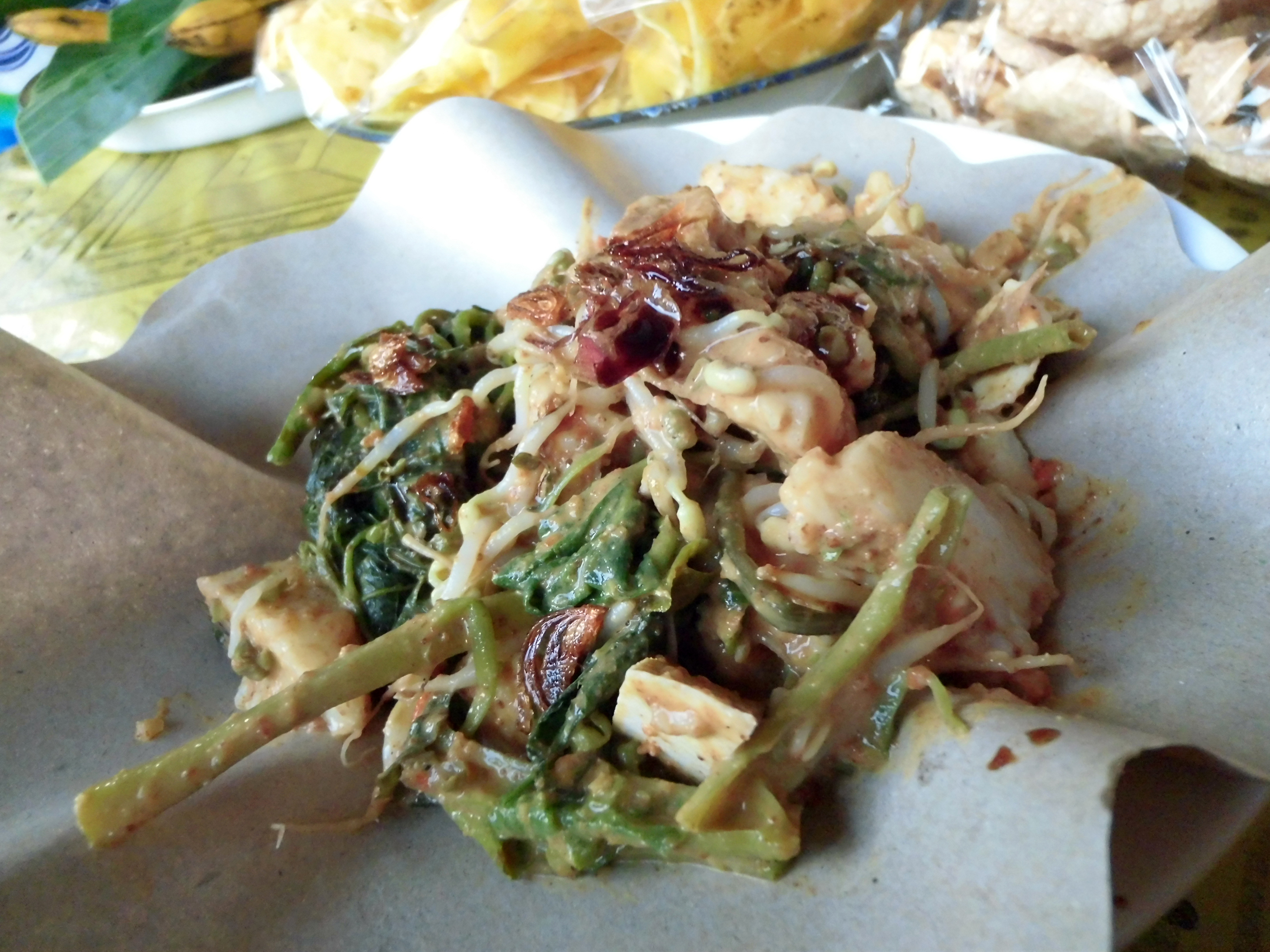
- Tipat cantok
- Course: Main course
- Place of origin: Indonesia
- Region or state: Bali
- Serving temperature: Room temperature
- Main ingredients: Ketupat rice cake with various vegetables served in peanut sauce

Tipat cantok (Aksara Bali: ᬢᬶᬧᬢ᭄ᬘᬦ᭄ᬢᭀᬓ᭄) is a Balinese popular local dish. It is made of various boiled or blanched vegetables with ketupat rice cake, served in spicy peanut sauce. In the Balinese language tipat means ketupat, while cantok means grounding ingredients using mortar and pestle. Vegetables normally used in this dish are asparagus bean, beansprout, water spinach, and tofu. It is a common street food, popular among tourists as well as locals.

Tipat or ketupat is a rice cake which often serves as a replacement for rice. The peanut sauce can be either mild, or hot and spicy with the addition of chili pepper. Usually bawang goreng (fried shallots) are sprinkled upon the dish, as well as kecap manis (sweet soy sauce). It is one of the few Balinese vegetarian dishes. Tipat cantok is akin to Javanese pecel and Jakartan gado-gado. In some dialects, it is also called tipat santok.

== See also ==
- Indonesian cuisine
- Gado-gado
- Pecel
