= Pecel =

Indonesian vegetable dish

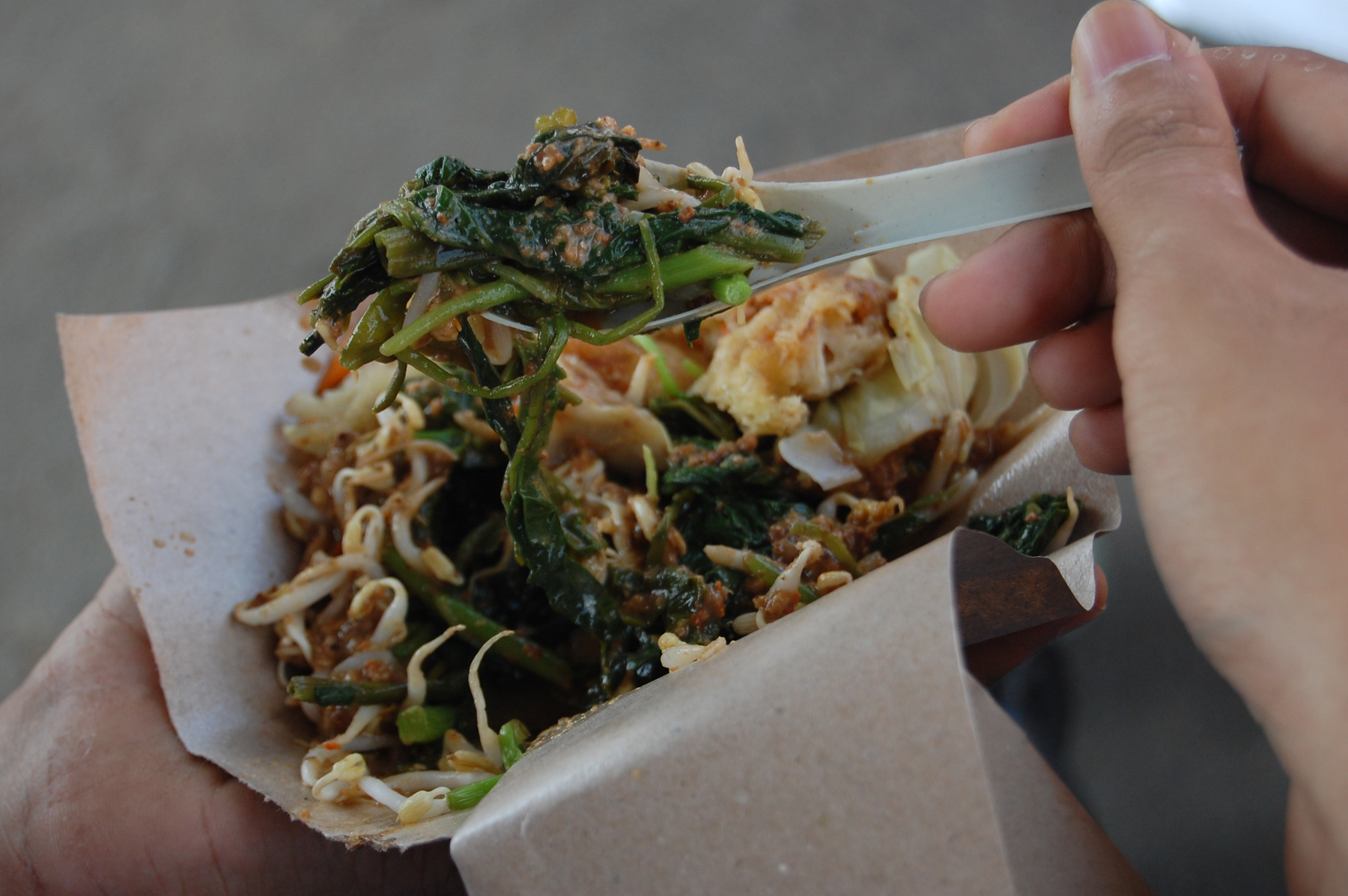
- Alternative names: Pecal
- Place of origin: Indonesia
- Region or state: Ponorogo, Madiun, Ngawi, Yogyakarta, Central Java, East Java
- Serving temperature: Room temperature
- Main ingredients: Vegetables in peanut sauce

Pecel (Indonesian pronunciation: [pət͡ʃəl], Javanese:ꦥꦼꦕꦼꦭ꧀) is a traditional Javanese salad with peanut sauce, usually eaten with steamed rice, lontong or ketupat.

The simplicity of its preparation and cheap price has contributed to its popularity throughout Java. It has become a food that represents practicality, simplicity, and travel since the dish is often found along train journeys across Java.

Pecel was introduced to Malaysia, where it is known as pecal, by Javanese immigrants. Pecel is also very popular in Suriname, where it was introduced by the Javanese Surinamese.

== History ==
Pecel is an ancient food that has existed since the 9th century AD, the era of the Ancient Mataram Kingdom under the reign of king Rakai Watukura Dyah Balitung (898–930 AD) which was recorded in the Kakawin Ramayana. Pecel is also written in the Taji Ponorogo Inscription (901 AD), the Siman Inscription from Kediri (865 S/943 AD), the Babad Tanah Jawi (1647 AD) and Serat Centhini (1742 S/1814 AD).

Pecel is only one of many Javanese vegetable-based salads. It is similar to lothek, except that lothek is usually served with fried batter or tofu and uses both raw and cooked vegetables.

== Ingredients ==
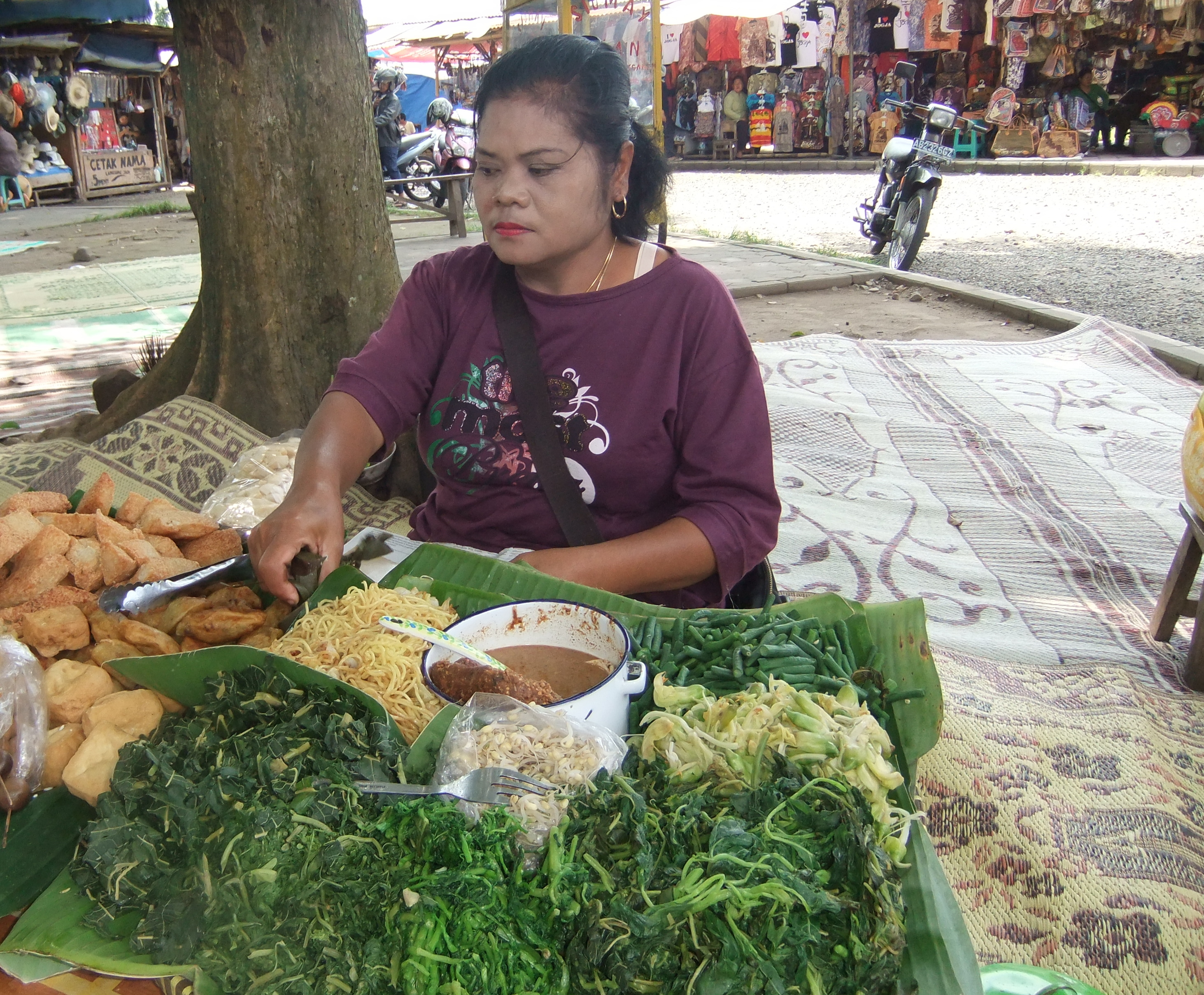
Displaying vegetables and other ingredients on banana leaf is a traditional way on selling pecel near Borobudur, Central Java.

The main ingredients usually consist of leafy vegetables, bean sprouts (or any other plant sprouts), long beans, and cabbages. Some other types of vegetables can also be added. People may use amaranth leaves, kangkung, cassava leaves, or leaves of any other local plants that are in season. Some modern recipes will add carrots (sliced) into the mix or replace white cabbages with red ones to spice up the color.

The sauce is made of roasted (or fried) peanuts, tamarind (asam jawa), coconut sugar, and other spices. It might be served thick or watery, sweet or spicy, depending on the regional variation.

Pecel is usually eaten with rice or rice cake (lontong or kupat). It can also be eaten alone or with fried side dishes, such as fried tempeh, tofu, etc.; and Javanese crackers, such as krupuk or rempeyek.

== Variants ==
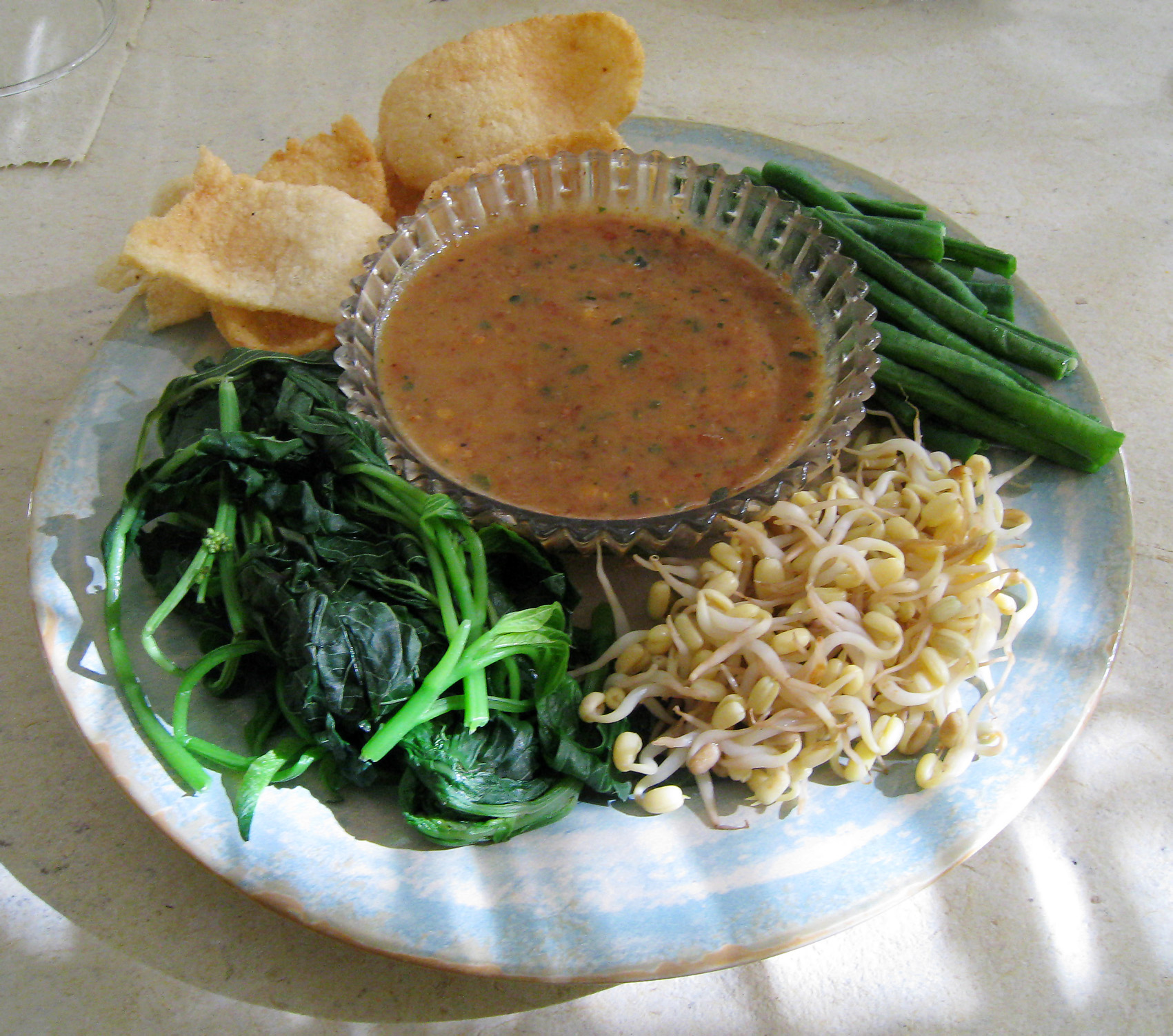
Solo pecel, served in a restaurant in Solo, Central Java

The difference usually lies in the thickness level of the sauce and the taste profiles (spicy, sweet, or savoury). In Central Java, pecel sauce is sweet-savoury with medium thickness, except in the northern coast and northeastern regions where the sauce tends to be spicier and the sauce is usually a bit thinner than usual. In East Java, especially Madiun, the peanut sauce is very thin and spicy. River tamarind (lamtoro) seeds are often added as a topping.

In Tegal, Central Java, pecel sauce is made of peanut and cassava root. In Surakarta's pecel ndeso, black sesame sauce is used on top of peanut sauce.

In Yogyakarta, pecel is served with bacem (sweet-simmered) tempeh or tofu. In Surakarta, a pecel variant called lothek (alt. spelling: lotek) includes the use of some raw vegetables, lontong, and gorengan. The name "lothek" is derived from "luthik", a wooden spatula used to scoop the peanut sauce from a cowek (grinding bowl).

Pecel tumpang is a pecel smothered with tumpang (tempeh sauce). It is a delicacy of Kertosono District in Nganjuk.

Mie pecel or pecel mie, noodles with pecel sauce common in Central Java as well as Medan. One of them is pecel mie kenyol from Batang, a noodle made from cassava with a chewy texture.

== Gallery ==
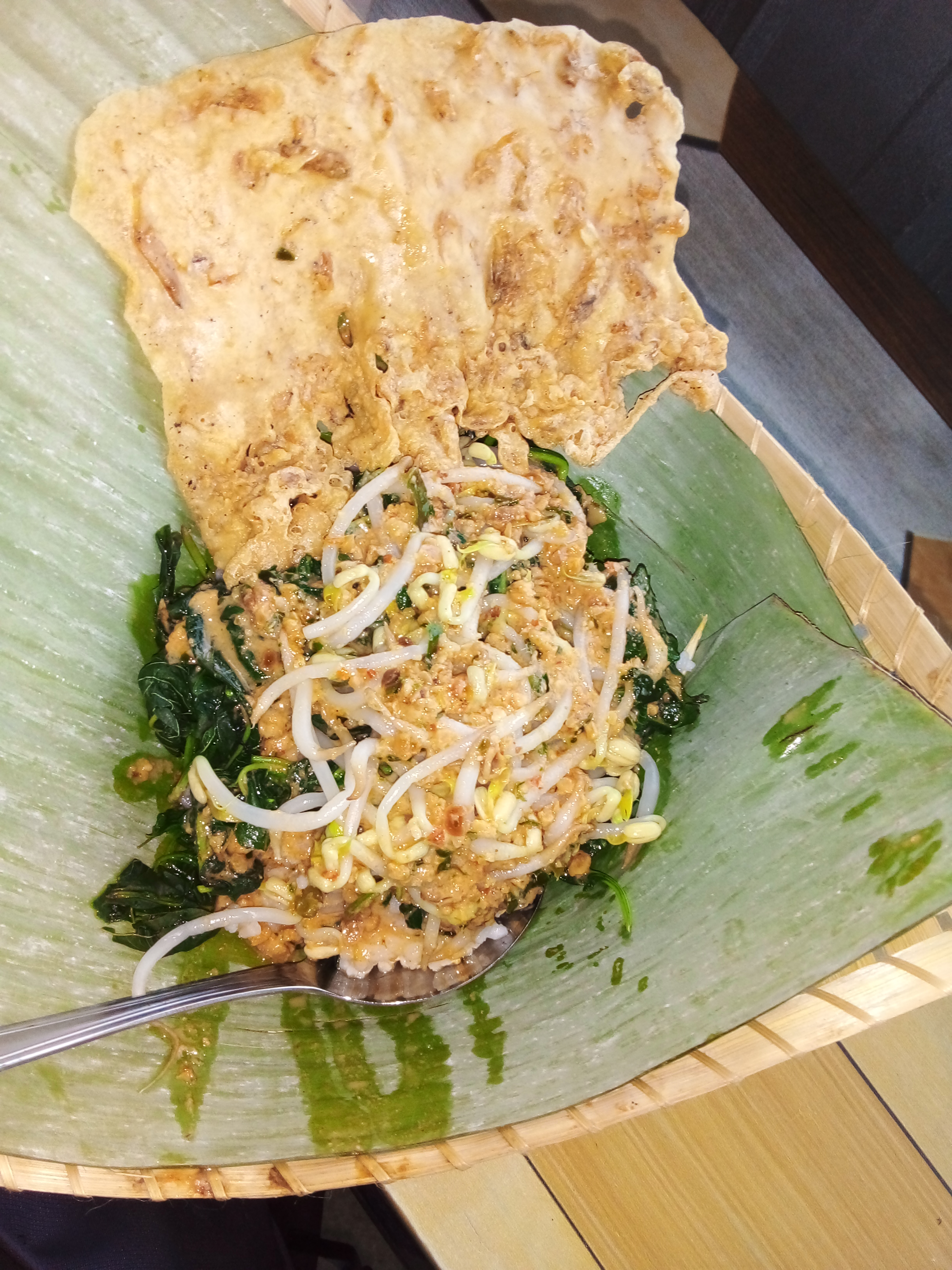
Pecel Madiun with rempeyek cracker

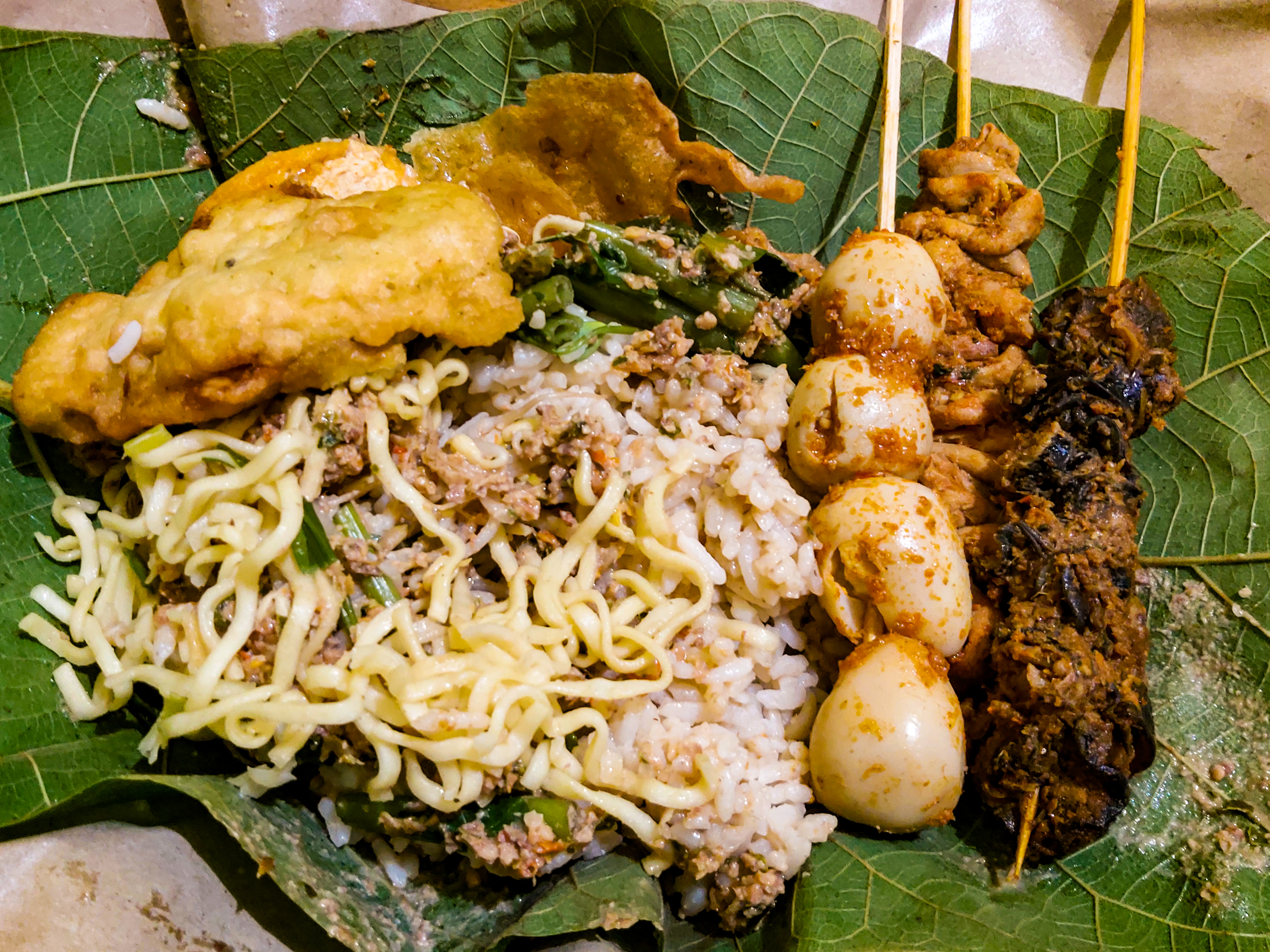
Pecel with fritter, sate puyuh (quail egg satay), sate keong (freshwater snail satay), and sate usus (chicken intestine satay) on a teak leaf in Tuban

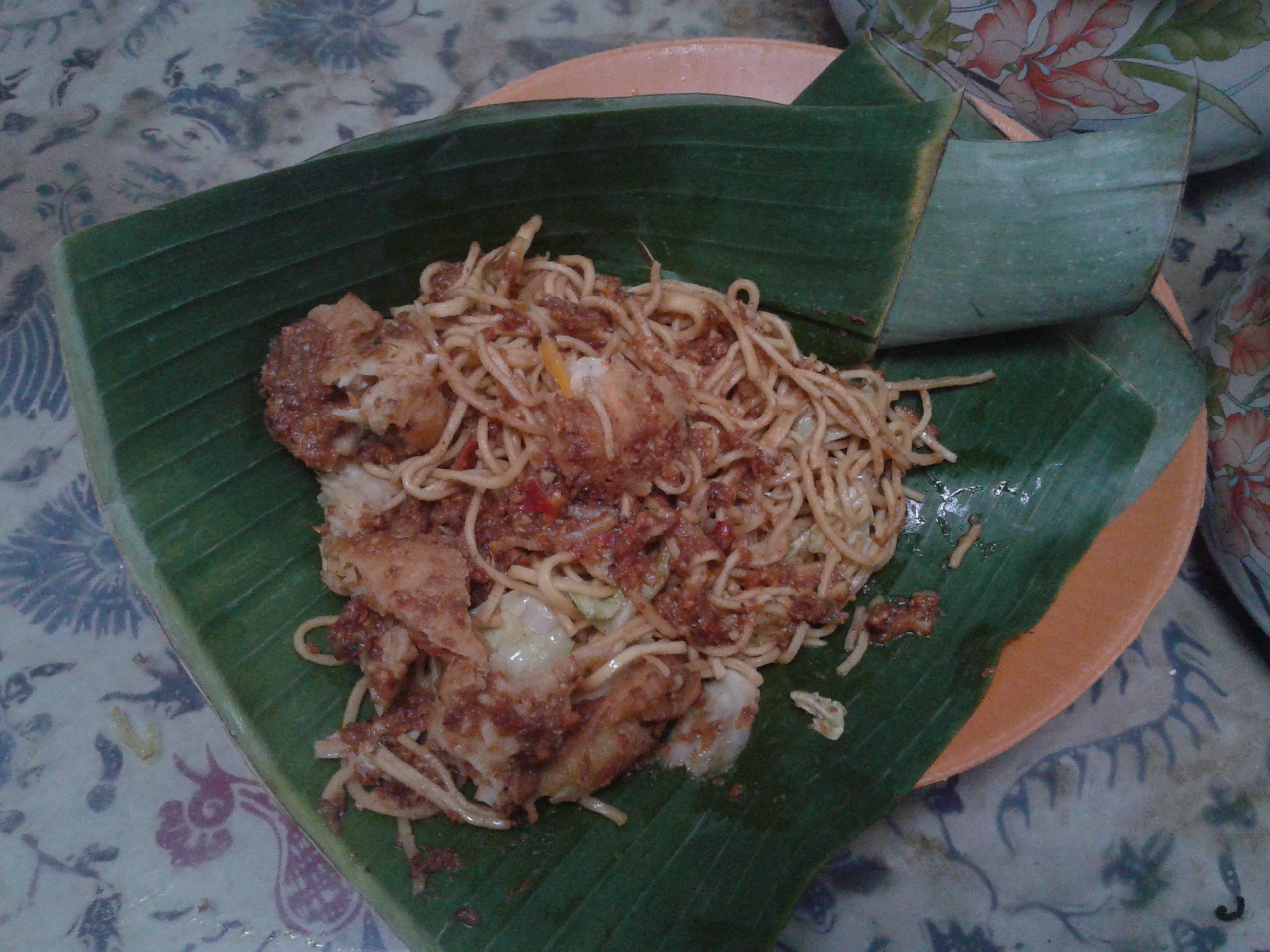
Mie pecel with badak (veggies fritter) in Semarang

== See also ==
- Karedok
- Tipat cantok
- Ketoprak
- Lawar
- List of salads
- Pecel lele
- Urap
