= Satay bee hoon =

Singaporean satay dish

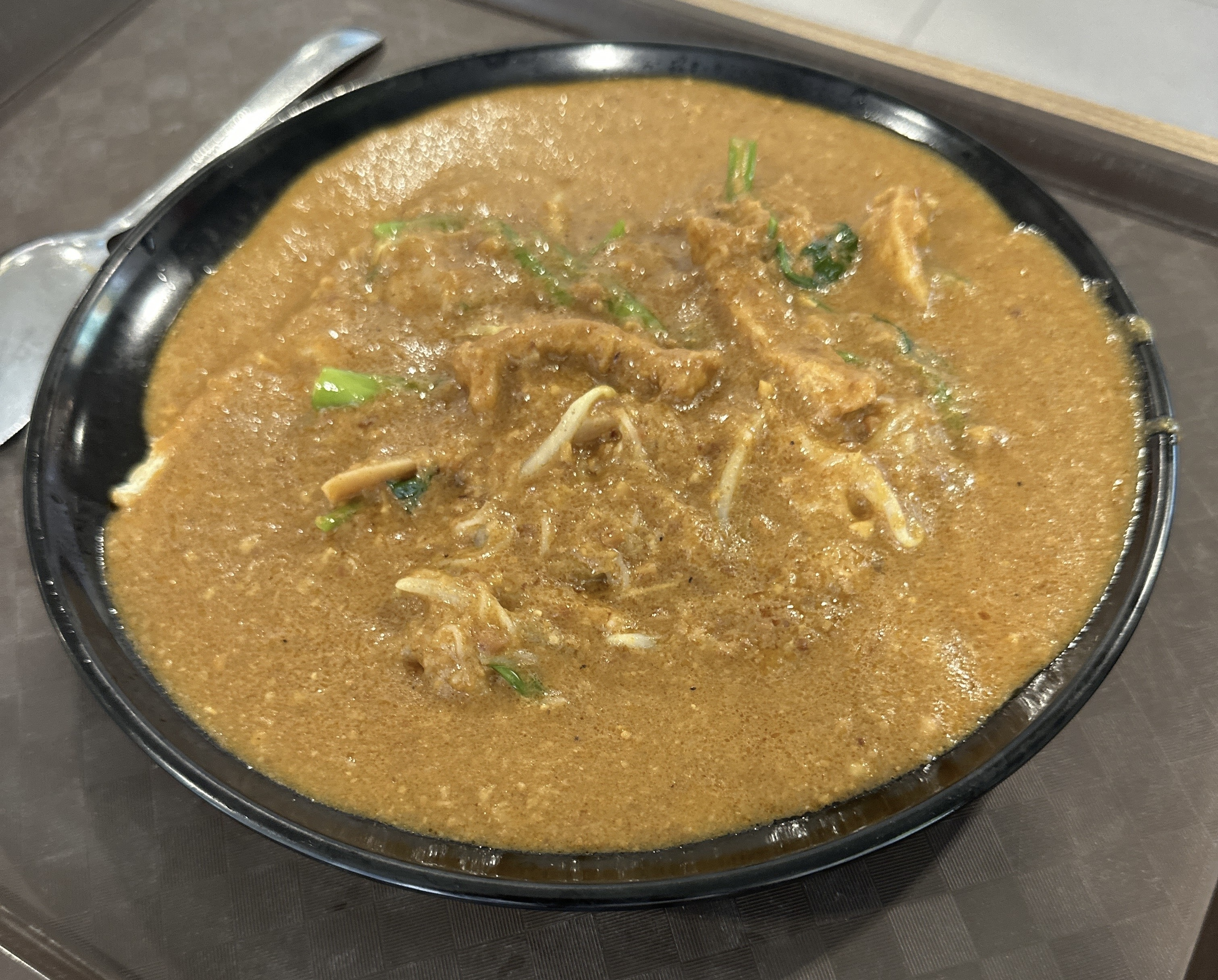
- A plate of uneaten satay bee hoon
- Course: Main course
- Place of origin: Singapore
- Region or state: Nationwide in Singapore
- Serving temperature: Hot
- Main ingredients: Rice vermicelli and peanut sauce typically accompanied by cuttlefish, fried bean curd pufs, cockles and vegetables known as kangkung or water spinach

Satay bee hoon is a Singaporean dish. It was created due to cultural fusion of the Malays or Javanese with the Teochew people who immigrated to Singapore. Satay bee hoon sauce is a chilli-based peanut sauce very similar to the one served with satay. The satay sauce is spread on top of rice vermicelli.

== Ingredient ==
The main ingredient of satay bee hoon is satay sauce. Cuttlefish, kang kong, bean sprouts, pork slices, prawns and cockles can be added to the vermicelli before spreading the sauce.

== See also ==
- Ketoprak, a similar dish from Jakarta, Indonesia, that contains rice vermicelli, rice cake, tofu and beansprouts in peanut sauce.
- Cuisine of Singapore
- Peanut sauce
- List of peanut dishes
- Rice noodles
