= Gado-gado =

Indonesian salad dish

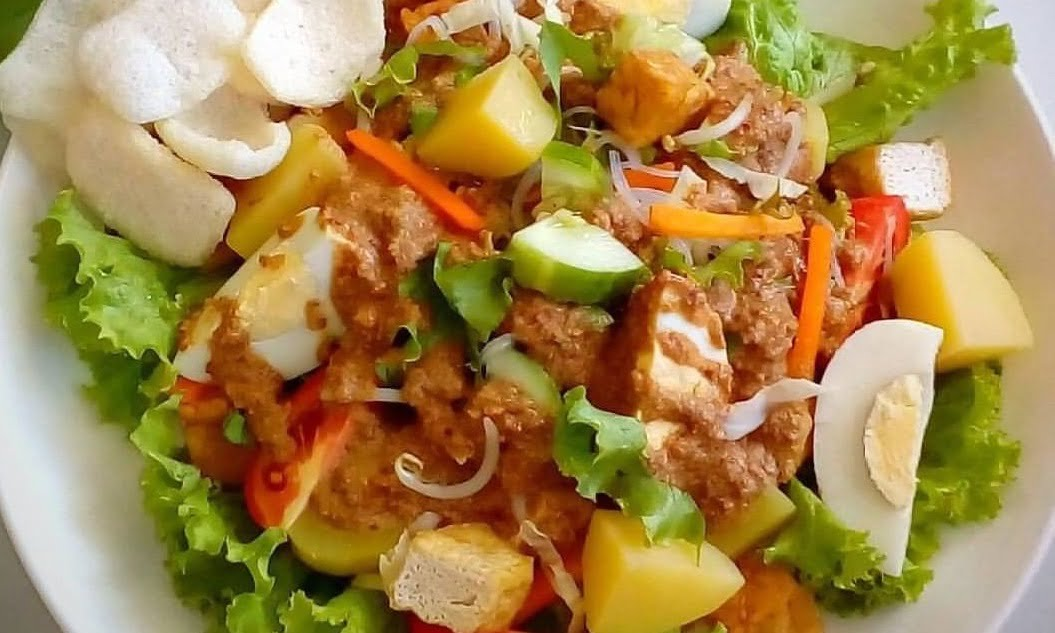
- Gado gado is vegetables mixed with peanut sauce
- Course: Main course
- Place of origin: Indonesia
- Region or state: Jakarta
- Associated cuisine: Indonesia
- Serving temperature: Room temperature
- Main ingredients: Various vegetables in peanut sauce topped with krupuk
- Variations: Karedok, a raw vegetable version of Gado-gado

Gado-gado (Indonesian or Betawi) is an Indonesian salad of raw, slightly boiled, blanched or steamed vegetables and hard-boiled eggs, boiled potato, fried tofu and tempeh, and sliced lontong (compressed cylinder rice cake wrapped in a banana leaf), served with a peanut sauce dressing.

In 2018, gado-gado was promoted as one of five national dishes of Indonesia; the others are soto, sate, nasi goreng, and rendang.

== Etymology ==
The term gado or the verb menggado means to consume something without rice. In Indonesian Betawi, digado or menggado means to eat a certain dish (be it fish, meat, chicken, etc.) without rice. Gado-gado is made up of a rich mixture of vegetables, including potatoes, longbeans, bean sprouts, spinach, chayote, bitter gourd, corn and cabbage, along with tofu, tempeh, and hard-boiled eggs. They are all mixed in peanut sauce dressing, sometimes also topped with krupuk and sprinkles of fried shallots. Gado-gado is different from Sundanese lotek atah or karedok as the latter uses only raw vegetables. Another similar dish is the Javanese pecel.

== Region ==
Gado-gado is widely sold in almost every part of Indonesia, each with its own regional variations. It is thought to have originally been a Sundanese dish, as it is most prevalent in Western parts of Java (which includes Jakarta, Banten, and West Java provinces). The Javanese have their own slightly similar version of a vegetables-in-peanut-sauce dish called pecel which is more prevalent in Central and East Java. Gado-gado is widely available at hawkers' carts, stalls (warung) and restaurants and hotels throughout Indonesia; it is also served in Indonesian-style restaurants worldwide. Although it is customarily called a salad, the peanut sauce is a larger component of gado-gado than is usual for the dressings in Western-style salads; the vegetables should be well-coated with it.

Some eating establishments use different mixtures of peanut sauce or add other ingredients for taste, such as cashew nuts. In Jakarta, several eating establishments boast gado-gado as their signature dish, some of which have been in business for decades and have developed faithful clientele. For example, Gado-Gado Boplo restaurant chain has been around since 1970, while Gado-Gado Bonbin in Cikini has been around since 1960.

The peanut sauce is made of ground fried peanuts, sweet palm sugar, garlic, chillies, salt, tamarind, and a squeeze of lime. Gado-gado is generally freshly made, sometimes in front of the customers to suit their preferred degree of spiciness, which corresponds to the amount of chili pepper included. However, particularly in the West, gado-gado sauce is often prepared ahead of time and in bulk. Gado-gado sauce is also available in dried form, which is simply rehydrated by adding hot water.

Gado-gado sauce is not to be confused with satay sauce, which is also a peanut sauce.

== History ==
The history of this Indonesian culinary dish does not have a fixed historical background. Rather, there are several different theories and beliefs as to how gado-gado became an Indonesian culinary dish. The different theories and beliefs are written below:

=== Indonesian word "digado" ===
Gado-gado comes from the Indonesian word "digado". However, the word "digado" does not exist in the Indonesian dictionary. The word "digado" originates from a specific Indonesian culture, Java. In the Betawi language, the word means “to not be eaten with rice”, which is why rice is not included as one of the key ingredients of gado-gado. Rather, a substitute of rice is used, which is known as lontong, otherwise known as Indonesian rice cake.

=== Tugu village ===
Another theory is that gado-gado originated from the Tugu village. In the early 1700s, when the Europeans arrived in Indonesia, a number of Portuguese people started a village currently known as the Tugu village. It is said that these Portuguese people brought their local cuisine to Indonesia. Through the introduction of the Portuguese culture, the dish gado-gado was first introduced to Indonesia.

=== Chinese origin ===
Some claim that gado-gado originated from the Chinese people living in Betawi. Some claim that the Chinese people really enjoyed the Javanese pecel, which is an Indonesian salad, and wanted to modify the dish to better accommodate their taste. As a result, the dish gado-gado was created.

== Variations ==
=== Gado-gado Betawi ===
This variation of gado-gado originates from Betawi in Jakarta and is known for being prepared differently as compared to the other variations. Based on a recipe book "Resep Gado-Gado Betawi" by Sasongko Iswandaru , the dish consists of boiled vegetables, including long bean, bean sprout and cabbage, mixed with fried tofu, tempeh and boiled egg, served with peanut sauce.

=== Gado-gado Padang ===
Unlike gado-gado sederhana, gado-gado Padang adds yellow noodles and sohun, which are cellophane noodles, to the gado-gado dish. This variation of gado-gado originated from Padang in West Sumatra. It is also known to have a spicy flavor. This variation follows other common dishes in Padang, which are known for having a spicy flavor.

=== Gado-gado Sederhana ===
A translation of “gado-gado sederhana” is “simple gado-gado”. This variation is the basic way of preparing a gado-gado dish, which is made using vegetables, bean sprouts, lontong and peanut sauce as key ingredients.

=== Gado-gado Sidoarjo ===
This variation of gado-gado originated from Sidoarjo and is created using an addition of petis, which is a food additive added to the peanut sauce.

=== Gado-gado Surabaya ===
This variation of gado-gado cooks the peanut sauce and spreads it over the dish. Some claim that cooking the peanut sauce makes the dish last longer. It uses lettuce and tomatoes as some of the ingredients of the dish. It also uses coconut milk in the peanut sauce, for flavor and to make the sauce look oilier.

== Ingredients ==
=== Peanut dressing ===
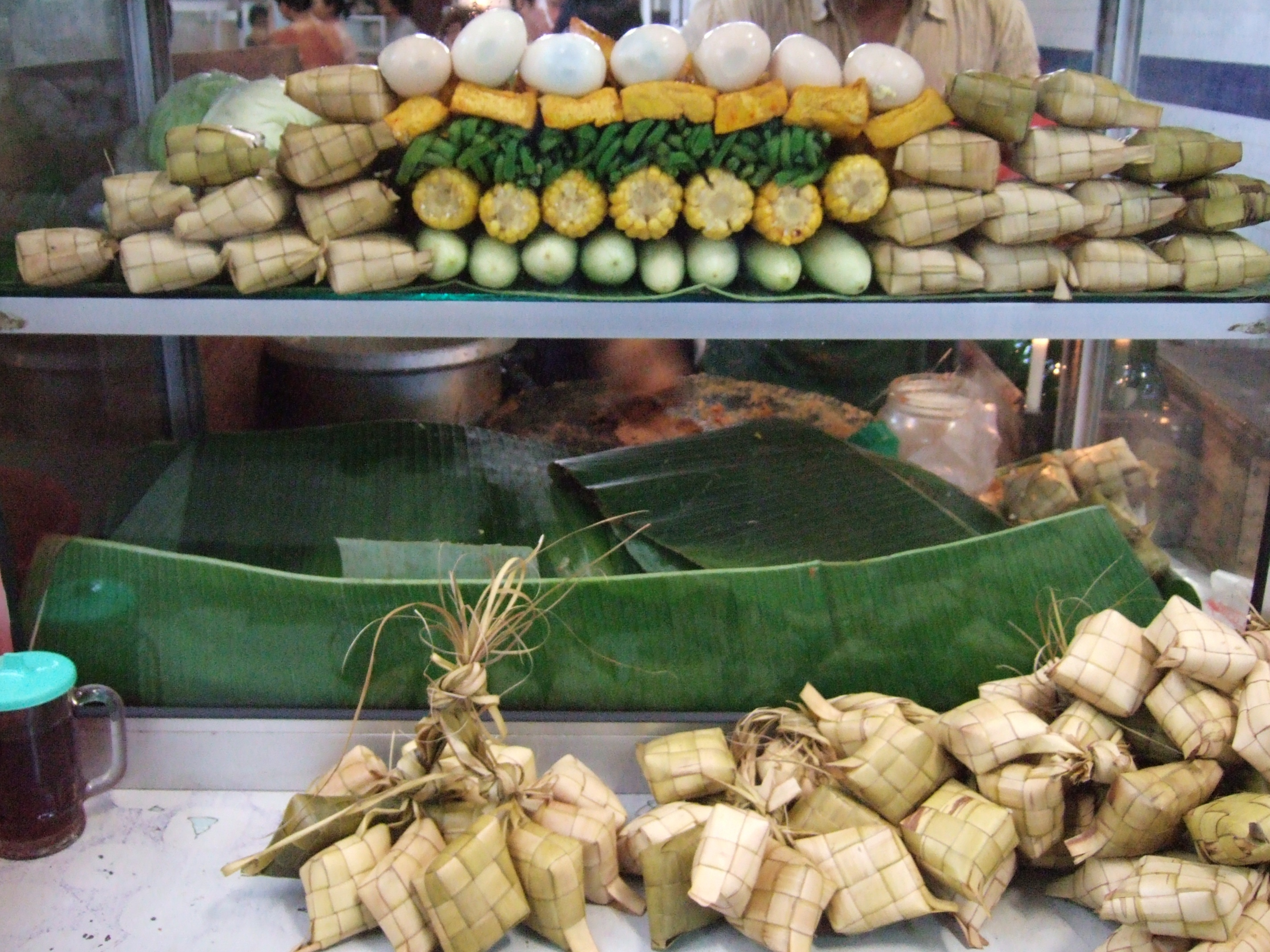
Gado-gado stall displaying ingredients of the dish.

Most of the flavours in gado-gado are acquired from the mixture of its bumbu kacang or peanut salad dressing. Gado-gado combines slightly sweet, spicy and savory tastes. The common primary ingredients of the peanut sauce are as follows:

- ground fried peanuts (kidney beans may be substituted for a richer taste)
- coconut sugar/palm sugar (substitute brown sugar if unavailable)
- chillies (according to preference and desired degree of spiciness)
- terasi (dried shrimp paste)
- salt
- tamarind juice
- lime juice
- water to dilute

The traditional method of making gado-gado is to use the cobek (pestle) and ulekan or flat, rounded stone. The dry ingredients are ground first, then the tamarind liquids are added to achieve the desired consistency.

=== Vegetables ===
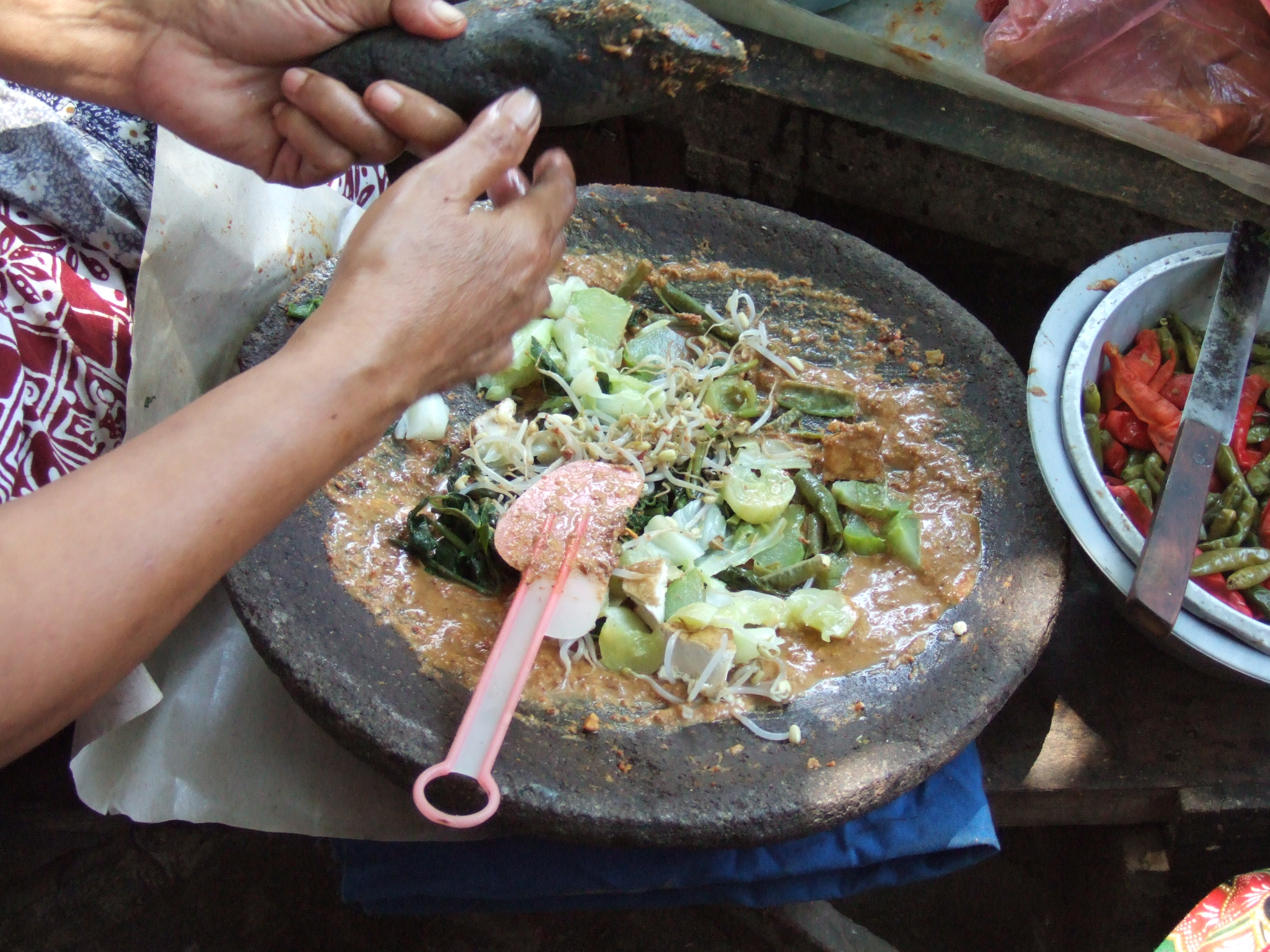
A traditional Indonesian way of making gado-gado.

The composition of the vegetable salad varies greatly, but usually comprises a mixture of some of the following:

- blanched - shredded, chopped, or sliced green vegetables such as cabbage, kangkung, spinach, bean sprouts, boiled young jackfruit, chayote, string bean, green bean, bitter melon, and corn.
- sliced - boiled potatoes
- uncooked - sliced cucumber, tomato, and lettuce.
- peeled and sliced boiled eggs
- sliced - fried tofu and tempeh

Outside Indonesia, it is usual to improvise with whatever vegetables are available. All the ingredients are blanched or lightly boiled, including vegetables, potatoes and bean sprouts, except for the tempeh and tofu, which are fried, and the cucumber, which is sliced and served fresh. The blanched vegetables and other ingredients are mixed well with the dressing.

=== Garnishes and rice ===
In Indonesia gado-gado is commonly served mixed with chopped lontong or ketupat (glutinous rice cake), or with steamed rice served separately. It is nearly always served with krupuk, tapioca crackers, or emping, Indonesian-style fried crackers made from melinjo. A common garnish is bawang goreng, a sprinkle of finely-chopped fried shallot.

== Serving ==
There are three common ways of serving the gado-gado dish in Indonesia. Firstly, gado-gado is sometimes prepared at home as a traditional Indonesian dish. It is relatively easy to prepare and cook, which is part of the reason why gado-gado can be commonly found in Indonesian households. Secondly, some street vendors and warungs in Indonesia are known to sell gado-gado. However, different cities may serve different variations of gado-gado depending on the region. Thirdly, gado-gado can also be found in restaurants that serve Indonesian cuisine. Amongst many Indonesian restaurants, gado-gado is a relatively common dish, because it is popular in Indonesia.

== See also ==
- Ketoprak Jakarta
- Lawar
- Urap
- Kuluban
