= Lotek (food) =

Indonesian traditional food

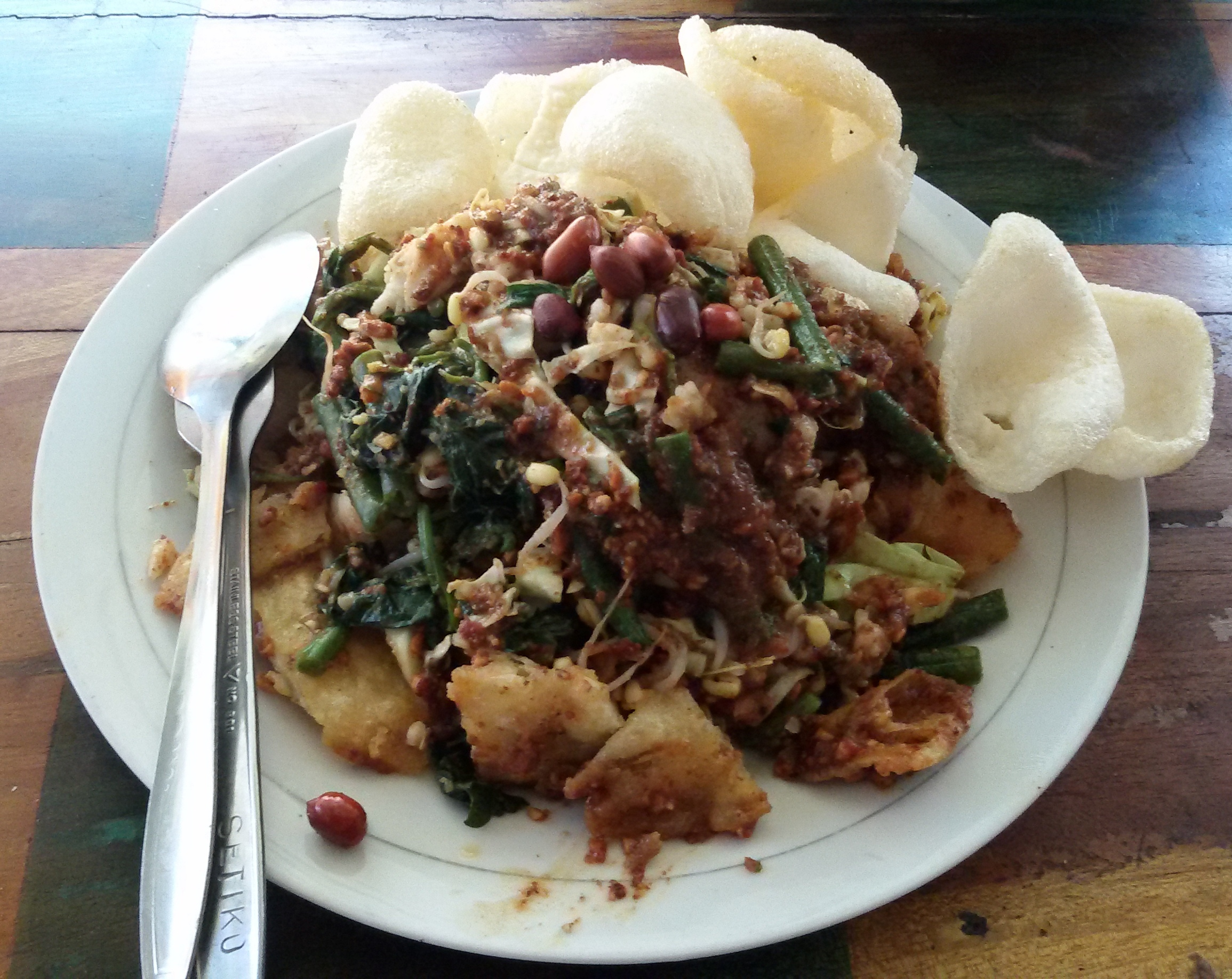
Lotek

Lotek (alt. spelling: lothek, Javanese: ꦭꦺꦴꦛꦼꦏ꧀) is a Javanese (Indonesian) vegetable-based salad with peanut sauce. While the sauce ingredients are the same with that of pecel, lotek sauce is typically much sweeter to taste, a nod to a classic "Matraman" (adj. belong to the Mataram Sultanate) cuisine.

Lotek is popular in the southern parts of Central Java and Yogyakarta, where a sweet taste is traditionally preferred. It may also be called lontong pecel since it is basically lontong and pecel served with krupuk and gorengan.

== Etymology ==
The word lothek is derived from a Javanese word which means "a wooden or bamboo spatula", used to scoop out sambal, sauce, or any paste, from the grinding bowl. In modern Indonesia, the "th-" sound is replaced with "t-", which non-Javanese speakers find easier to pronounce. As Javanese traditional villages turn urban (and welcome people from other ethnic groups), the "t-" sound version is used more often.

== Variants ==
In Yogyakarta, lotek includes the use of mixed vegetables (raw and steamed vegetables), served with krupuk, tempeh, bakwan (fried batter), and fried tofu. In Surakarta, people use steamed or boiled vegetables with egg noodles.

Lotek is also popular in other regions in Indonesia, thanks to Javanese (urban) migrants. In Bandung, lotek is known as "a cross between gado-gado and pecel" since locals are more familiar with these references. The final dish looks similar to that of Surakarta's version. Some people may confuse lotek with karedok, but as in most vegetable dishes in Sundanese cuisine, the latter is made of raw vegetables.
