= Karedok =

Indonesian salad dish from West Java

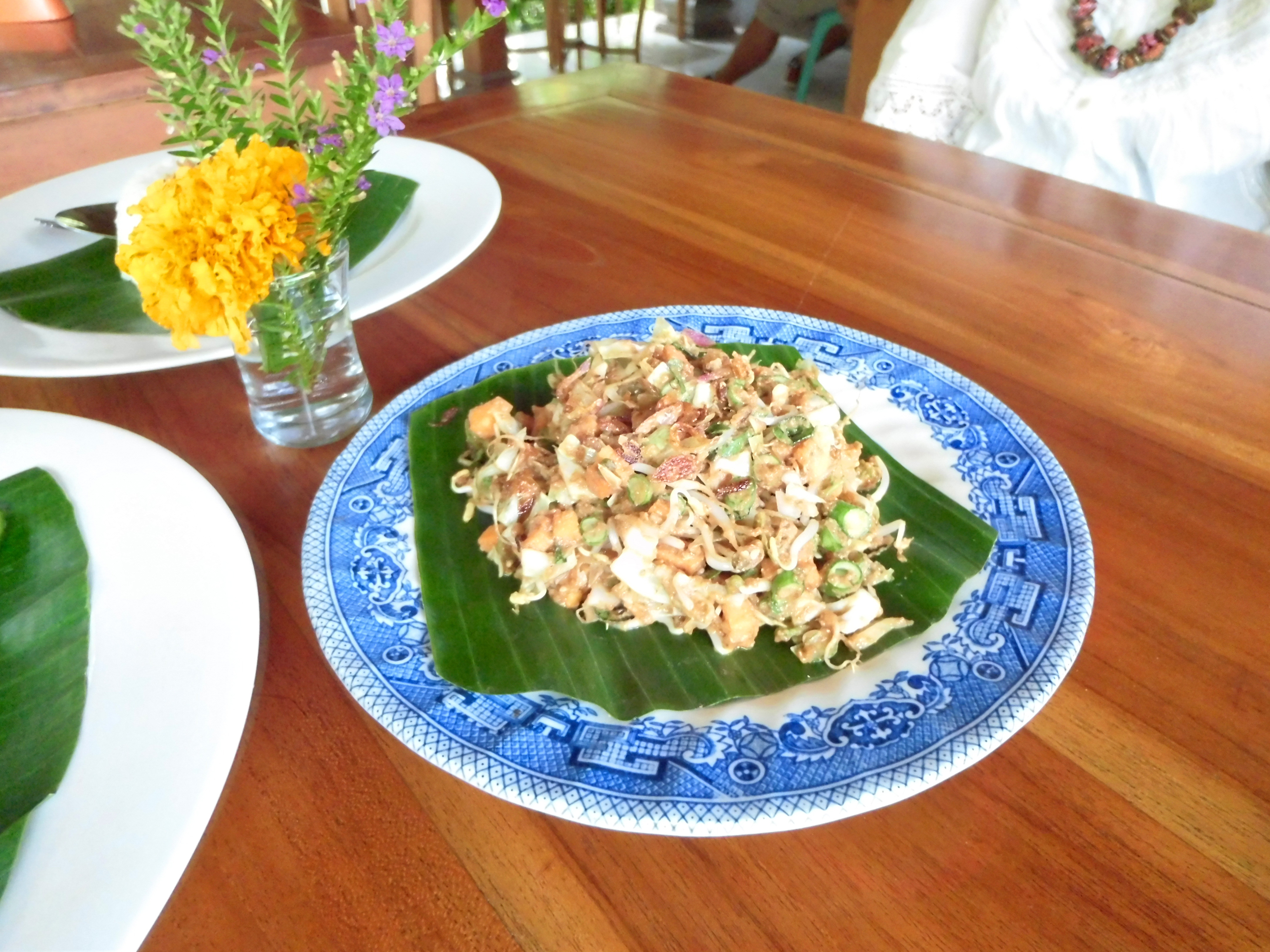
- Karedok served in a restaurant
- Type: Salad
- Course: Main course
- Place of origin: Indonesia
- Region or state: West Java
- Serving temperature: Room temperature
- Main ingredients: Raw vegetables, peanut sauce, krupuk
- Variations: Gado-gado

Karedok (Aksara Sunda: ᮊᮛᮦᮓᮧᮊ᮪) is a raw vegetable salad in peanut sauce from Sundanese region, West Java, Indonesia. It is one of the Sundanese signature dish. It traditionally includes longbeans, cucumbers, bean sprouts, cabbage, legumes, lemon basil, chayotes and small green eggplant, covered in peanut sauce dressing, but there are now many variations. It is very similar to gado-gado, except all the vegetables are raw, while most of gado-gado vegetables are boiled, and it uses kencur, lemon basil and eggplant. Karedok is also known as lotek atah (raw lotek or raw gado-gado) for its fresh and raw version of the vegetable covered with peanut sauce. Karedok is widely served as daily food in the Sundanese family, usually eaten with hot rice, tofu, tempeh, and krupuk. Nowadays karedok can be found in many variation from hawkers carts, stalls (warung) as well as in restaurants and hotels both in Indonesia and worldwide.

Karedok is part of a wide range of Indonesian dressing and salad combinations, along with lotek, pecel and gado-gado. In many places, to retain authenticity in both the production and flavor, the peanut sauce is made in individual batches, in front of the customers. However, since the dish has gained popularity (because of the increase of Asian-themed restaurants) Karedok sauce is now mostly made ahead of time and cooked in bulk, although this is probably more common in Western restaurants rather than in Indonesia. Nowadays in supermarket and stores, many peanut seasoning for karedok are made and sold. A dressing for this salad may include: Red pepper, sand ginger, bird's eye chili, greater galangal, fried peanuts, brackish water, palm sugar, salt, terasi (a condiment made from pounded and fermented shrimp), hot water, and white pepper.

== Variations ==
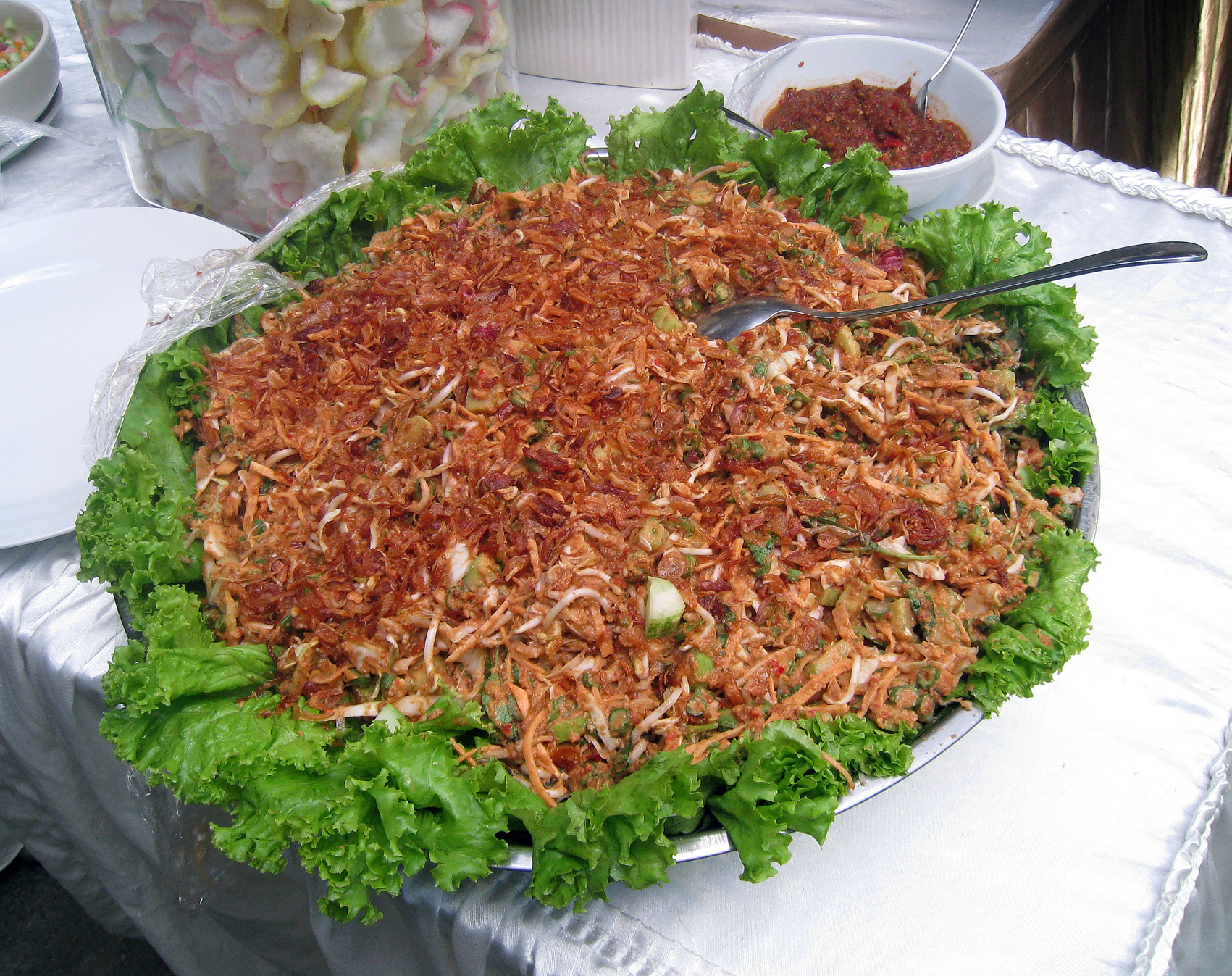
Karedok platter served in an Indonesian prasmanan buffet

Over time, there has been a lot of variation in the garnishes used in karedok and its taste, but it is still basically vegetables covered in peanut seasoning.

=== Peanut sauce dressing ===
What distinguishes karedok from a plain vegetable salad is the peanut sauce dressing, which is poured on top of the vegetable salad before serving. The composition of this peanut sauce varies from commonly used peanuts kacang tanah (Indonesian).

Karedok is always served with crackers, usually krupuk commonly made from tapioca crackers or with emping crackers which are made from melinjo. In Indonesia, karedok is also usually served with rice or lontong (rice wrapped in banana leaf) and sometimes with salted duck egg.

== See also ==
- Gado-gado
- Ketoprak Jakarta
