= List of post-classical dishes =

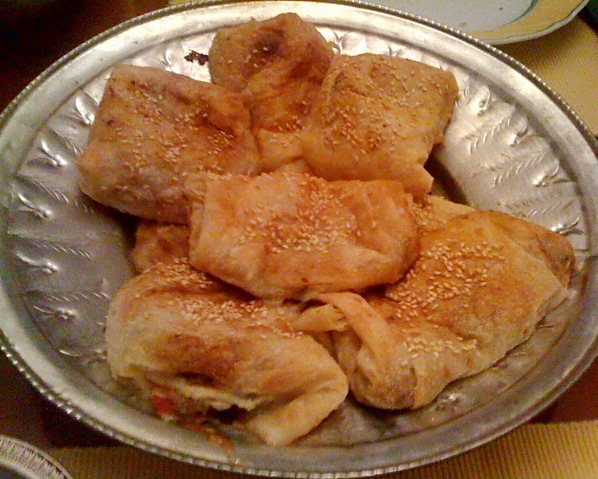
Börek

This is a list of dishes, prepared foods and beverages that have originated in the post-classical era, which spanned between 200–600 CE and 1200–1500 CE, depending on the continent.

== Asia ==
- Kinilaw - raw fish marinated in citrus juices, vinegar, spices, coconut milk, and tabon-tabon fruit extracts from the Philippines. The Balangay archaeological excavation site in Butuan (dated c. 10th to 13th century AD) has uncovered remains of halved tabon-tabon fruits and fish bones cut in a manner suggesting that they were cubed, thus indicating that the cooking process is at least a thousand years old.
- Krupuk – a traditional cracker made from rice flour, called kurupuk in ancient Javanese Taji inscription (901 CE).
- Kuluban – an ancient Javanese dish of boiled vegetables served in spices, similar to modern-day urap. Mentioned in the Rukam inscription, dated to 829 Saka (907 CE) and originating from the Mataram kingdom.
- Lalab – a similar vegetable dish called rumwah-rumwah was mentioned in the Panggumulan (Kembang Arum) inscription, dated to 824 Saka (902 CE) and originating from the Mataram kingdom.
- Philippine adobo – a dish and cooking process originating during the pre-colonial Philippines.
- Rawon – a meat stew, called rarawwan in an ancient Javanese Taji inscription (901 CE).
- Rujak – a spicy fruit dish, called rurujak in an ancient Javanese Taji inscription (901 CE).
- Tapuy – rice wine originating from the pre-colonial Philippines.
- Tempeh – high-protein fermented soy product from Indonesia. First known as kadêlê, and mentioned in an old Javanese manuscript Serat Sri Tanjung dating to the 12th to 13th century.
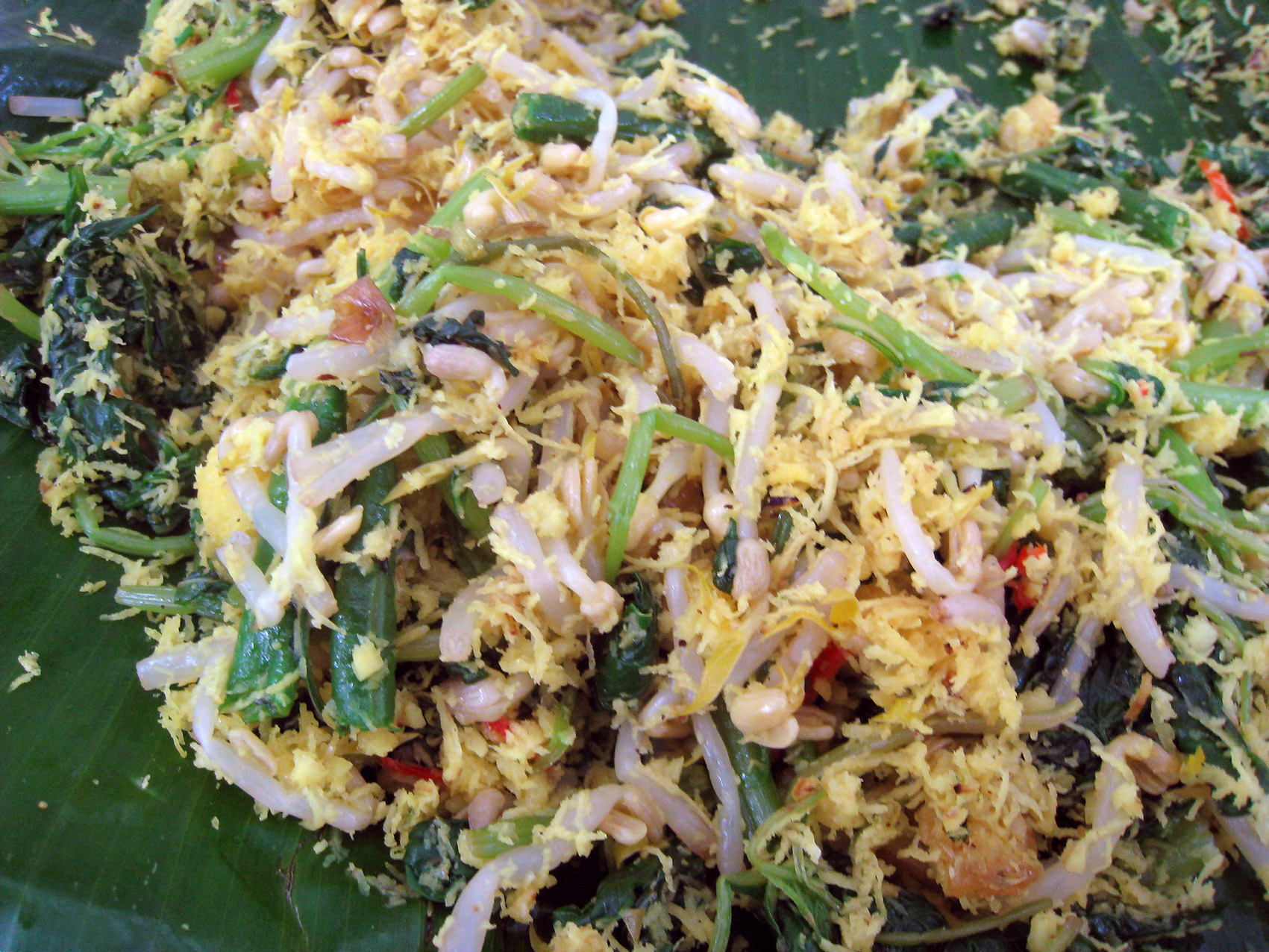
Kuluban or urap

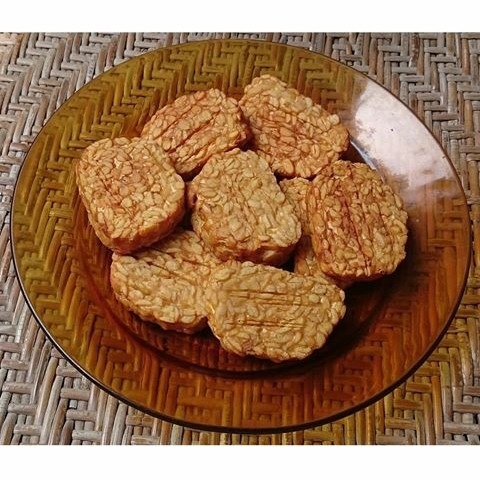
Fried tempeh

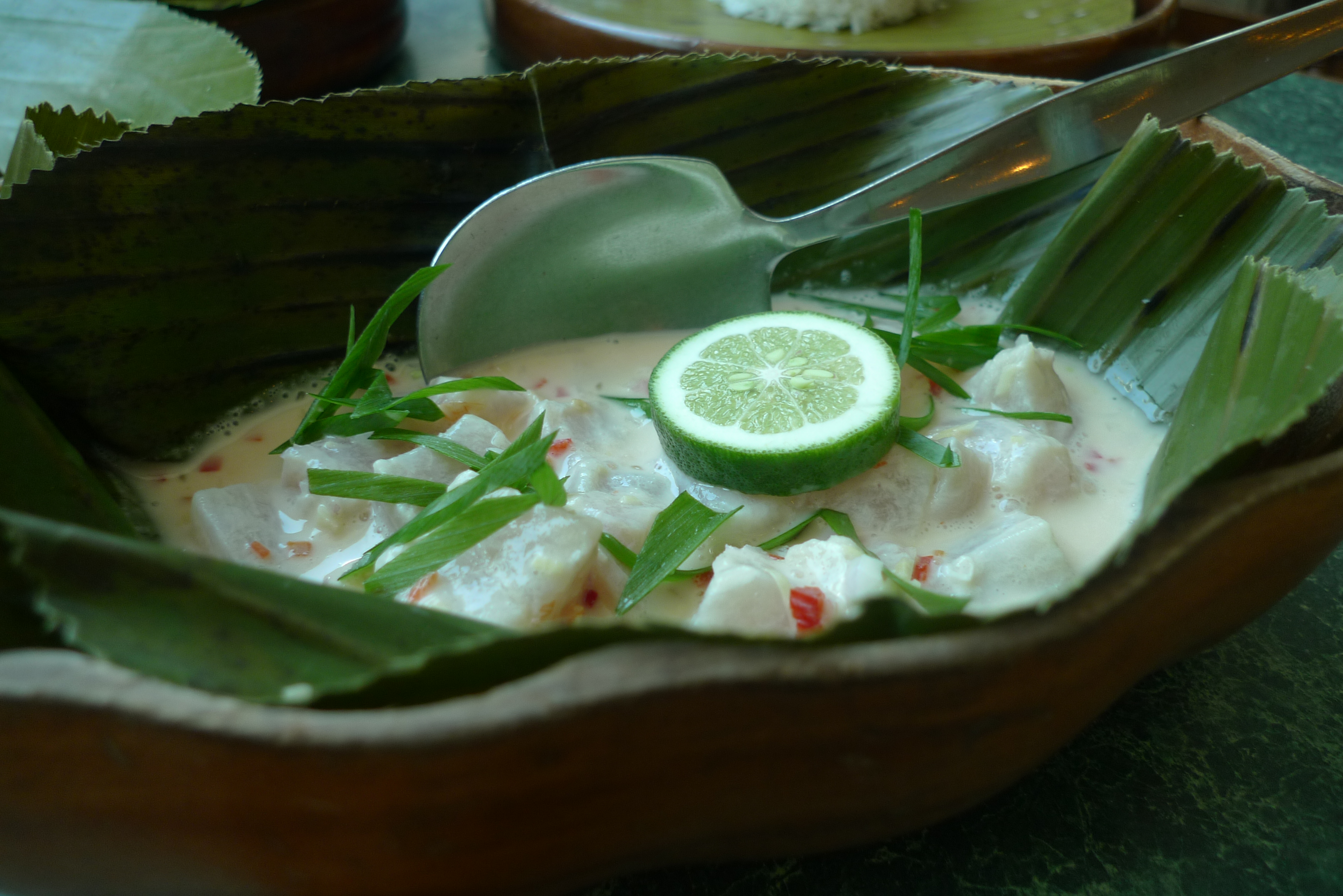
Kinilaw

== Europe ==
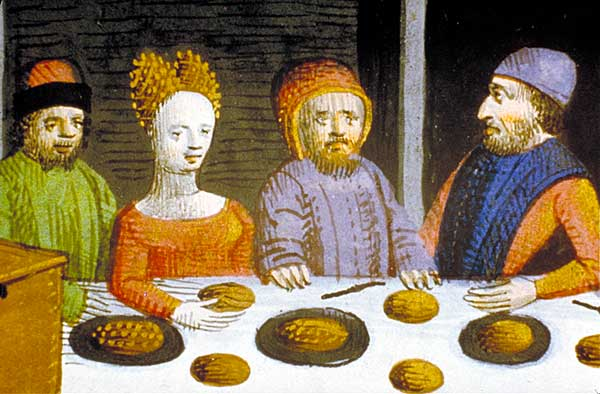
Frumenty, eaten in the 15th century as an entremet

=== Foods ===
- Blancmange – Dessert of milk or cream and sugar, thickened and flavoured
- Cameline sauce – Medieval cinnamon sauce
- Chawdron – Historical British sauce
- Chewette – Early English pie
- Dillegrout – Medieval capon potage
- Farsu magru – Sicilian meat dish
- Fazuelos – Sephardic Jewish pastries of thin fried dough
- Frumenty – Porridge of boiled grain in medieval Europe
- Galantine – several sauces made from powdered galangal root
- Gorgonzola – Italian blue cheese
- Horsebread – Type of medieval bread
- Leach – Medieval confection
- Manus Christi – Medieval sweetmeat
- Mince pie – Sweet pie with dried fruits and spices
- Mortis – Sweet chicken pâté of Elizabethan times
- Poume d'oranges – Medieval pork dish
- Pretzel – Baked pastry shaped into a knot
- Pynyonade – English confection made with pine nuts
- Sponge cake – Type of cake

=== Drinks ===
- Bochet – Type of mead
- Caudle – Historical hot drink
- Jenever – French, Dutch and Belgian juniper-flavoured liquor
- Kvass – Fermented low-alcoholic beverage
- Rumney wine – Greek wine in popular England and Europe during the 14th to 16th centuries

== Middle East ==
- Almond milk – Plant milk manufactured from almonds
- Börek – known from 14th-century Persia in a poem by Bushaq-i-Atima, although it may be far older.
- Hummus – first mentioned in a cookbook from Syria from the 13th century.
- Lauzinaj – Medieval Arabic and Persian almond confection
- Muhallebi – Milk-based dessert pudding
- Murri – Arabian condiment

== See also ==
- List of ancient dishes
- List of historical cuisines
- Timeline of food
