= Sate lilit =

Indonesian satay dish from Bali

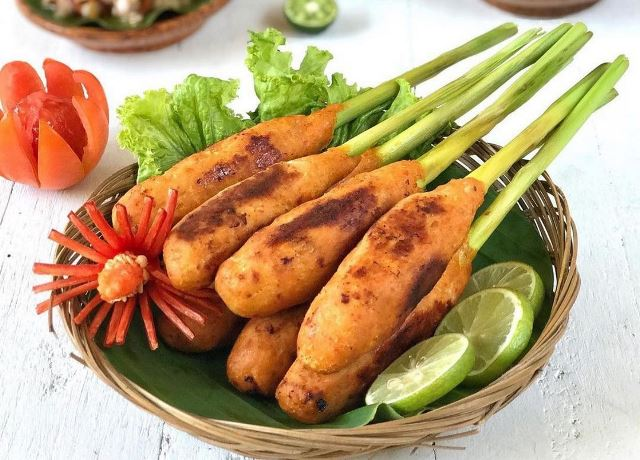
- The term 'lilit' in Balinese and in Indonesian means "to wrap". The wider surface allows the minced meat to adhere.
- Course: Main course or appetizer
- Place of origin: Indonesia
- Region or state: Bali and Nationwide in Indonesia, also popular in Southeast Asia
- Serving temperature: Hot
- Main ingredients: Minced meat (pork, chicken, fish or beef) spiced and wrapped around bamboo or lemongrass stick, and grilled over charcoal.

Sate lilit (Aksara Bali: ᬲᬢᬾᬮᬶᬮᬶᬢ᭄) is a satay variant in Indonesia, originating from Balinese cuisine. This satay is made from minced pork, fish, chicken, beef, or even turtle meat, which is then mixed with grated coconut, thick coconut milk, lemon juice, shallots, and pepper. The spiced minced meat is wound around bamboo, sugar cane or lemongrass sticks, it is then grilled on charcoal. Unlike skewers of other satay recipes which is made narrow and sharp, the bamboo skewer of sate lilit is flat and wide. This wider surface allowed the minced meat to stick and settle. The term lilit in Balinese and Indonesian means "to wrap around", which corresponds to its making method to wrapping around instead of skewering the meat.

== Variants ==
As a Hindu majority island, the Balinese authentic version prefer pork and fish over other meat, and beef is originally seldom consumed in Bali. However, to cater to larger consumer groups that do not consume pork, such as the Indonesian Muslim majority, in Balinese restaurants outside of Bali, sate lilit often uses chicken or beef instead. In Balinese fishing towns, such as the village of Kusamba, which faces the Nusa Penida Strait, sate lilit made from minced fish is favoured.

Two of the favorite satay variants in Bali are sate lilit, and sate ikan (fish satay). Although there are sate lilit recipes made with minced fish, sate ikan uses a chunk of fish meat instead. The authentic Balinese sate lilit and sate ikan are rich in bumbu, a mixture of spices and herbs. In Bali, almost every dish is flavored with bumbu megenep — a mix of spices and herbs ranging from lime leaves, to coconut milk, garlic, shallots, blue galangal, coriander, lesser galangal, turmeric and chili pepper.

== Gallery ==
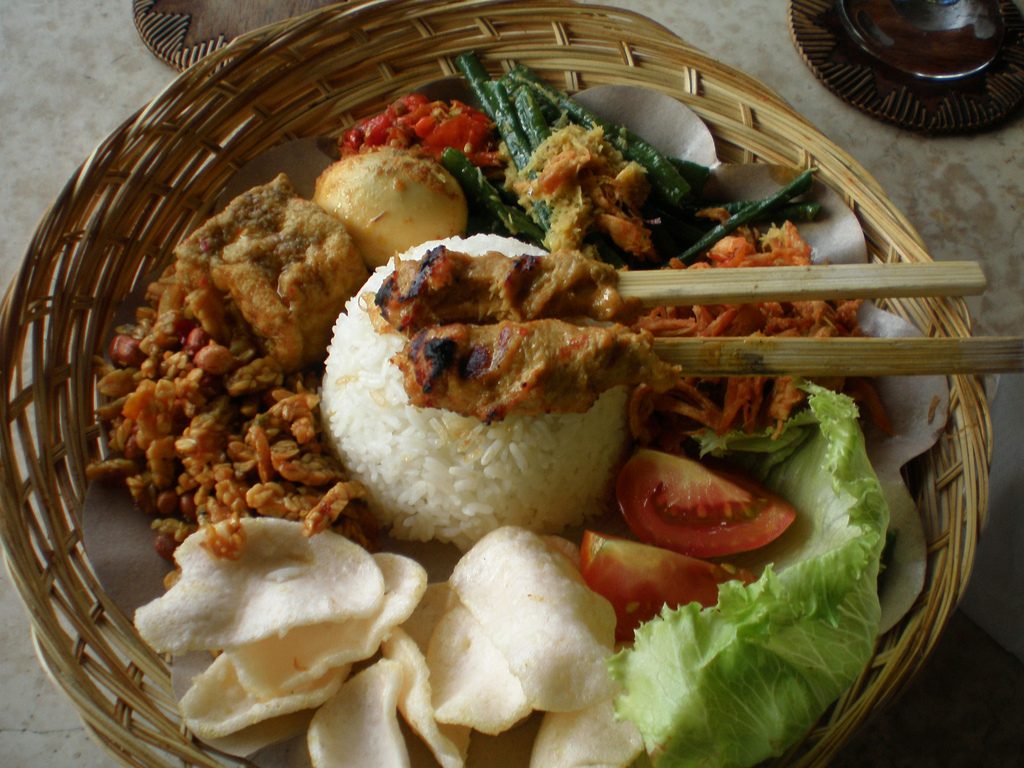
Balinese nasi campur topped with sate lilit.

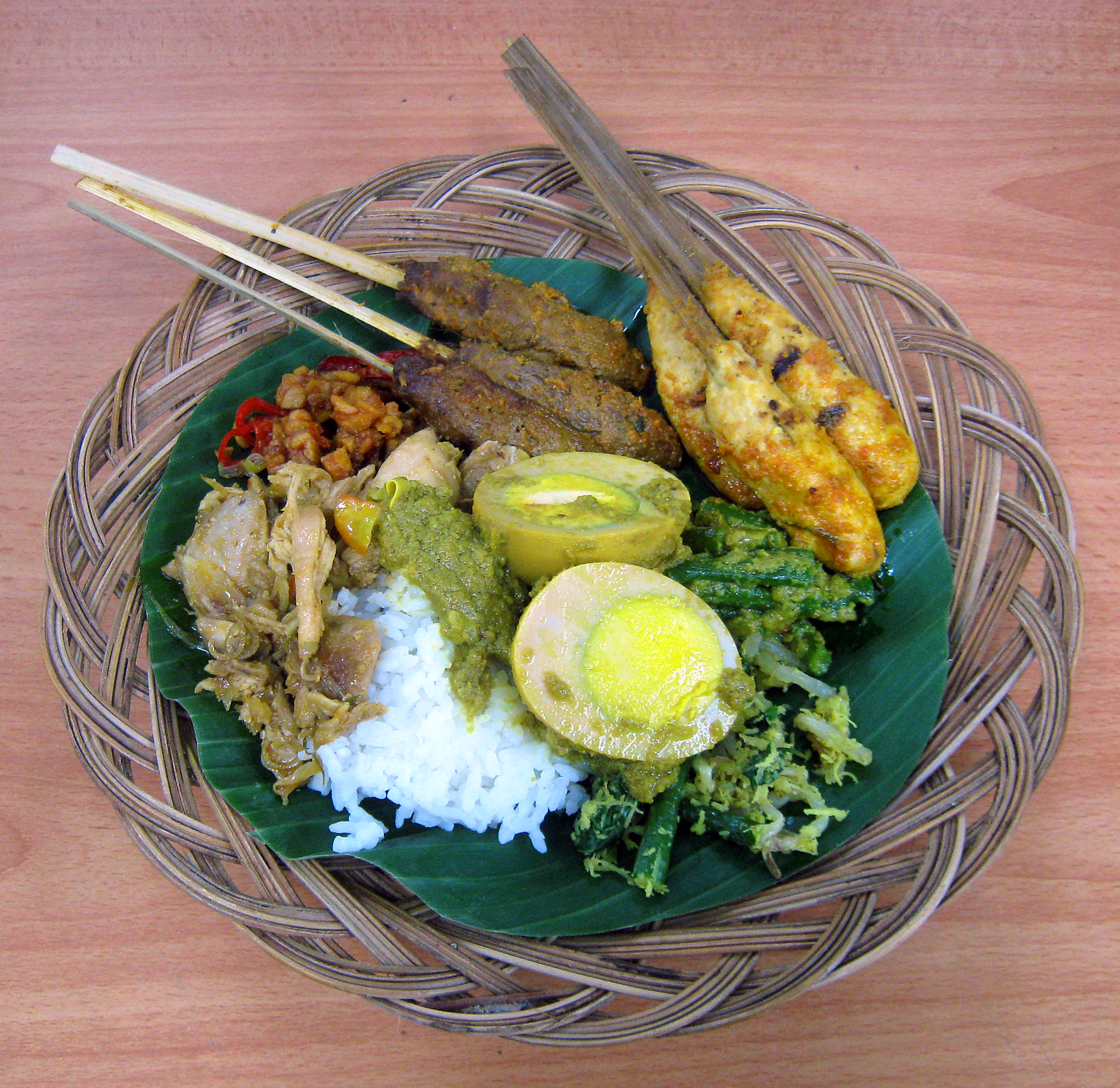
Balinese nasi campur with two types of sate lilit, beef and fish.

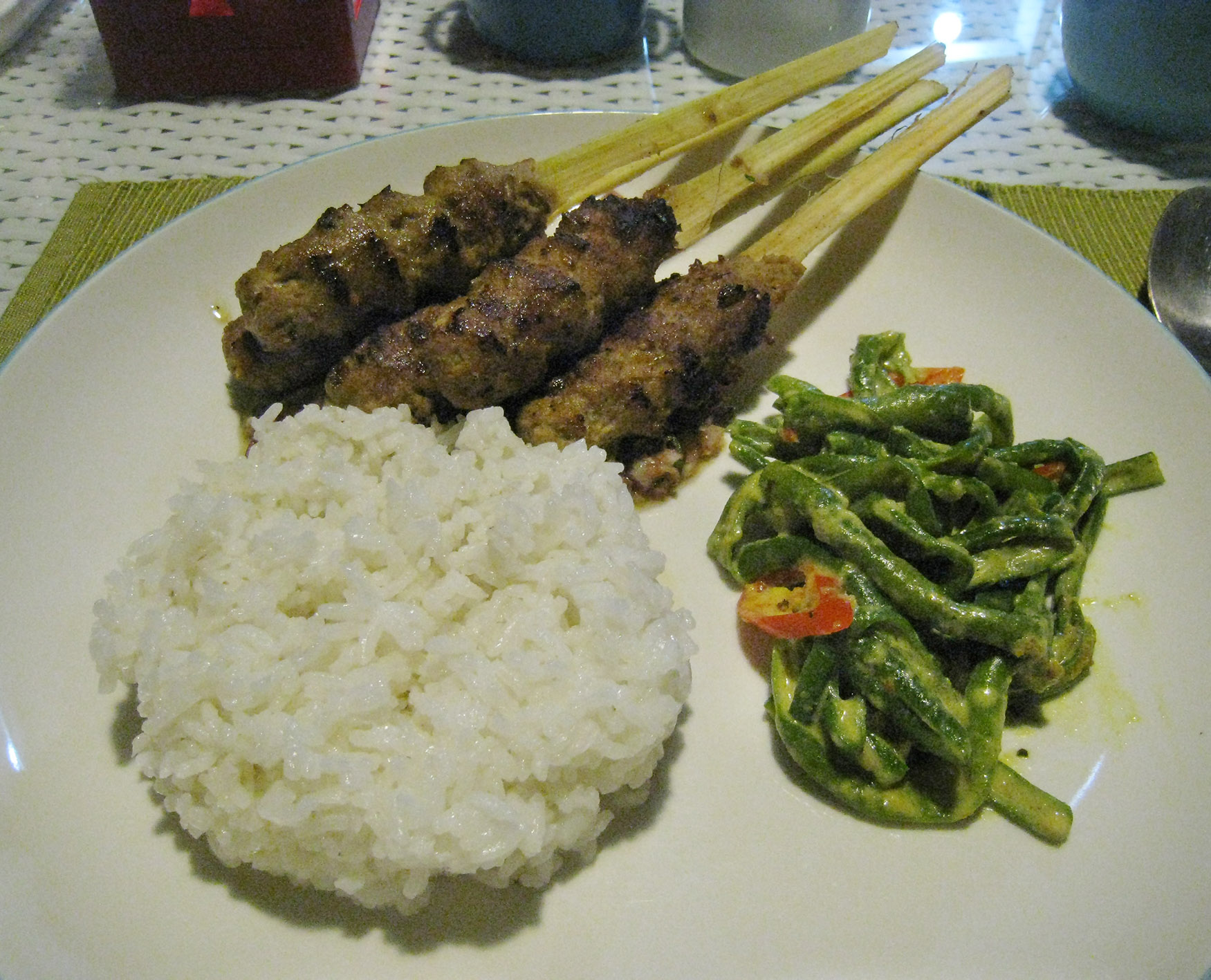
Pork sate lilit served in Bali.

== See also ==
- Satay
- Sate padang
- Sate kambing
- Nasi campur
- Lawar
