= Trancam =

Typical dish of Central Java

Trancam is a typical dish of Central Java which is similar to urap, consisting of bean sprouts, long beans, lemon basil leaves and finely sliced napa cabbage. Everything is served fresh, stirred with grated coconut and seasoned with garlic, chili pepper and kencur.

According to sajiansedap.com via Kompas.com, trancam is one of urap variants. Most of the ingredients are still raw including vegetables and seasonings, except the coconut which is steamed.

== See also ==
- Javanese cuisine
