= Betutu =

Indonesian steamed/roasted chicken and duck dish

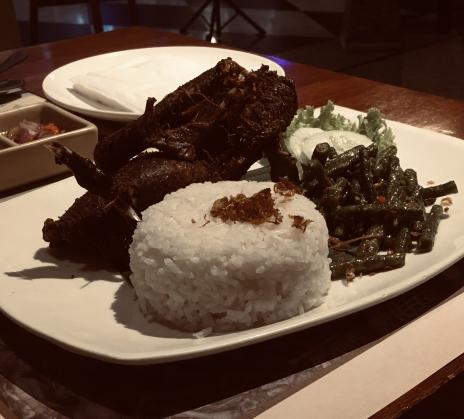
- Bebek betutu served with rice and green beans
- Course: Main course
- Place of origin: Indonesia
- Region or state: Bali and Lombok, Nationwide
- Serving temperature: Hot or room temperature
- Main ingredients: Roasted chicken or duck in spices

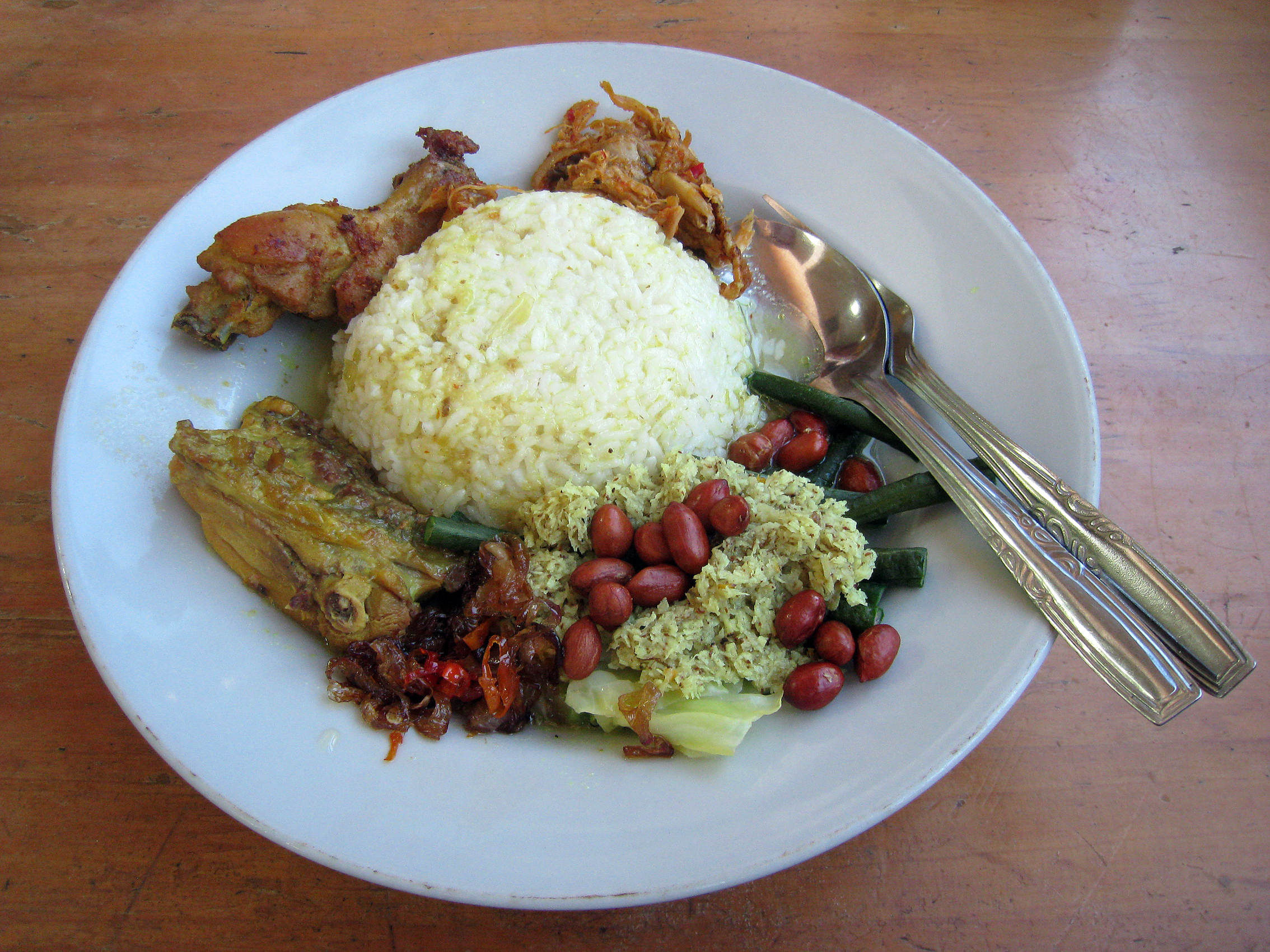
Nasi campur Bali with ayam betutu

Betutu (Balinese script: ᬩᭂᬢᬸᬢᬸ) is a Balinese dish of steamed or roasted chicken or duck in rich bumbu betutu (betutu spice mix). This highly seasoned and spiced dish is a popular dish in Bali and Lombok, Indonesia. An even spicier version is available using extra-spicy sauce made from uncooked (raw) onion slices mixed with red chili peppers and coconut oil.

Betutu is a richly spiced Balinese poultry dish. It is often called according to its main ingredients; ayam betutu is chicken betutu, while bebek betutu is the duck version. This traditional dish can be found on the menu of luxury hotels or restaurants in Bali, and it is popular among tourists.

== Spice mixture ==
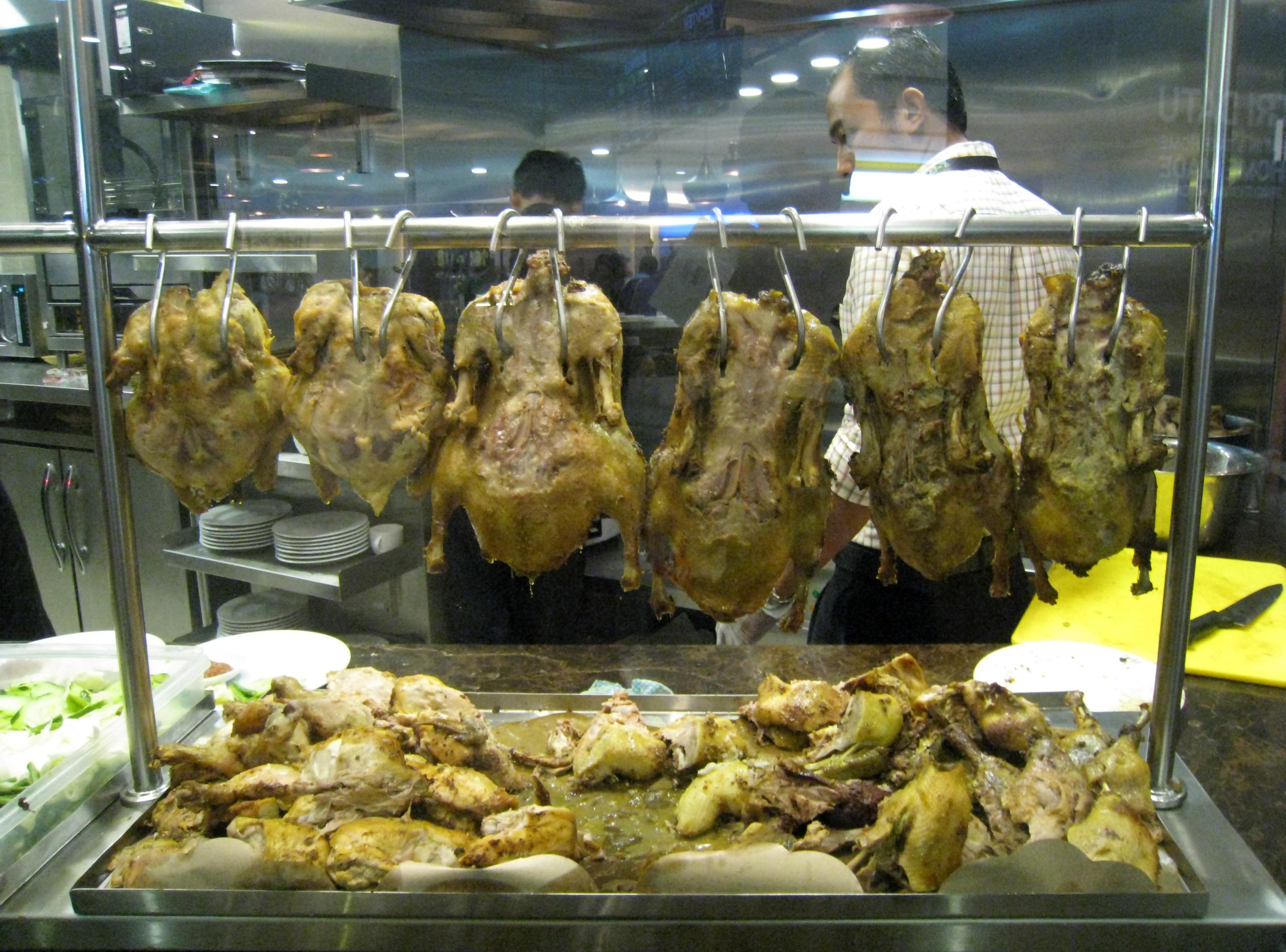
Chicken betutu (two left) and duck betutu (four right) hanged in a restaurant in Ngurah Rai Airport, Bali.

The term betutu is the Balinese word for a certain spice mixture (bumbu) which consist of shallots, garlic, turmeric, ginger, wild ginger, galangal, candle nuts, chili peppers, shrimp paste, and peanuts all finely ground using mortar and pestle. The betutu spice paste is sauteed with coconut oil to release its aroma and then applied to poultry, chicken, or duck. Common side dishes may include plecing kangkung, crispy-fried peanuts, and sambal terasi.

== Regional differences ==
In Bali, betutu's tastes and ways of cooking are different according to regions: in Klungkung and Karangasem, chicken is stuffed with betutu spices; in Gianyar, betutu is cooked with plantain leaf wrapping; and in Gilimanuk, betutu is rather hot and spicy.

== See also ==
- Cuisine of Indonesia
- Kapampangan cuisine (Philippine) which has Betute and Nasing biringyi.
- List of duck dishes
