= Balinese cuisine =

Culinary traditions of Bali, Indonesia

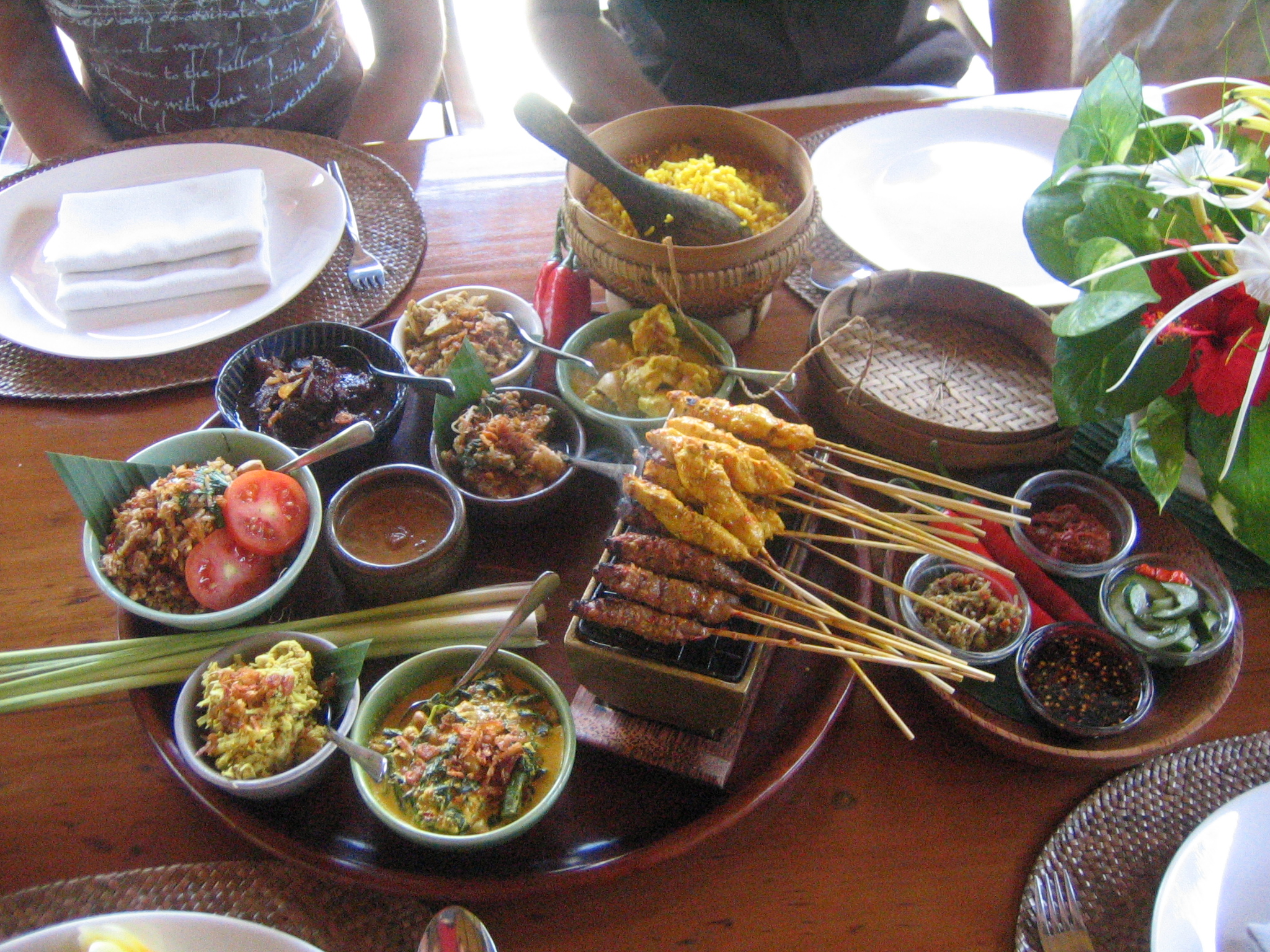
Examples of Balinese dishes, such as sate lilit, nasi kuning, lawar, and lalah manis sambal condiment

Balinese cuisine is a cuisine tradition of Balinese people from the volcanic island of Bali. Using a variety of spices, blended with the fresh vegetables, meat and fish. Part of Indonesian cuisine, it demonstrates indigenous traditions, as well as influences from other Indonesian regional cuisine, Chinese and Indian. The island's inhabitants are predominantly Hindu and culinary traditions are somewhat distinct with the rest of Indonesia, with festivals and religious celebrations including many special foods prepared as the offerings for the deities, as well as other dishes consumed communally during the celebrations.

Rice, the primary grain is almost always consumed as a staple accompanied with vegetables, meat and seafood. Pork, chicken, fruit, vegetables and seafood are widely utilized, however as in most Hindu communities, beef is never or rarely consumed.

Bali is a popular tourist destination, and the area has many cooking schools with daily courses of Balinese cuisine. Night markets, warungs (food stands), and fruit vendors sell local delicacies. Festivals include ornately prepared foods as part of the celebrations. As a popular tourist area, many westernized foods are also available as well.

== Ingredients ==
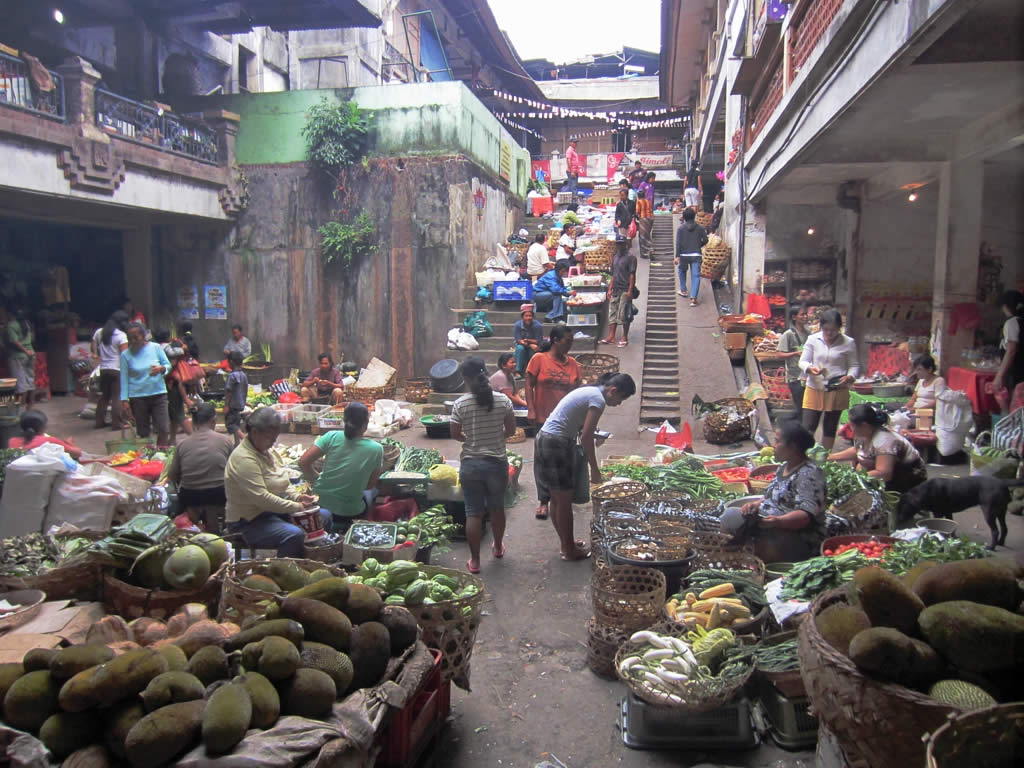
Pasar pagi, morning wet market selling fruits and vegetables in Ubud.

Steamed rice is commonly consumed in every meal. Pork, chicken, seafood and vegetables are widely consumed. As Hindus however, Balinese never or rarely consume beef. This restriction is especially observed by those who belong to Brahmin and Kshatriya castes. Nevertheless, lesser Gusti (nobles) and common Balinese people might consume beef, albeit rarely.

Spices include Kaempferia galanga (galangal), shallots, garlic, turmeric, ginger and Kaffir lime are used in Balinese cuisine. Balinese 8-spice is made with white pepper, black pepper, coriander, cumin, clove, nutmeg, sesame seed, and candlenut. Palm sugar, fish paste, and basa gede (a spice paste) are used.

Fruits include rambutan, mangoes, mangosteen, bananas, markisa (passion fruit), nangka (jackfruit), pineapple, salak (snake fruit), duku, kelengkeng (longan), wani (white mango or Mangifera caesia), papaya, melon, oranges, custard-apple, coconut and durian.

== Traditions, serving and outlets ==
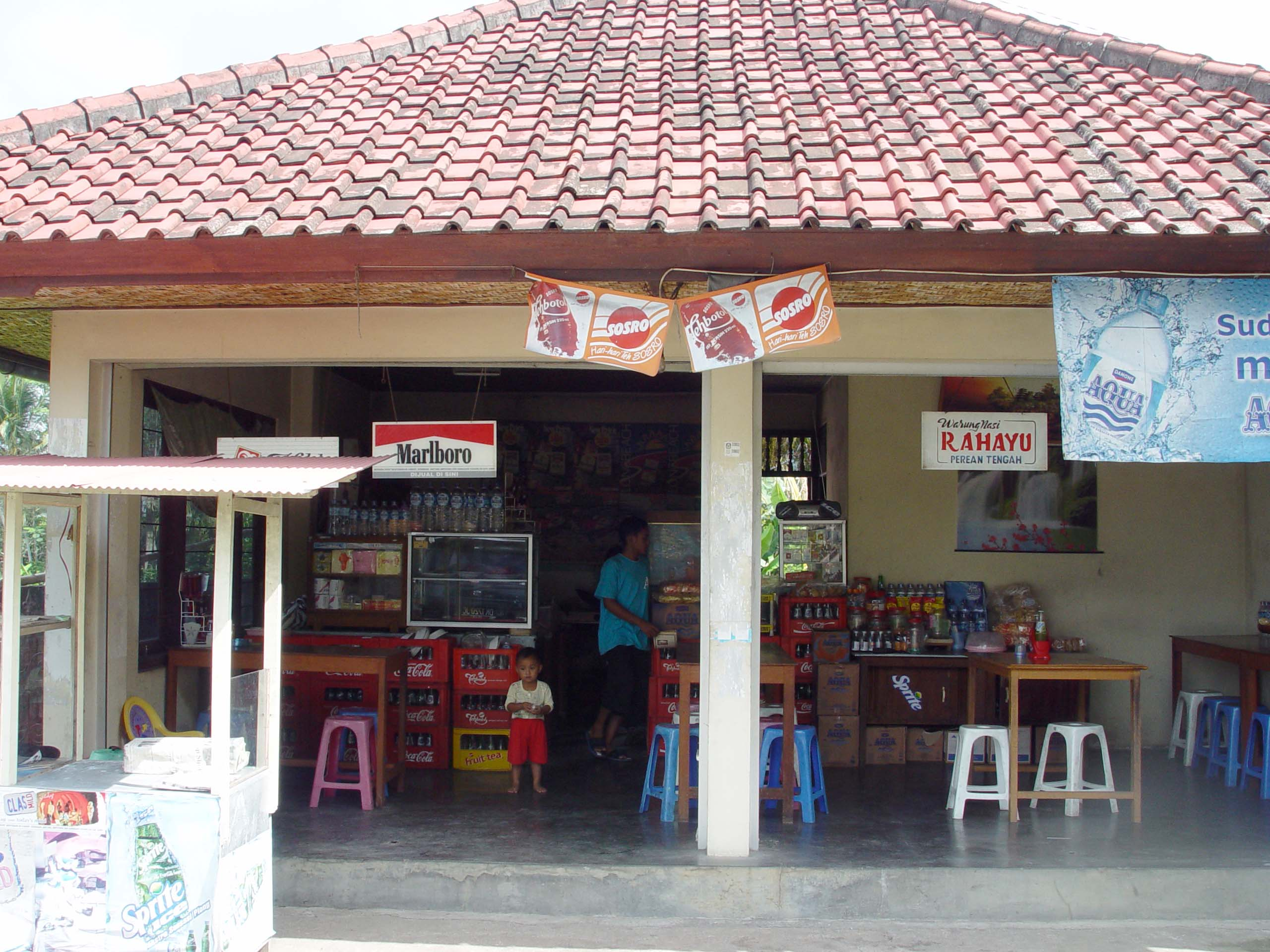
A warung in Bali.

In Hindu Balinese traditions, certain foodstuffs are served in religious rituals, used as an offering for gods. During religious ceremony, festively decorated fruits and foodstuff are brought to the temple as an offering. Balinese believed that certain foodstuff is an appropriate offering for certain deities. For example, pork is favoured by Batara Kala, while ducks are favoured by Hindu gods, such as Brahma. Certain rare foodstuff such as turtle meat is also used in rituals.

Balinese households usually purchase fresh ingredients from the local market every morning, cook and serve them in the late morning to be mainly consumed for lunch. The leftovers are stored to be heated again for family dinner. Other than homemade family dishes, Balinese cuisine are served from humble street side carts and warungs, to fancy restaurants in resorts and five-star hotels. Small family-run warungs are the budget options for street food, serving everything from family dishes for full meals, or snack foods.

Balinese warungs or restaurants usually specified on certain menu, for example there are restaurants that specialized on solely serving babi guling (suckling pig), bebek betutu (crispy duck), or nasi campur (Balinese mixed rice). Some warung specialized on selling tipat cantok (similar to kupat tahu) or nasi jinggo mixed rice.

== Rice ==
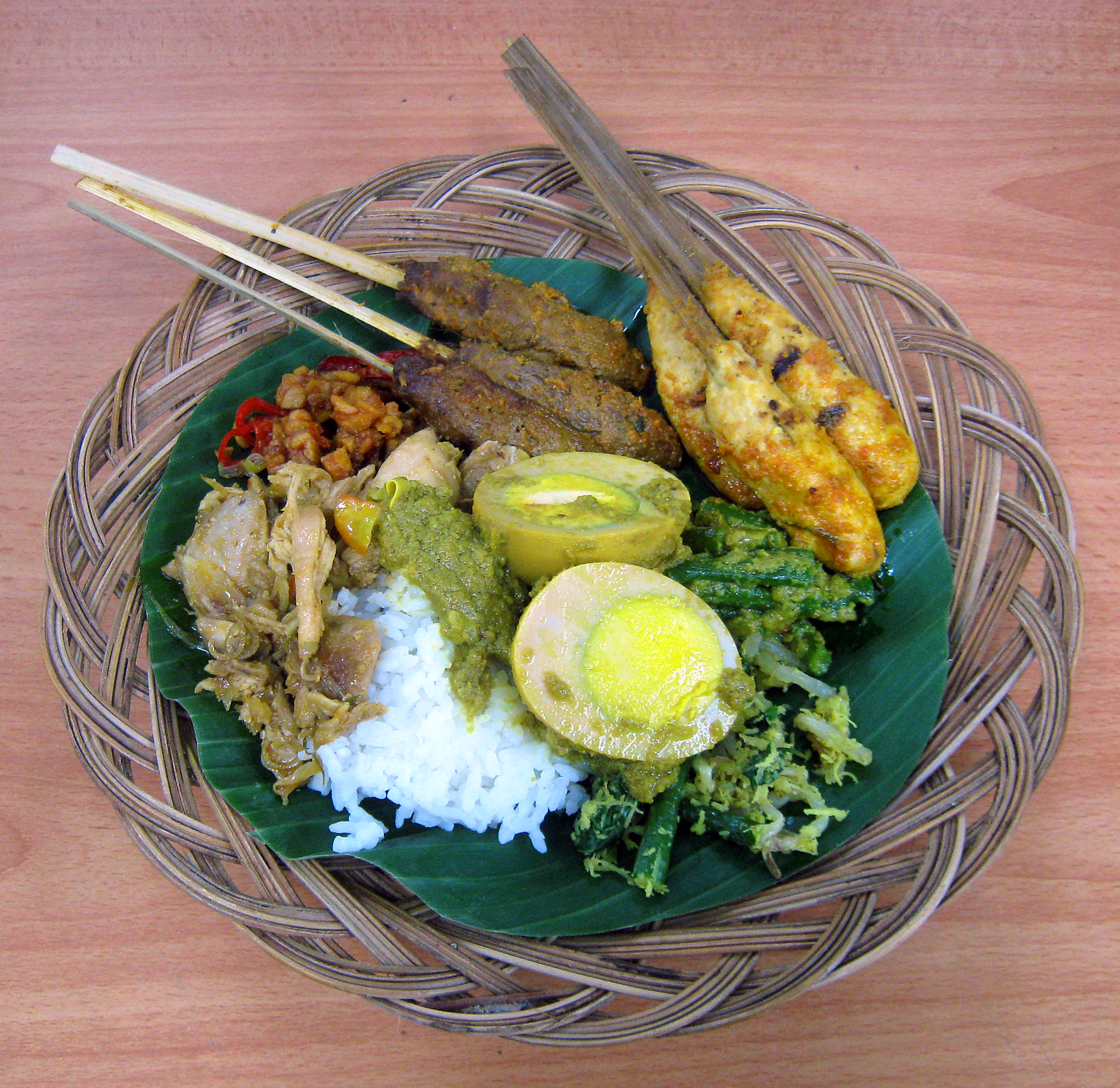
Balinese nasi campur with meat and fish versions of sate lilit

Bali has a strong rice agriculture tradition in Indonesia, as evidence through centuries old intricate network of sophisticated Subak irrigation system. The Balinese water temples regulates the water allocation of each village's ricefields in the region. Balinese Hinduism revered Dewi Sri as an important rice goddess. Her and other deities colorful effigies made from colorful sticky rice are often made during religious ceremonies.

== Spices and seasonings ==
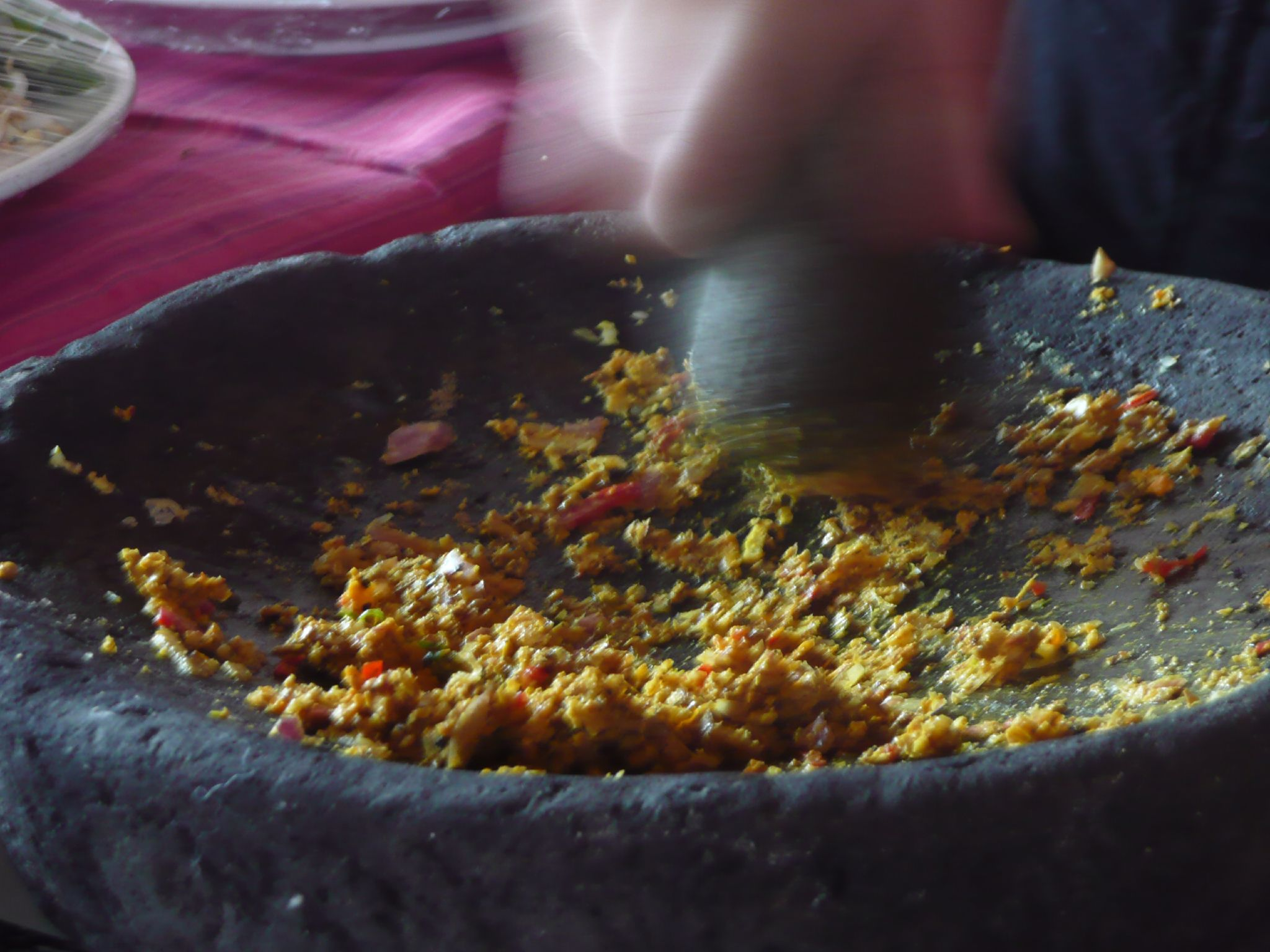
Making Balinese basa gede bumbu using pestle and mortar

Basa gede, also known as basa rajang, is a spice paste that is a basic ingredient in many Balinese dishes. Basa gede form the cornerstone of many Balinese dishes. Its ingredients include garlic, red chili peppers, Asian shallots, nutmeg, ginger, turmeric, palm sugar, cumin, shrimp paste and salam leaves (Indonesian bay leaf).

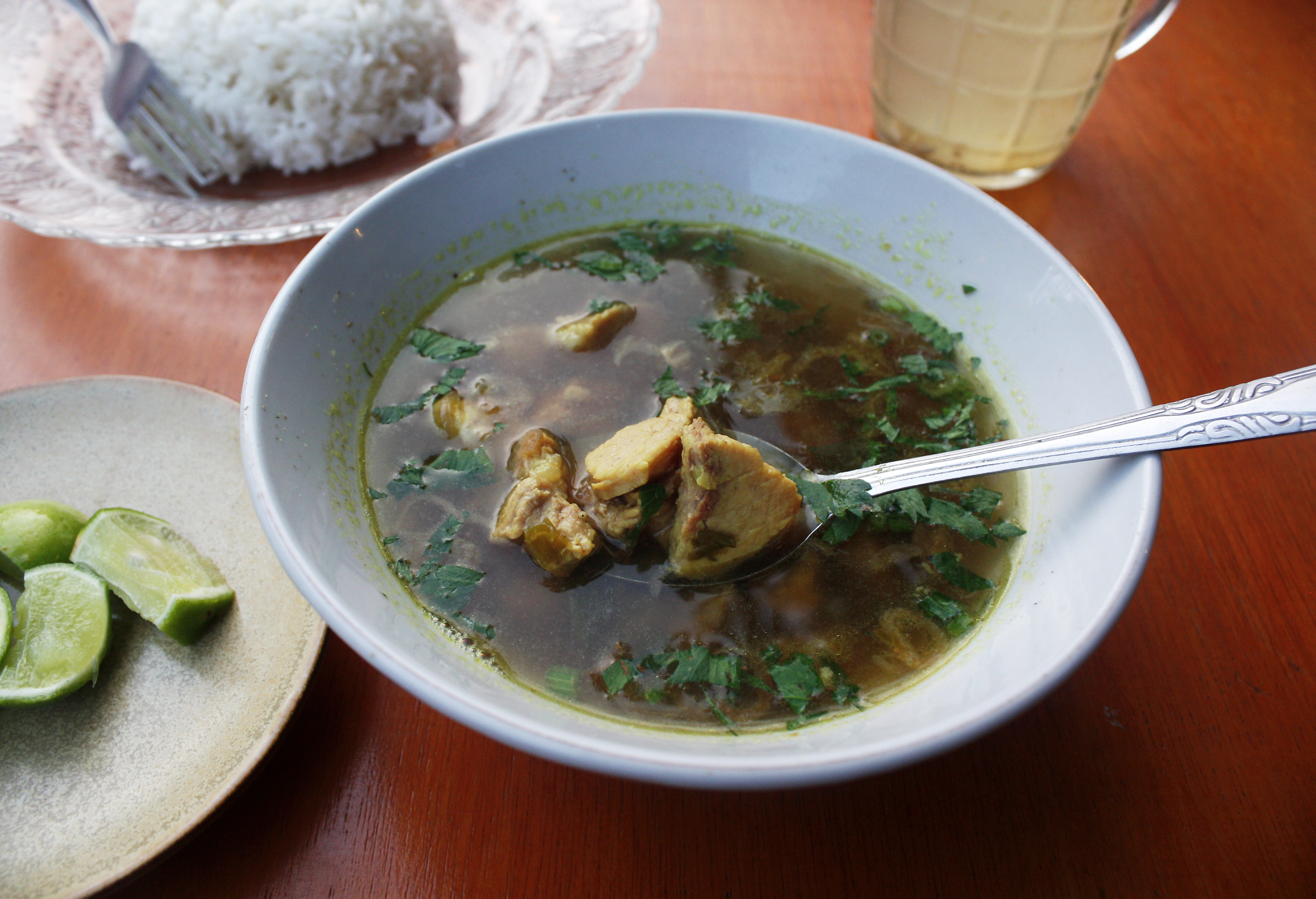
Soto babi, Balinese pork soto

Balinese dishes are punctuated by basa genep, the typical Balinese spice mix used as the base for many curry and vegetable dishes. As well as bumbu (seasoning) used as a marinade. Tabia lala manis, which is a thin soy sauce with chili peppers, and sambal matah are popular condiments.

== Dishes ==
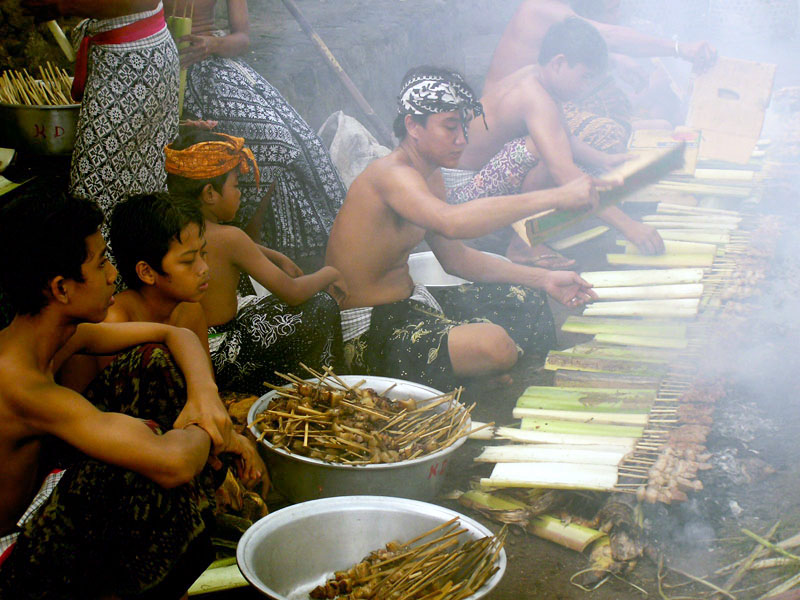
Balinese preparing pork satay for communal religious ceremony

Balinese foods include lawar (chopped coconut, garlic, chili pepper, with pork or chicken meat and blood), Bebek betutu (duck stuffed with spices, wrapped in banana leaves and coconut husks cooked in a pit of embers), Balinese sate known as sate lilit made from spiced mince pressed onto skewers which are often lemongrass sticks, Babi guling also known as cel eng guling (a spit-roasted pig stuffed with chili peppers, turmeric, garlic, and ginger).

In Bali, the mixed rice is called nasi campur Bali or simply nasi Bali. The Balinese nasi campur version of mixed rice may have grilled tuna, fried tofu, cucumber, spinach, tempe, beef cubes, vegetable curry, corn, chili sauce on the bed of rice. Mixed rice is often sold by street vendors, wrapped in a banana leaf.

Betutu is eaten in Bali as well as Lombok, and West Nusa Tenggara. It is a roasted poultry dish (chicken or duck) with spices. Lawar is a traditional vegetable and meat dish in Bali Vegetable and meat dish served with rice. It consists of shredded unripe jackfruit, young banana flower, a liberal amount of pork rind bits, raw pig blood. These are mashed with herbs such as lemon grass, kaffir lime leaves, shallots, and garlic. Babi guling is a Balinese-style roast pork comparable to Hawaiian luau-style pig.

Other common Indonesian dishes are easily found, such as tempe and tofu are used. Sambal dishes are also served. Bakso, a meatball or meat paste made from beef surimi, can also be found.

=== List of dishes ===
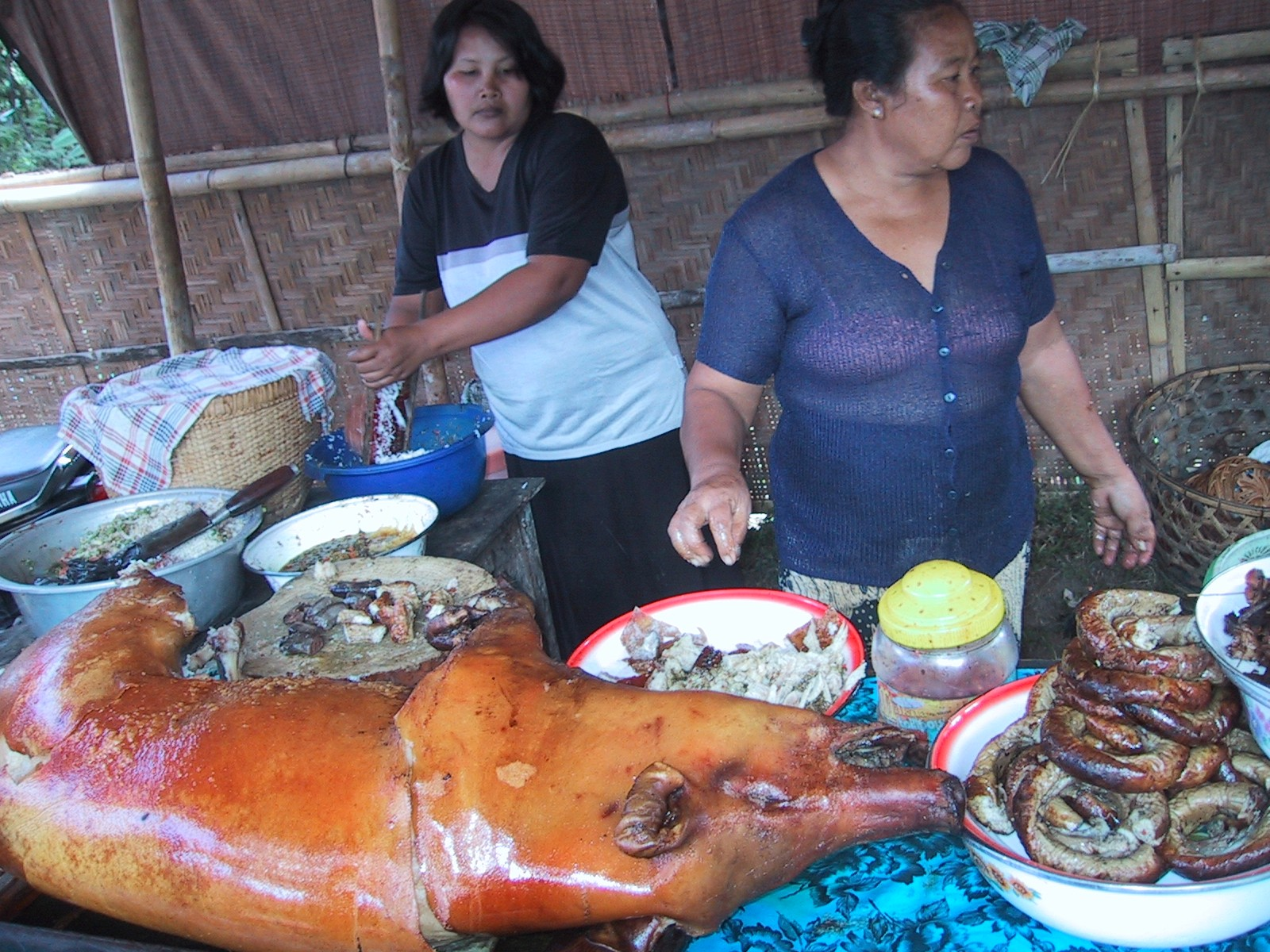
Balinese Babi guling or roasted suckling pig

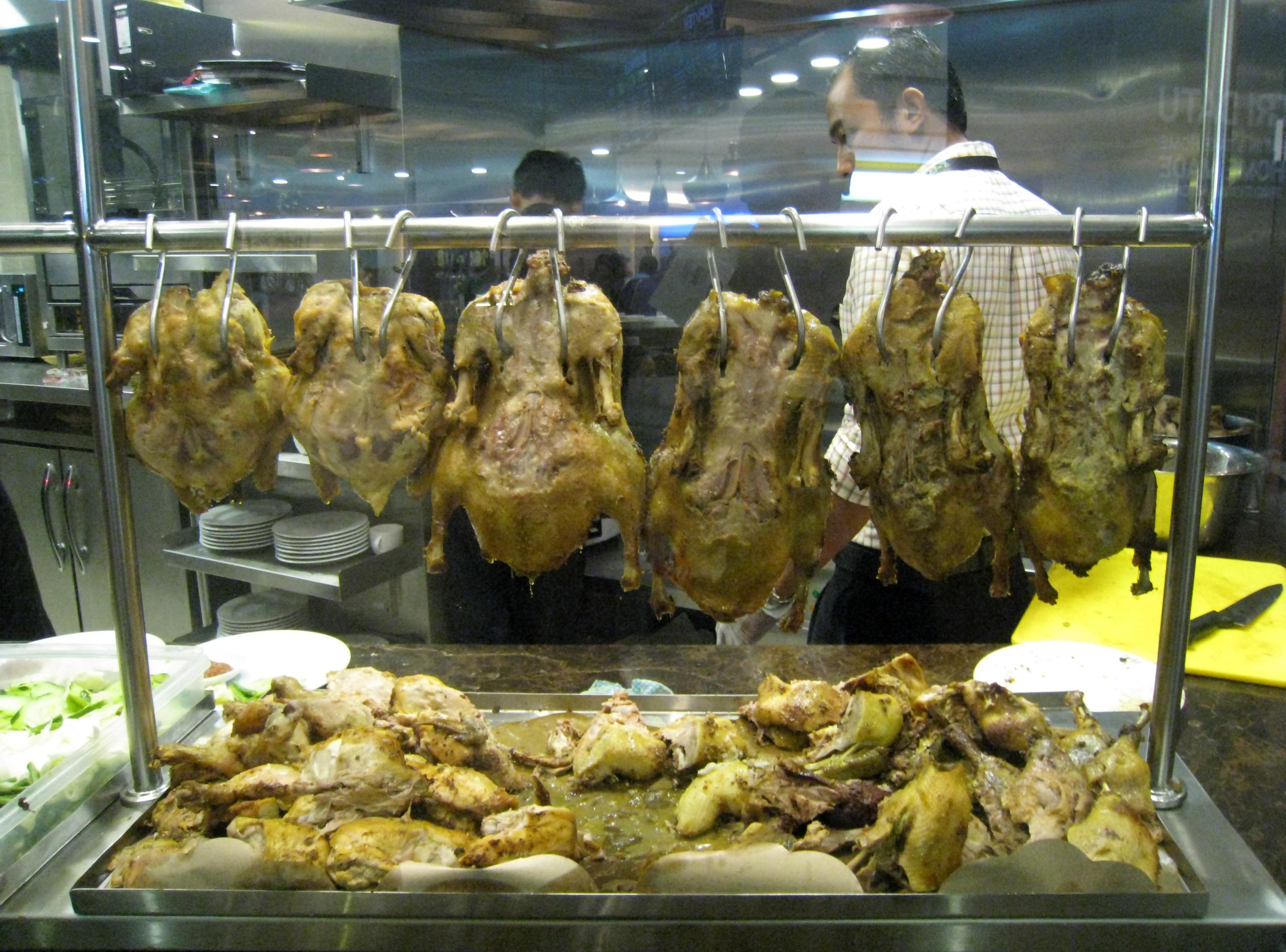
Chicken betutu (two left) and duck betutu (four right) hanged in a restaurant in Ngurah Rai Airport, Bali.

- Betutu, steamed or roasted poultry (chicken or duck) highly seasoned. A specialty of Bali.
- Babi Guling, roasted suckling pig, famous in Bali.
- Be Balung, pork (mostly) ribs soup, Be means meat and Balung means ribs.
- Iga Babi, Balinese pork ribs.
- Rawon babi, pork spicy stew similar to East Javanese rawon. This Balinese pork version however, is not using any keluak, thus the soup color is not black but rather light brownish grey instead. This meat soup is usually served to accompany nasi bali or babi guling.
- Sate Babi, pork satay.
- Sate Lilit, spiced minced meat on a stick.
- Soto Babi, pork soto.
- Soto Balung, pork rib soto.
- Soto Kesuna Cekuh, soto made using a spice mixture of white onions and aromatic ginger.
- Soto Kreneng, beef and radish soto
- Mujair Nyat-Nyat, Mujair fish cooked with Balinese spices served just like a fish in a mud (Nyat-Nyat means mud). It is easily found in Bangli, Northern Bali.
- Be Nyat-Nyat, just like Mujair Nyat-Nyat but this one is meat (mostly pork).
- Lawar, mixed vegetables, minced meats (pork or chicken or sometimes no meat if it is a vegetarian Lawar), spices, and other ingredients. There are two types the white one called Lawar Putih and the red one called Lawar Barak (the red colour comes from the meat bloods that mixed into it).
- Jukut Urab, Balinese mixed vegetables (a bit like salad) mixed with grated coconut.
- Tipat Cantok, Balinese salad with peanut sauce dressings. It contains tipat (a kind dumpling made from steamed rice wrapped in coconut leaves), vegetables, and tahu (an Indonesian tofu) .
- Nasi Bali, rice with various dishes.
- Nasi jinggo, a small portion of rice with various dishes wrapped with banana leaves (but nowadays can be found with kertas minyak). It is often found on pathway (from evening till night) and in warung (in the morning) and sometimes eaten as a breakfast.
- Basa Genep, Balinese bumbu or spices commonly used as flavouring agent for chicken, fish or meat.
- Sambal Matah, literally means 'raw sauce' (Sambal is Indonesian sauce, Matah is a Balinese word means raw). It contains minced garlics, onions, chili peppers, shallots, lime, and lemongrass mixed with coconut oil (the most important ingredient; it cannot be changed with any other oils, coconut oil can be easily found in Bali since it is a very useful oil for Balinese and the grandparents still made it homemade).
- Sambal Bongkot, a Balinese sambal with Bongkot (Torch Ginger/Kecombrang).
- Sambal Embe, a Balinese Sambal made from sautee sliced garlic, onions, chili peppers, salt, and terasi (condiment made from pounded and fermented shrimp or small fish). It is also used in a Balinese traditional offerings.
- Tipat cantok, a Balinese tipat rice cake with vegetables served in peanut sauce dressing, akin to gado-gado and pecel.
- Urutan, a Balinese traditional pork (mostly) sausage.
- Laklak, a Balinese traditional little pancake with grated coconut and melted palm sugar.
- Bubuh Sum-Sum, rice porridge with palm sugar sauce and grated coconut.
- Bubuh Injin black sticky rice with grated coconut and melted palm sugar.
- Bantal, packages of sticky rice, coconut, sugar and fruit (often bananas or sometimes orange rind or even mango essence).
- Sumping Waluh, steamed cakes from rice flour mixed with Waluh (Balinese word for pumpkin) wrapped in banana leaves.
- Sumping Biu, steamed cakes from rice flour with Biu (Balinese word for banana) inside of it and wrapped with banana leaves.
- Kopi luwak (luwak coffee), also called civet coffee or “poo coffee”. It is named after the practice of weasel-like animals called civets let loose into coffee plantations at night to eat coffee berries then defecate out the coffee beans which are collected, washed and roasted over a fire.
- Jukut Undis, is a traditional soup dish made from Gude beans (also known as kayo beans or Cajanus cajan), a petite black legume reminiscent of soybean but with a deep black color.
- Jukut Ares is a flavorful Balinese soup that features the delicate and succulent stalks of young banana trees as its main ingredient.

== Beverages ==
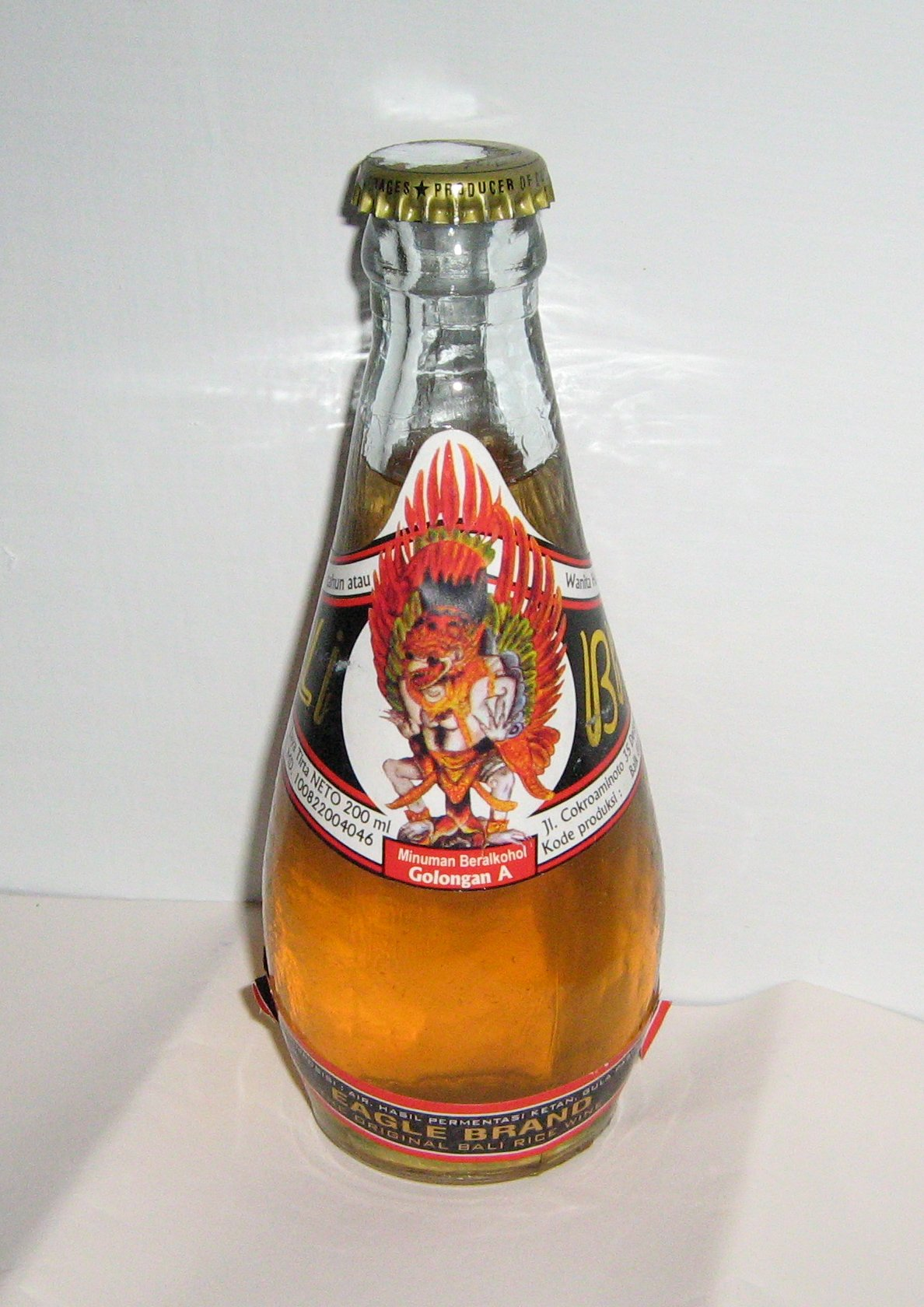
Brem, a Balinese rice wine

Balinese coffee, Kopi Bali, and hot tea, teh panas are popular. Tea is often served with sugar (gula) and condensed milk, susu. Cold drinks such as iced tea are more commonly consumed than hot drinks.

Brem is Balinese rice wine. It is made from fermented mash of black or white glutinous rice (known as ketan) using a dry starter called ragi tape. Daluman is a Balinese ice drink made with cincau jelly leaf, coconut milk, palm sugar syrup, and shaved ice.

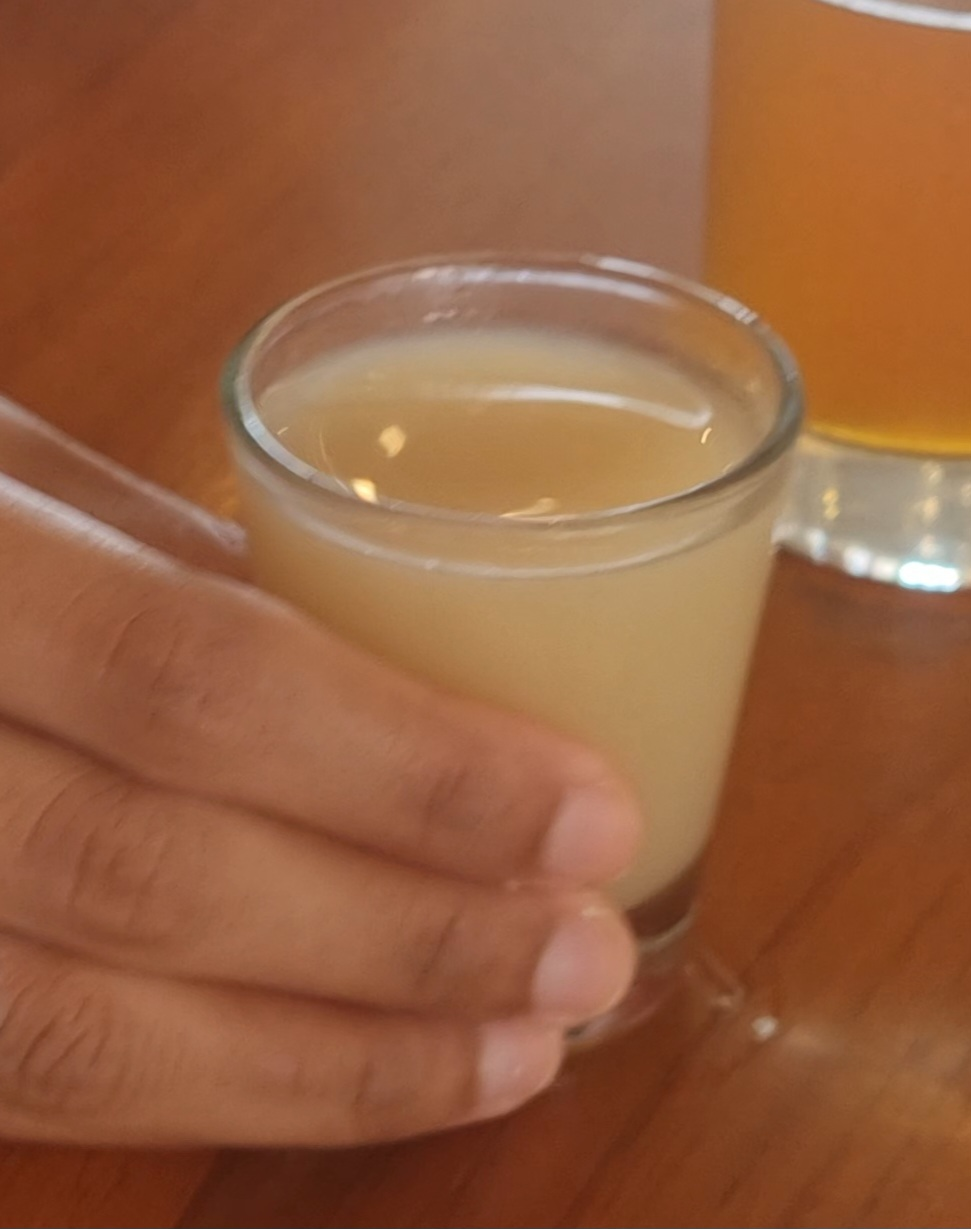
Jamu made with ginger

Jamu is an old Indonesian traditional drink that is also popular in Bali. It is usually prepared with ginger or turmeric juice and other varying ingredients such as lime and honey.

== See also ==
- Javanese cuisine
- Sundanese cuisine
