= Nasi jinggo =

Balinese dish

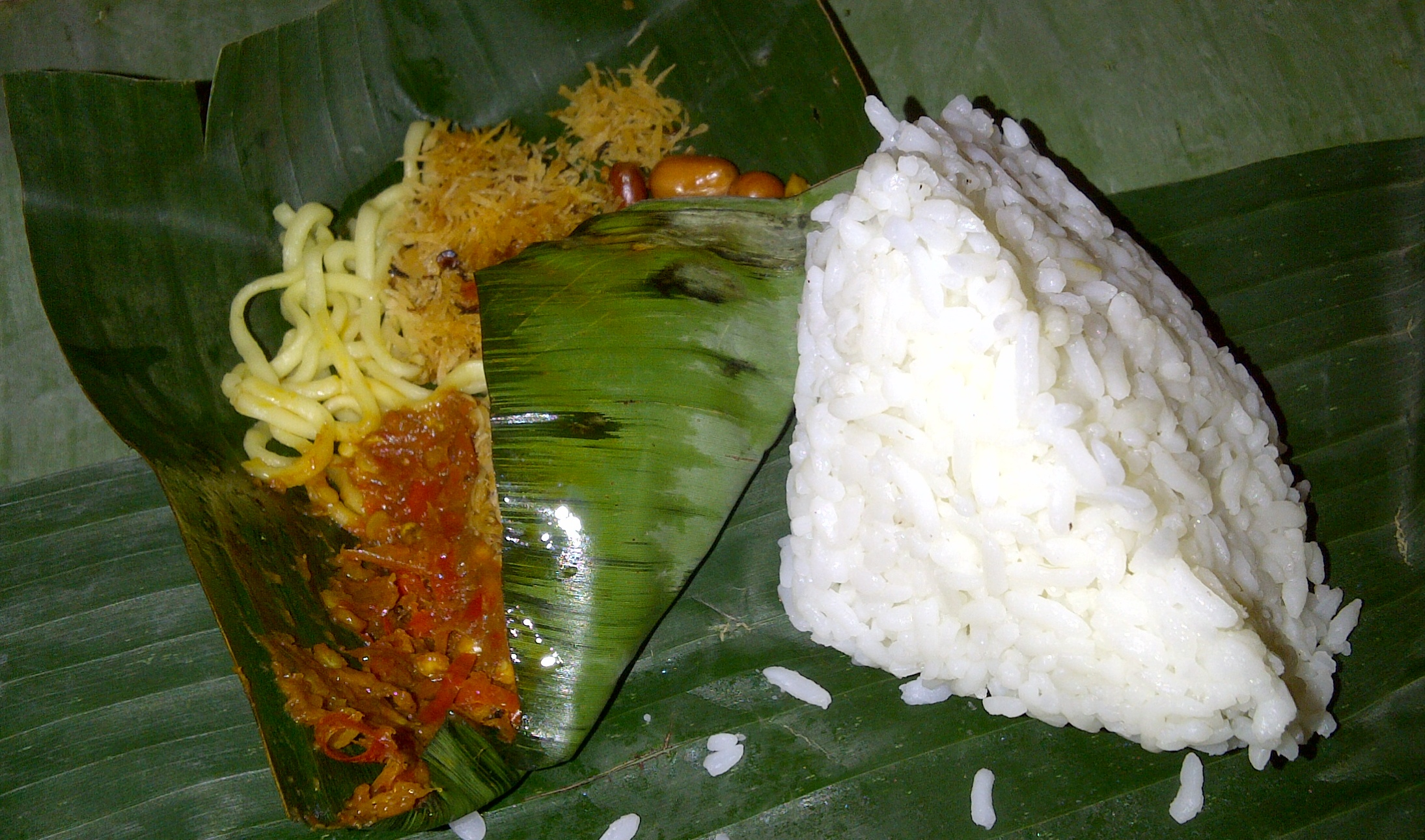
- A serving of nasi jinggo
- Course: Main course
- Place of origin: Indonesia
- Region or state: Bali
- Serving temperature: Hot or room temperature
- Main ingredients: Small portion of rice with various side dishes wrapped inside a banana leaf

Nasi jinggo (also known as jinggo rice) is a Balinese ready-to-eat street food, packaged in small portions of banana leaves. Apart from being eaten as street food, nasi jinggo is also used in various religious ceremonies such as the Ngaben funeral rites, birthday celebrations, and meetings.

== Etymology ==
The origin of the term "jinggo" is uncertain. One theory states that prior to the 1997 Asian financial crisis, nasi jenggo had been sold for Rp. 1500 (approximately $0.1 USD in 2025) — in the Chinese Hokkien language, jeng go means "one thousand five hundred". Another theory is that it comes from the title of the 1966 Italian Spaghetti Western film Django, while another version states that it comes from the word jagoan, referring to Balinese motorcyclists, whose favorite food after a night out was nasi jinggo.

== History ==
The history of nasi jinggo began in the 1980s, and was first sold on Gajah Mada Street in Denpasar, Bali. Due to the proximity of the 24-hour Kumbasari Market, a Javanese husband-wife team began selling the dish as a late-night snack. The popularity of nasi jinggo has spread beyond Bali to other parts of Indonesia.

== Presentation ==
Nasi jinggo is served in a banana leaf package, containing a handful of white rice with side dishes and chili sauce. The side dishes are typically sambal goreng tempeh (tempeh, anchovies, and peanuts fried with sambal) serundeng (sautéed grated coconut), and shredded chicken. Nasi jinggo can also be made with yellow rice, while side dishes can be beef or pork. Nasi jinggo is also sometimes served with mie goreng (fried noodles) and eggs.

== Gallery ==
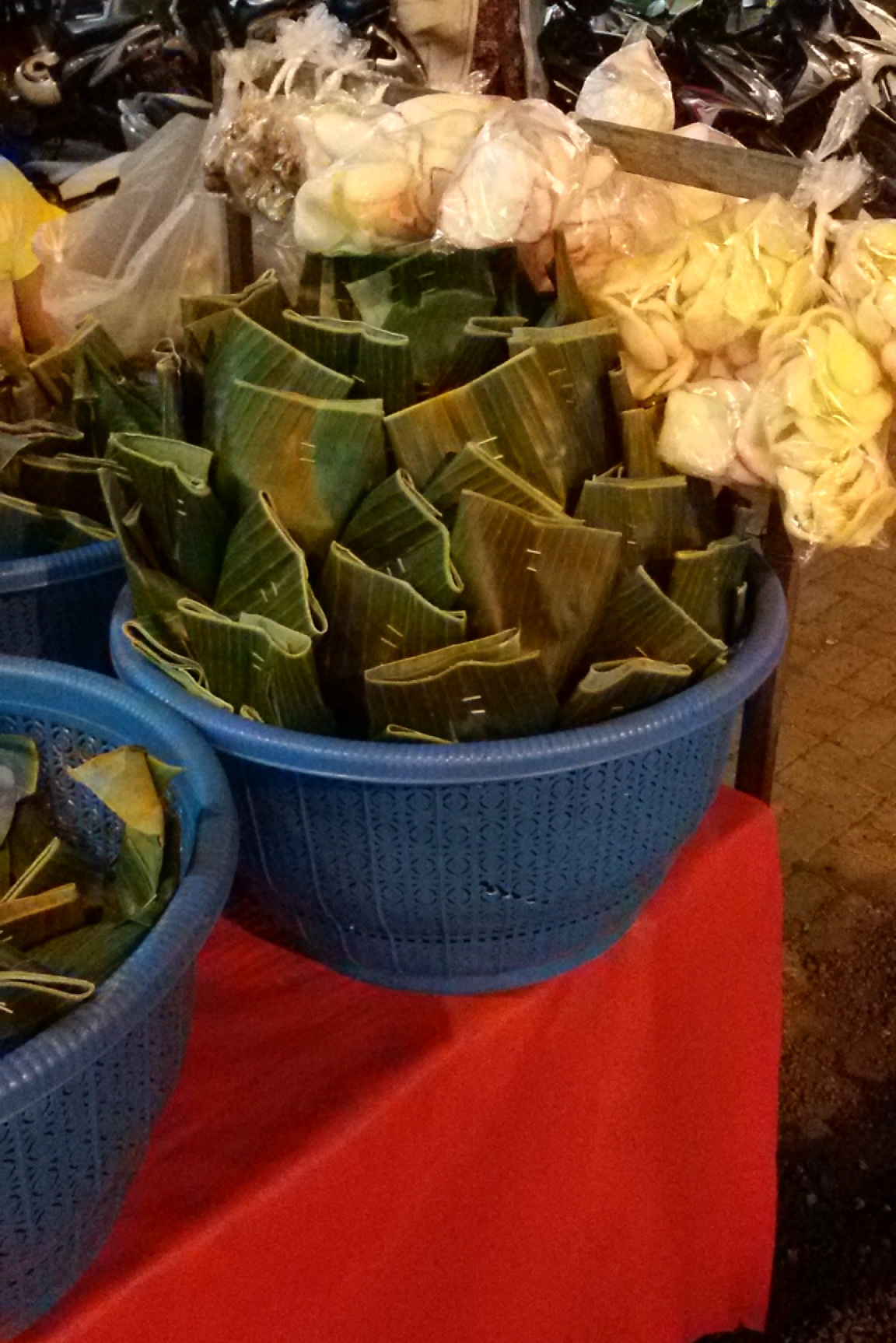
A nasi jinggo stand in Denpasar, Bali

== See also ==
- Nasi kucing
