= Kuluban =

Indonesian traditional salad dish

- Course: Side dish
- Place of origin: Java, Indonesia
- Region or state: Central Java, Yogyakarta
- Created by: Javanese cuisine
- Serving temperature: Mostly served with main course
- Main ingredients: Steamed vegetable salad, shredded coconut dressing

Kuluban is a traditional salad of Central Java. Kuluban can be consumed on its own as a salad for vegetarian meals or as a side dish. Kuluban is one of ancient Javanese cuisine, as it was mentioned in inscription dated from Medang Mataram era circa 9th century CE.

== Ingredients ==
The vegetables which are usually used in Kuluban are string bean, petai, young jackfruit, orange leaf, bean sprouts, kencur, terasi, shredded young coconut, red pepper, salt, sugar. To acquire crispy texture, most recipes insist on adding kerupuk.

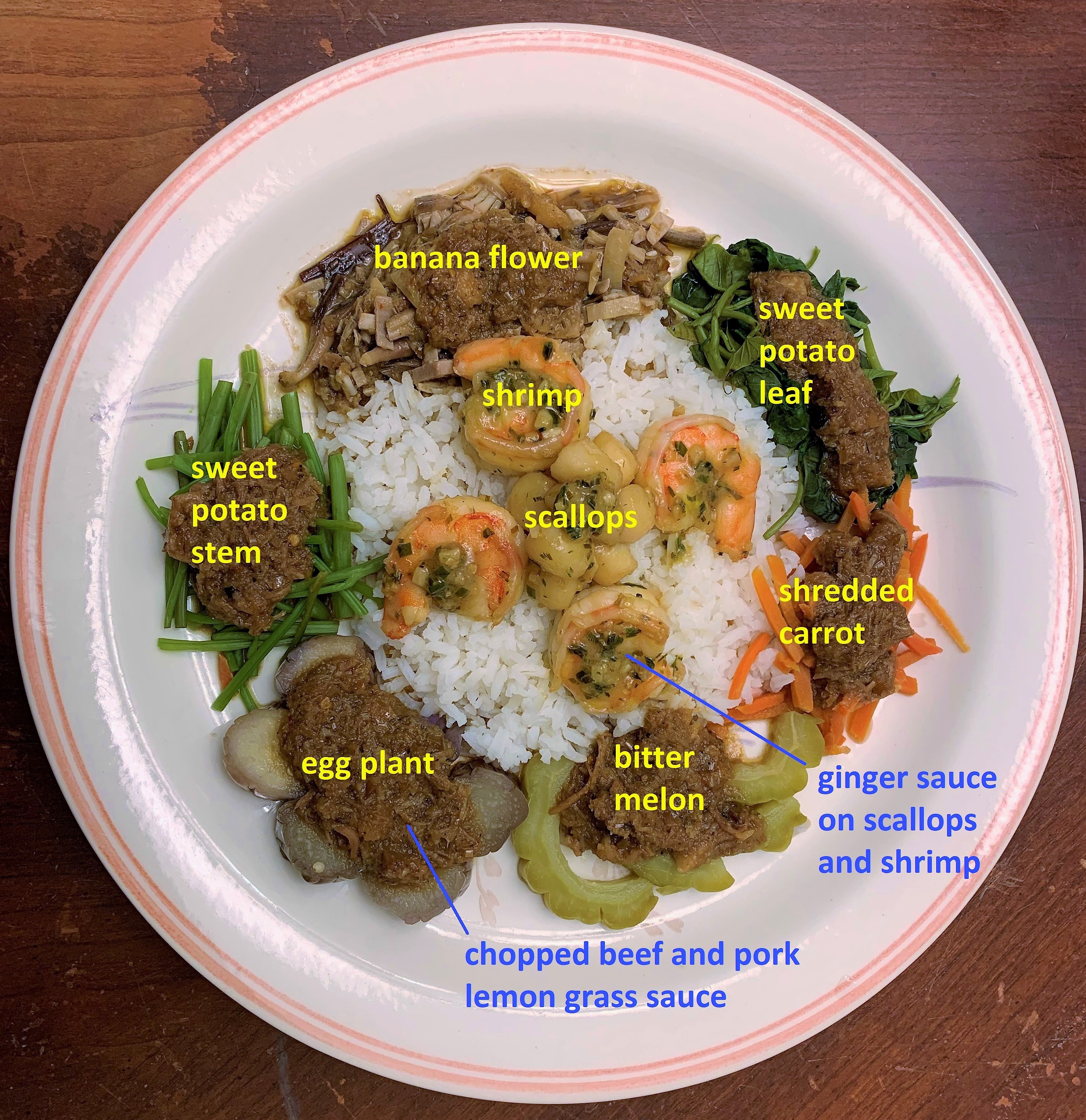
Kuluban (boiled vegetables) topped with Serundeng (chopped meat). Served room temperature.

== See also ==
- Lawar, a Balinese version of urap
- Gado-gado
- Karedok
- List of salads
- Pecel
- Urap
