= Urap =

Indonesian traditional salad dish

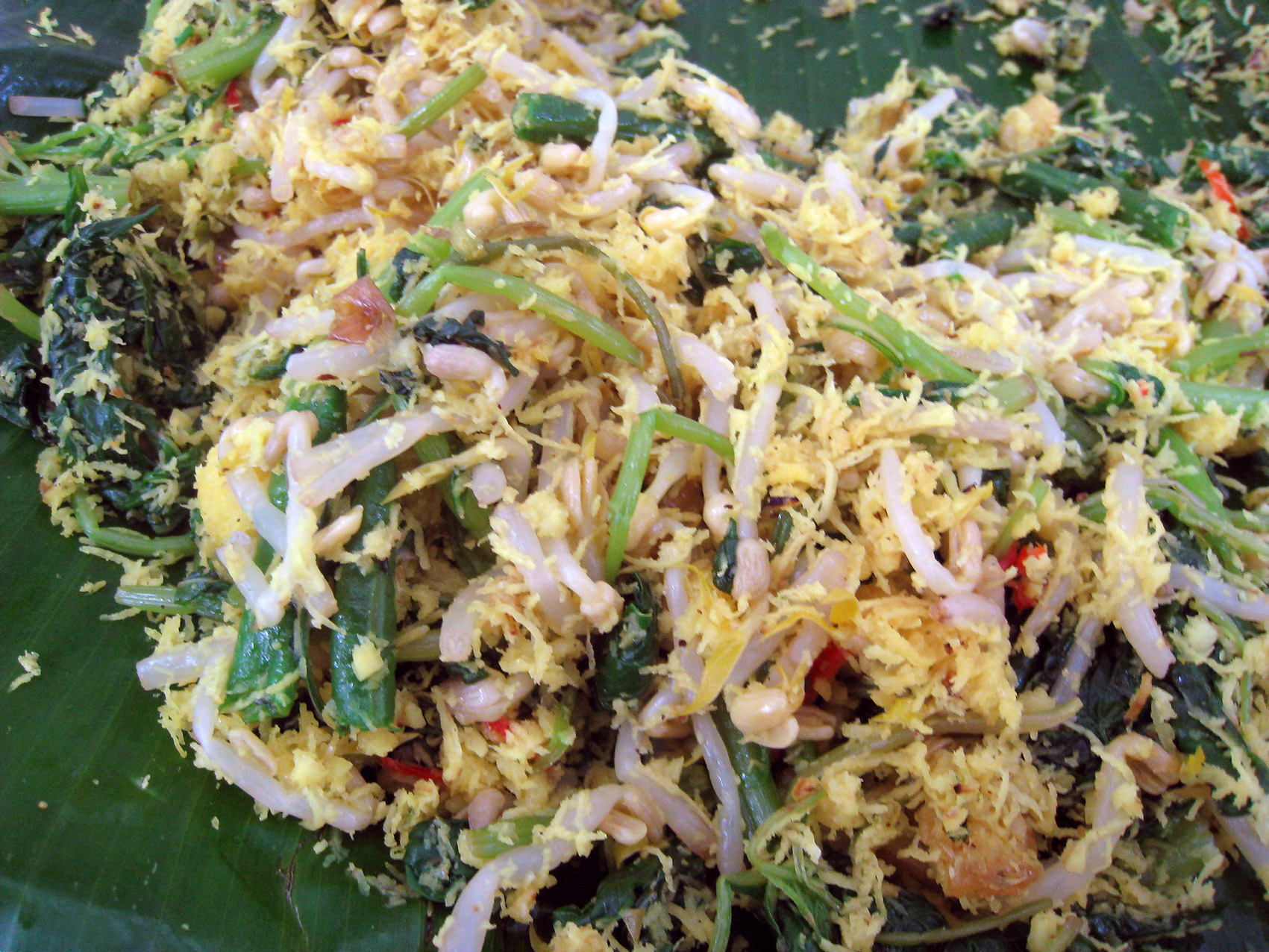
- Vegetable urap
- Alternative names: Urab, Urap-urap, krawu
- Course: Side dish
- Place of origin: Indonesia
- Region or state: Central Java and Yogyakarta
- Serving temperature: Mostly served with main course
- Main ingredients: Steamed vegetable salad, shredded coconut dressing

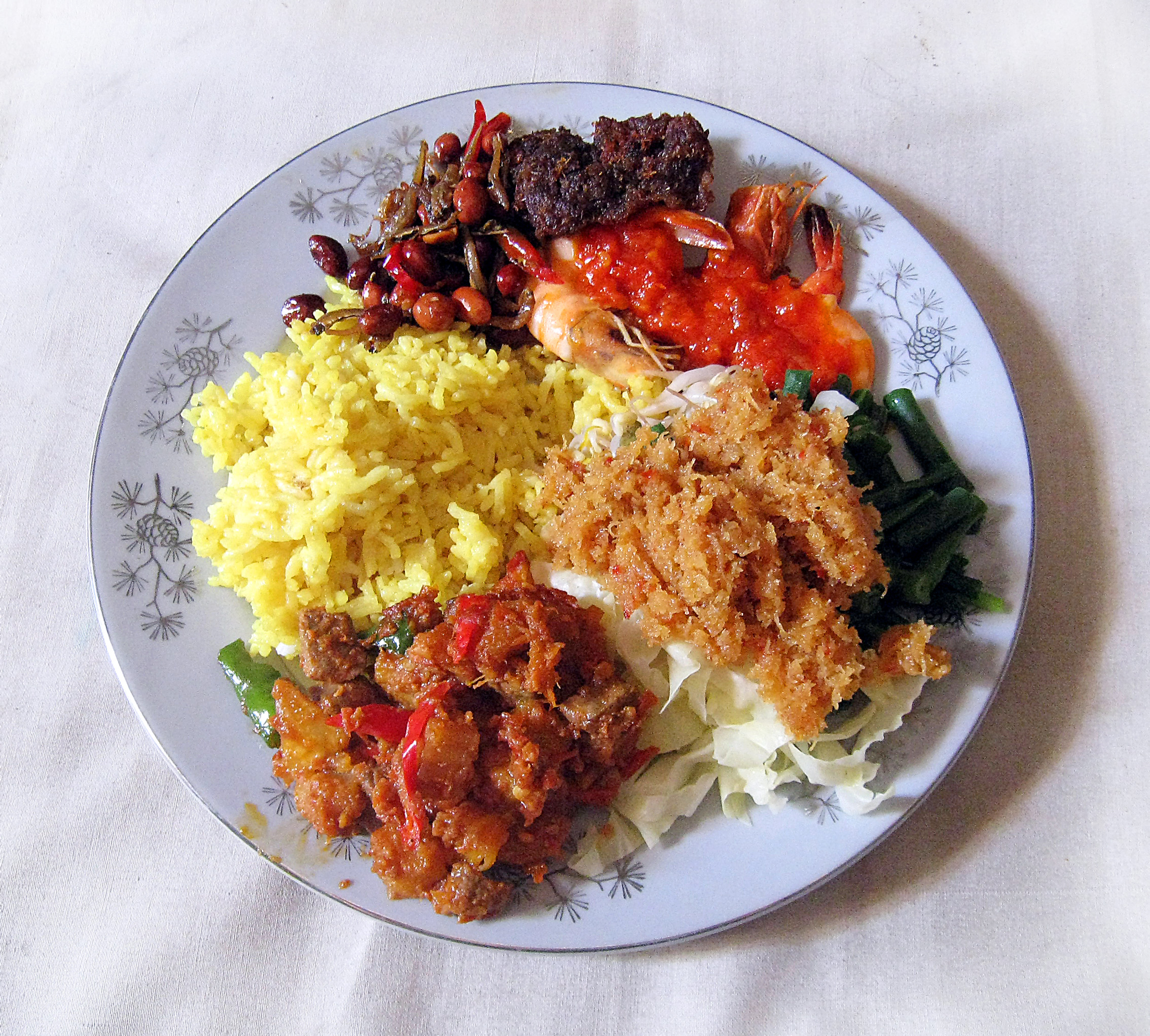
Urap (bottom right) as part of a nasi kuning dish.

Urap, oerap, krawu, urab or in its plural form urap-urap is a salad dish of steamed or boiled vegetables mixed with seasoned and spiced grated coconut for dressing. It is commonly found in Indonesian cuisine, more precisely Javanese cuisine. Urap can be consumed on its own as a salad for vegetarian meals or as a side dish. Urap is usually found as a prerequisite side dish of Javanese tumpeng, a cone-shaped rice mound surrounded with assorted dishes, as well as part of a nasi kuning dish. In Balinese cuisine, it is known as urab sayur.

== Ingredients ==
The vegetables which are usually used in urap are spinach, water spinach, young cassava leaf, papaya leaf, Chinese long beans, bean sprouts, and cabbage. To acquire a rich taste, most recipes insist on using freshly shredded old coconut flesh or serundeng, instead of leftovers. The shredded coconut is seasoned with ground shallot, garlic, red chili pepper, tamarind juice, galangal, salt, and coconut sugar.

== See also ==
- Lawar, a Balinese version of urap
- Gado-gado
- Karedok
- Pecel
- Plecing kangkung
- Kuluban
- List of steamed foods
