= Pynyonade =

English confection made with pine nuts

Pynyonade or pinionade was a type of confit or confection made with pine nuts and powder-douce in medieval England. Some historic recipes included honey, which may have made it similar to the modern nut brittle. It was imported to England from the Mediterranean in boxes along with other sweets like festucade, citrinade, pomade and gingerbread. There are surviving records showing Katherine de Norwich receiving boxes of pinionade in 1336. The etymology of the word is thought to derive either from the Catalan pinyonada or the Old Occitan pinhonat.

The Forme of Cury gives the recipe as:

Take Almandes iblanced and drawer hem sumdell thicke with gode broth...set on the fire and seeþ it...take Pynes yfryed in oyle oþer in greece and þerto white Powdour douce
