= Bumbu (seasoning) =

Indonesian spice blends

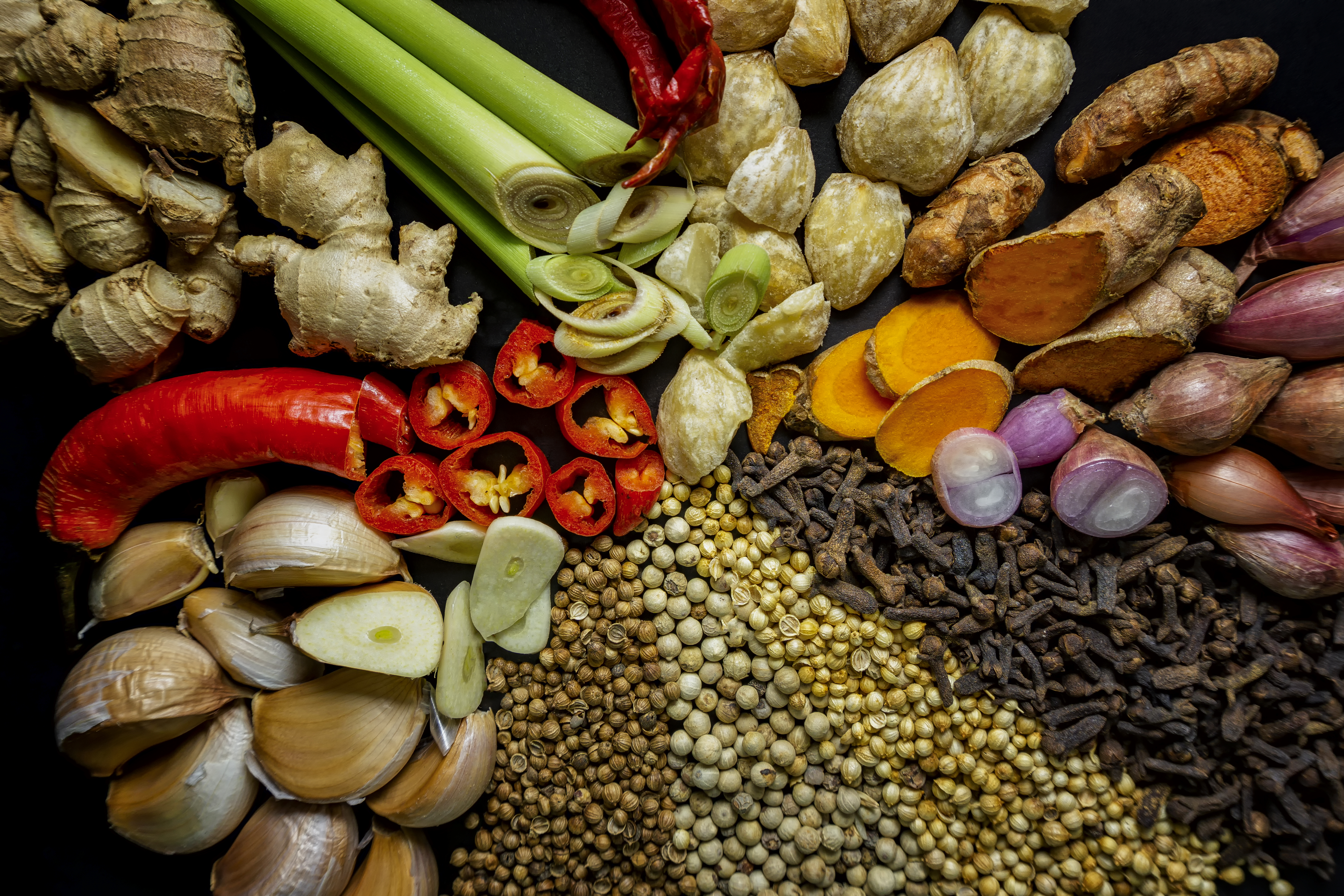
Multiple bumbu and spices commonly used in Indonesian cuisine.

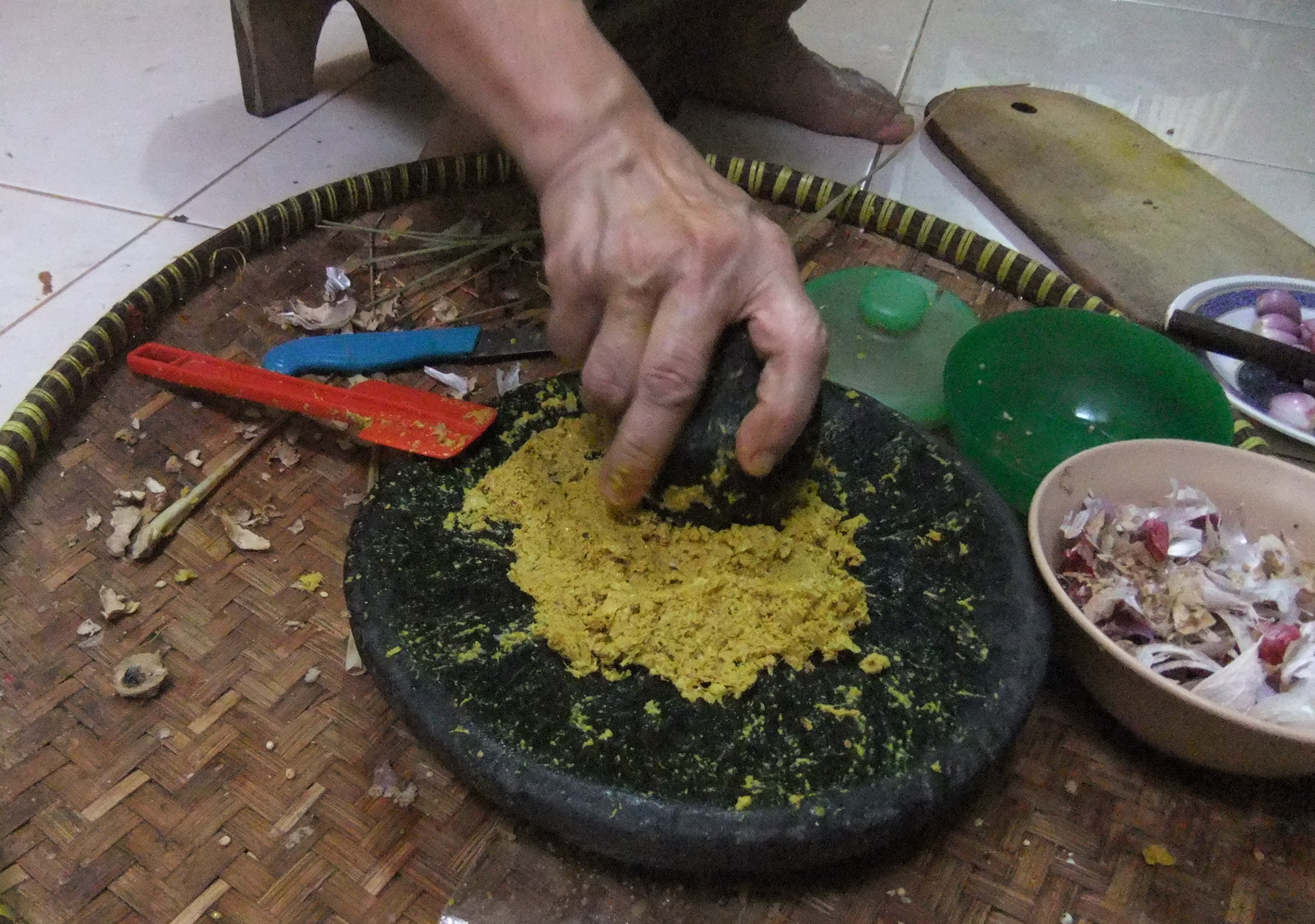
Multiple spices are traditionally stone-ground to create a bumbu.

Bumbu (Indonesian pronunciation: [ˈbumbu]) is the Indonesian word for a blend of spices and for pastes and it commonly appears in the names of spice mixtures, sauces and seasoning pastes. The official Indonesian language dictionary describes bumbu as "various types of herbs and plants that have a pleasant aroma and flavour — such as ginger, turmeric, galangal, nutmeg and pepper — used to enhance the flavour of the food."

It is a characteristic of Indonesian cuisine and its regional variants such as Balinese, Javanese, Sundanese, Padang, Batak and Manado cuisines. It is used with various meats, seafood and vegetables in stews, soups, barbecue, sotos, gulai, and also as an addition to Indonesian-style instant noodles.

Indonesians have developed original gastronomic themes with lemongrass and galangal, cardamom and chilies, tamarind and turmeric.

Unlike North Indian cooking tradition that favours dried spice powder mix, Indonesian cuisine is more akin to Thai, which favours the use of fresh ingredients. South and East Indian cuisines are also similar, as they likewise use fresh ingredients. Traditionally, this mixture of spices and other aromatic ingredients is freshly ground into a moist paste using a mortar and pestle.

The spice mixture is commonly made by slicing, chopping, grinding, beating, bruising, or sometimes dry-roasting the spices, using traditional cooking tools such as stone mortar and pestle, or a modern blender or food processor. The bumbu mixture is usually stir-fried in hot cooking oil first to release its aroma, prior to adding the main ingredient (usually meats, poultry, or fish).

The equivalent in the Malaysian cuisine is rempah.

== Function ==
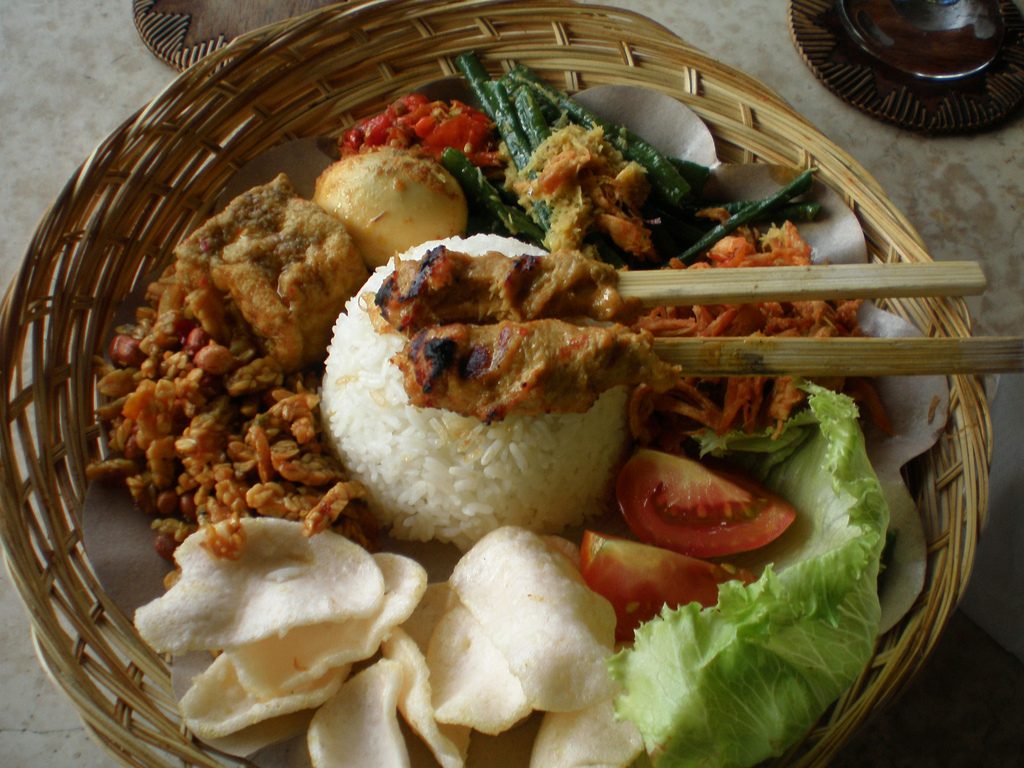
Indonesian dishes such as Balinese nasi campur are rich with bumbu (herbs, spices, and seasoning)

The main function of bumbu is to add flavour and aroma, but prior to the invention of refrigeration technology, spices were used as preservatives. Garlic, shallots, ginger and galangal have antimicrobial properties and serve as natural organic preservatives.

== Spices ==
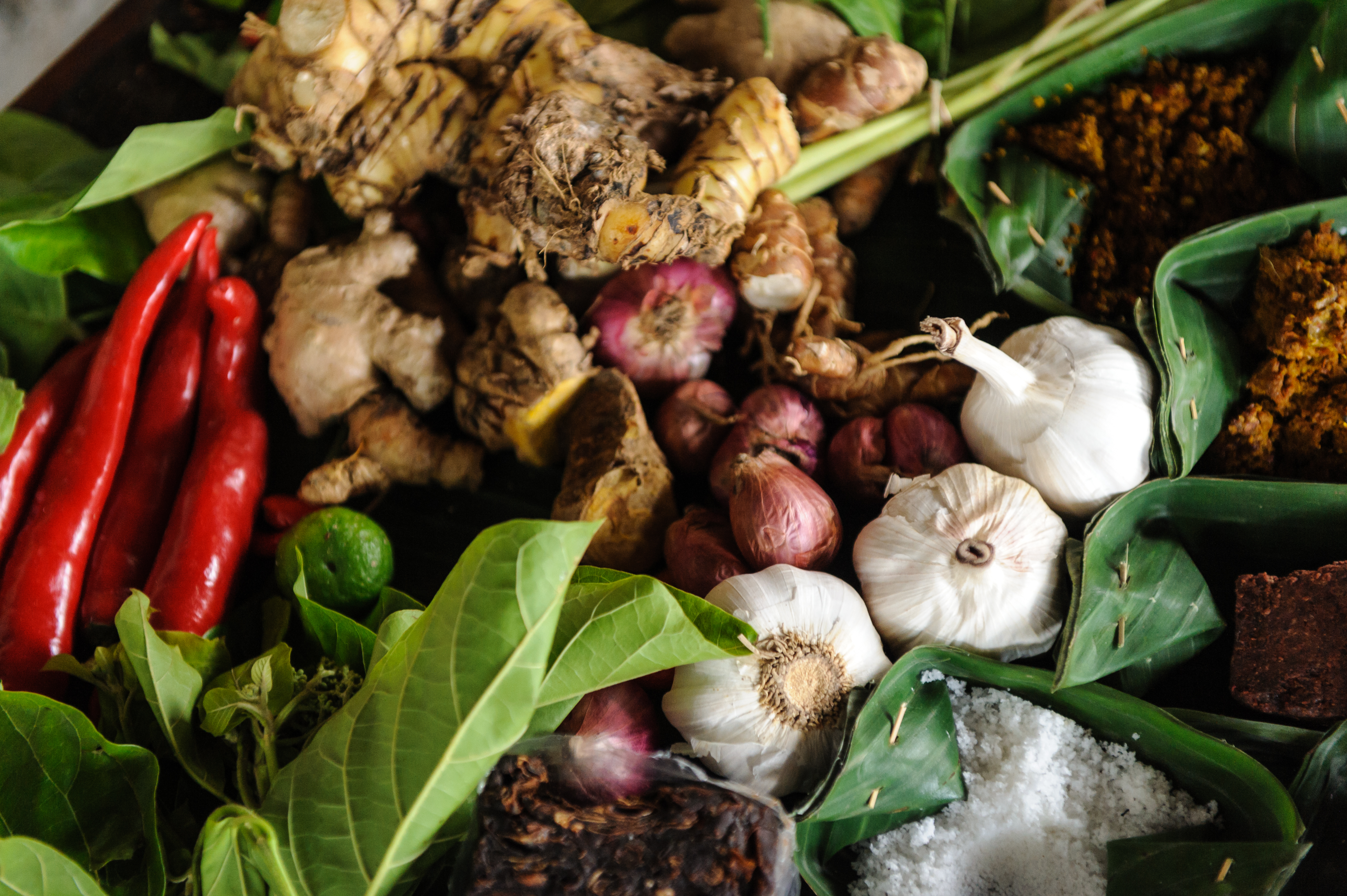
Various Indonesian spices

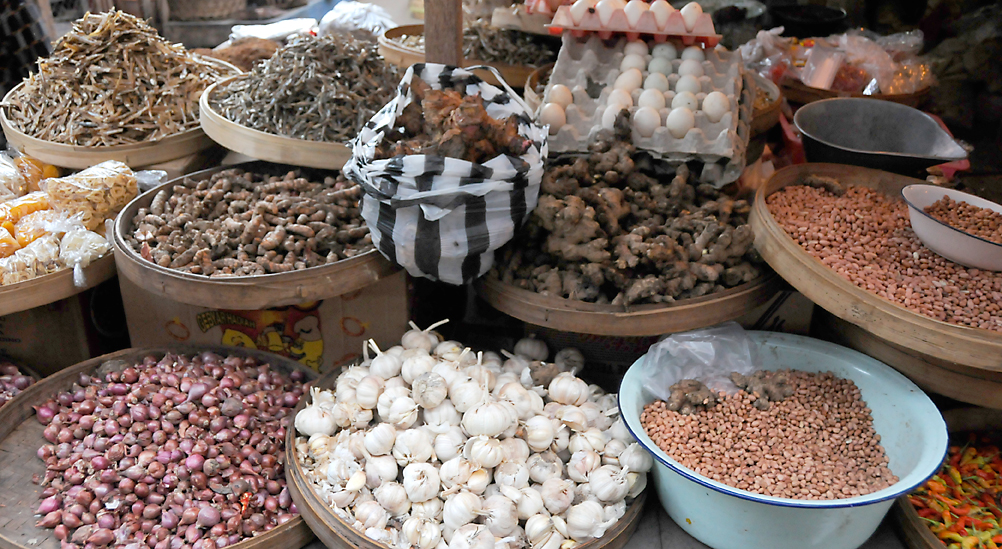
Various Indonesian spices sold in traditional marketplace

Known as the "Spice Islands", the Indonesian islands of Maluku contributed to the introduction of its native spices to world cuisine. Spices such as pala (nutmeg/mace), cengkih (clove), daun pandan (Pandan leaves), kemiri (candlenut), keluak (Pangium edule), serai (lemongrass), and lengkuas (galangal) are native to Indonesia. It is likely that lada hitam (black pepper), kunyit (turmeric), daun kari (curry leaf), bawang merah (shallot), kayu manis (cinnamon), ketumbar (coriander), jahe (ginger) and asam jawa (tamarind) were introduced from India or mainland Southeast Asia, while daun bawang (scallions) and bawang putih (garlic) were introduced from China. Those spices from mainland Asia were introduced early, in ancient times, thus they became integral ingredients in Indonesian cuisine. While the New World spices such as chili pepper and tomato were introduced by Portuguese and Spanish traders during the Age of Exploration in the 16th century. List of spices used in bumbu are:

- Adas manis (anise)
- Andaliman (sichuan pepper)
- Asam jawa (tamarind)
- Bawang bombai (onion)
- Bawang merah (shallot)
- Bawang perei (leek)
- Bawang putih (garlic)
- Bunga lawang (star anise)
- Bunga pala (mace)
- Cabai rawit (bird's eye chillies)
- Cabai merah (red chilli pepper)
- Cabai jawa (Javanese chilli pepper)
- Cengkih (clove)
- Daun bawang (scallion)
- Daun jeruk (lime leaf)
- Daun kari or salam koja (curry leaf)
- Daun kemangi (basil)
- Daun pandan (Pandan leaf)
- Daun salam (Indonesian bay leaf)
- Jahe (ginger)
- Jeruk purut (kaffir lime)
- Jeruk nipis (key lime)
- Jintan (caraway)
- Kepulaga (cardamom)
- Kayu manis (cinnamon)
- Kecombrang (wild ginger)
- Kencur (Kaempferia galanga)
- Kemiri (candlenut)
- Ketumbar (coriander)
- Keluak or kluwek (Pangium edule)
- Kunyit or kunir (turmeric)
- Lengkuas or laos (galangal)
- Lada hitam (black pepper)
- Lada putih (white pepper)
- Lokio (chives)
- Pala (nutmeg)
- Peterseli (parsley)
- Seledri (celery)
- Serai (lemongrass)
- Temu kunci (Chinese keys)
- Temu lawak (curcuma)

== Seasonings ==
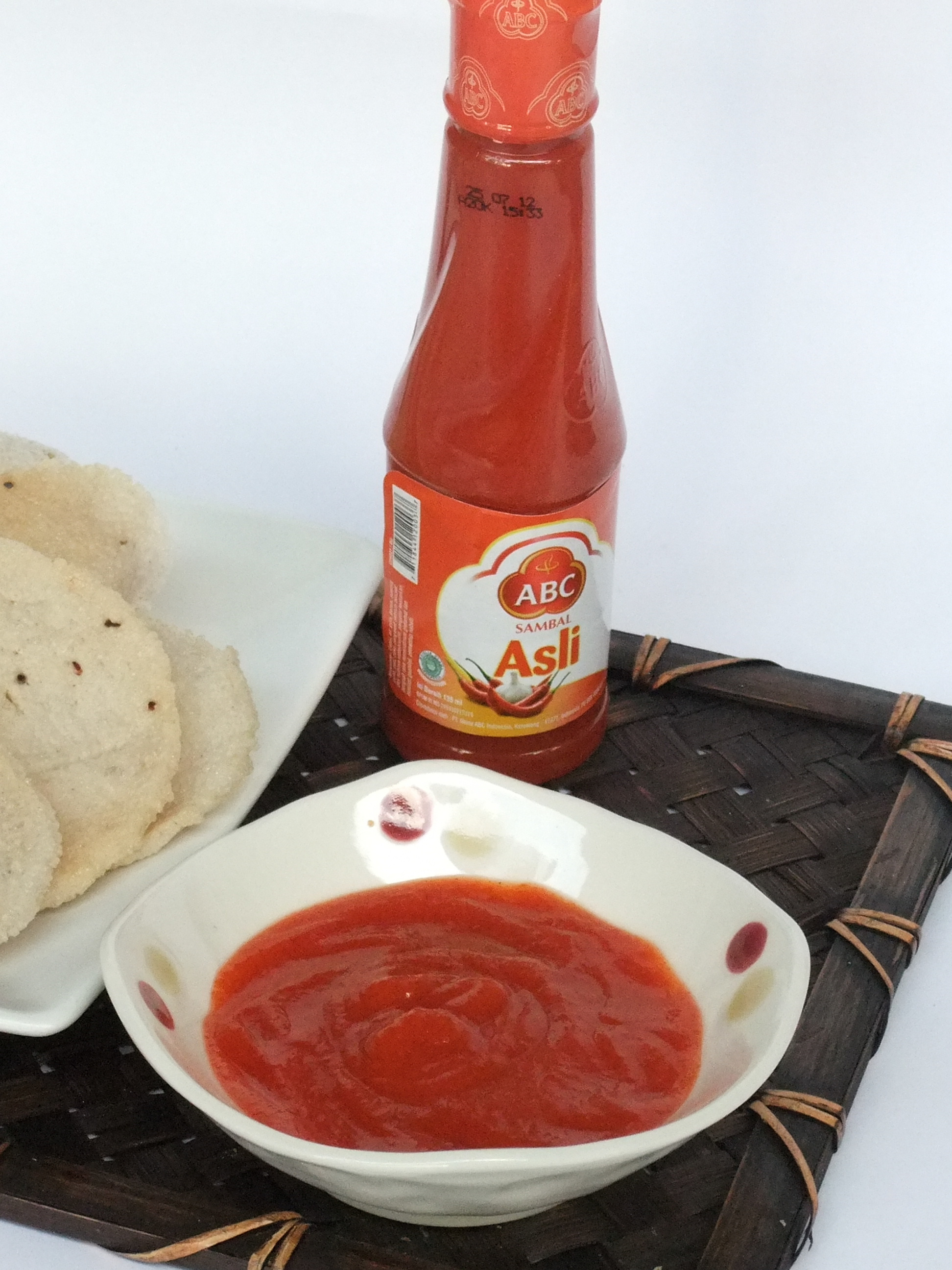
Bottled saus sambal (hot chili sauce)

Indonesian cuisine also recognize various types of sauces, condiments and seasonings, some are basic seasonings, some are indigenously developed, while another was influenced by Indian, Chinese and European sauces, such as:

- Garam (salt)
- Gula merah or gula jawa (palm sugar)
- Cuka (vinegar)
- Kecap manis (sweet soy sauce)
- Kecap asin (salty or common soy sauce)
- Kecap ikan (fish sauce)
- Kecap inggris (Worcestershire sauce)
- Minyak kelapa (coconut oil)
- Minyak samin (ghee)
- Minyak wijen (sesame oil)
- Minyak zaitun (olive oil)
- Saus tomat (tomato ketchup)
- Saus cabai or sambal botol (bottled sambal or hot chili sauce)
- Saus tiram (oyster sauce)
- Santan (coconut milk)
- Kacang tanah (peanuts), fried, grounded, spiced and add water to make peanut sauce. Prepacked ready to use (just add water) satay, pecel or gado-gado peanut sauces are available in Asian grocery store.
- Terasi or belacan (shrimp paste)
- Petis (a type of shrimp paste)
- Tauco (fermented soy paste)
- Ang ciu (Chinese cooking red wine)
- Bubuk kaldu (broth powder), similar to bouillon cube but in granular powder.
- Vetsin (Monosodium glutamate)

Recently there are some additional foreign sauces and seasonings that has been included into Indonesian kitchen and sometimes used as condiment, such as:

- Mayones (mayonnaise)
- Moster (mustard)
- Saus barbekyu (barbecue sauce)
- Saus teriyaki (teriyaki sauce)

== Basic bumbu ==
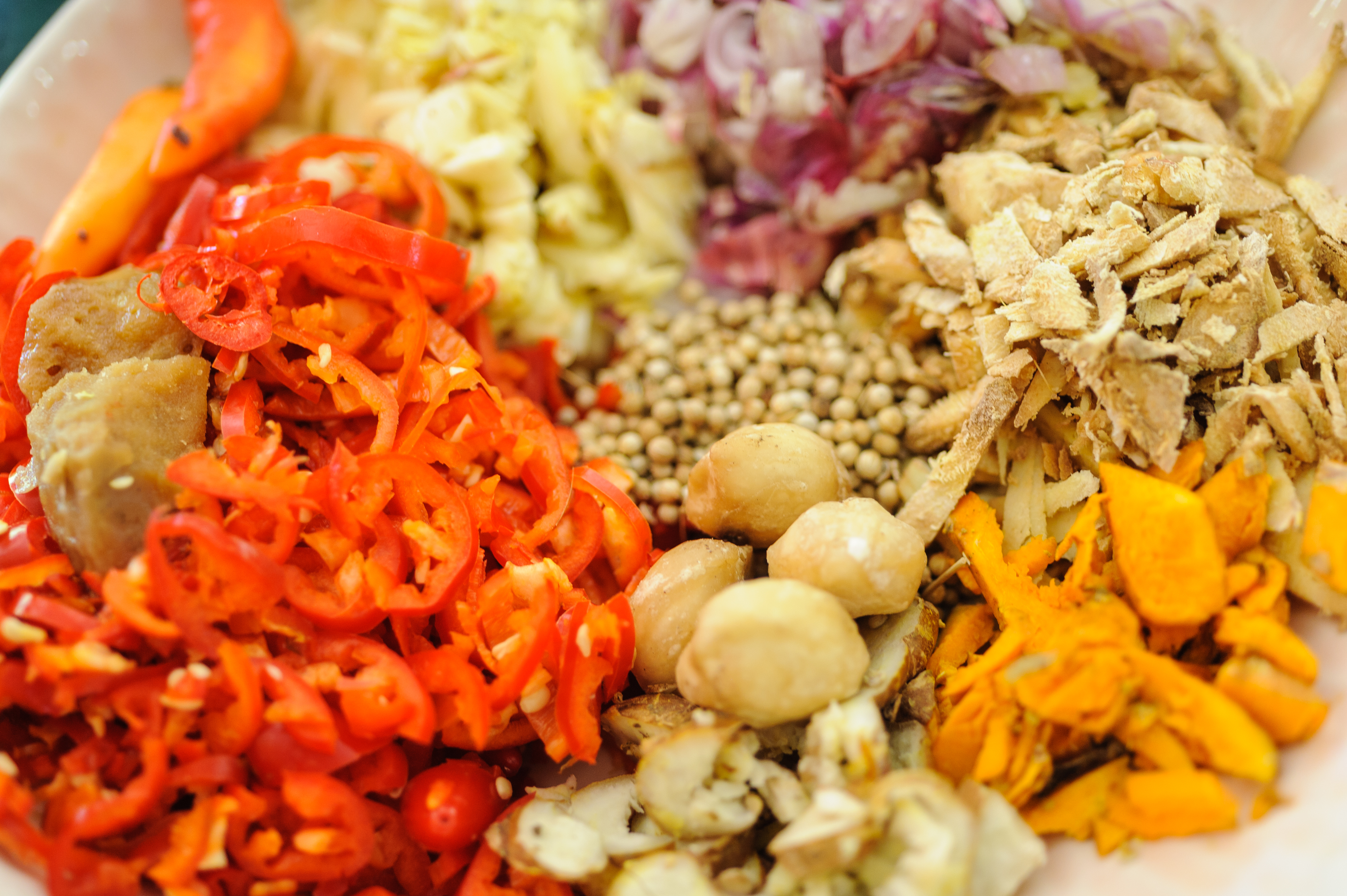
Some basic ingredients of Indonesian bumbu

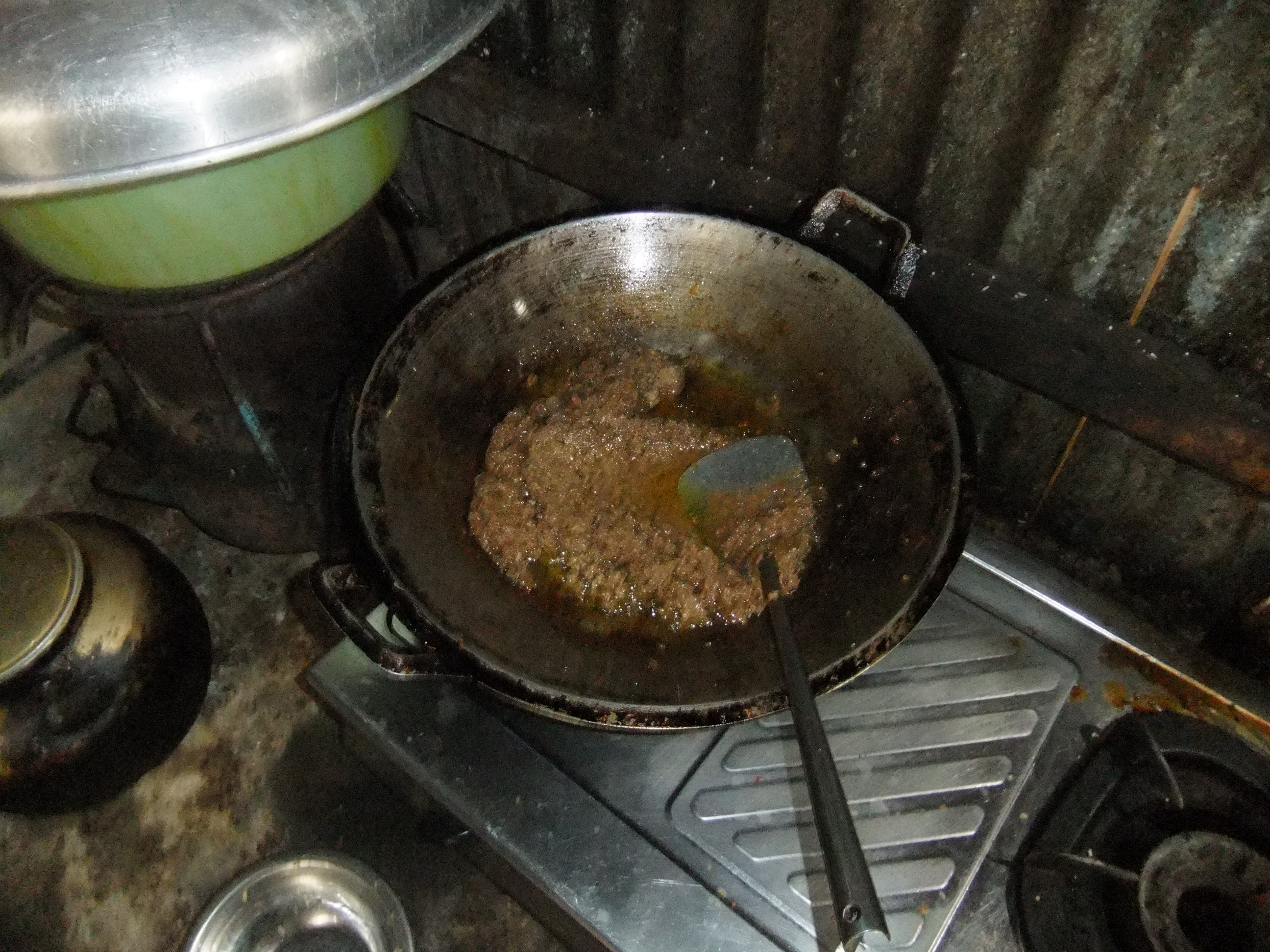
Bumbu paste is usually stir-fried in coconut oil to release its aroma

In Indonesian cuisine there are many variations of bumbu spice mixtures, varying based on individual recipes and regional cuisine traditions. For example, Balinese cuisine includes basa genep bumbu, while Minang cuisine includes pemasak bumbu. However, there are four generic basic bumbu generally recognized in broader Indonesian cuisine and identified by color. These generally consist of a mixture of spices stir-fried in coconut oil, which can be used fresh or stored under refrigeration for later use.

1. Bumbu dasar putih (basic white bumbu) consists of ground shallot, garlic, galangal, candlenut and coriander. It is generally used in whitish-colored Indonesian meal, such as opor ayam, sayur lodeh, and many kinds of soto. Indonesian bay leaf, lemon leaf, and lemongrass can occasionally be used to enhance the flavor of those dishes. Bumbu dasar putih can also be used to prepare rawon, semur, mie goreng, various stir fried vegetables, tofu, and tempeh dishes.
2. Bumbu dasar merah (basic red bumbu) consists of ground red chili pepper, shallot, garlic, tomato, roasted shrimp paste, coconut sugar, and salt. It can be used for various Indonesian dishes that have reddish color such as various stir-fried vegetables, nasi goreng, and sambal goreng hati, with the addition daun salam (Indonesian bay leaf), bruised lemongrass and galangal.
3. Bumbu dasar kuning (basic yellow bumbu) consists of ground shallot, garlic, sauteed candlenut, roasted turmeric, coriander, ginger, galangal, and black pepper. It is used in various Indonesian dishes that have a yellowish color, such as various soto, pepes, mie goreng and ayam goreng. Sometimes a pickled acar version can be used to top ikan bakar or ikan goreng.
4. Bumbu dasar jingga/oranye (basic orange-colored bumbu) consists of ground red chili pepper, shallot, garlic, caraway, anise, coriander, candlenut, turmeric, ginger, galangal, and black pepper. It is used in various orange-colored Indonesian dishes, such as gulai, Indonesian curry, kalio and rendang.

== See also ==
- Cuisine of Indonesia
- List of Indonesian condiments
- Balado
- Bumbu kacang
- Curry paste
- Kroeung, a Cambodian equivalent
- Rica-rica
- Sambal

Media related to Bumbu (spice mixture) at Wikimedia Commons The dictionary definition of bumbu at Wiktionary
