= Lawar (food) =

Indonesian meat and vegetable dish

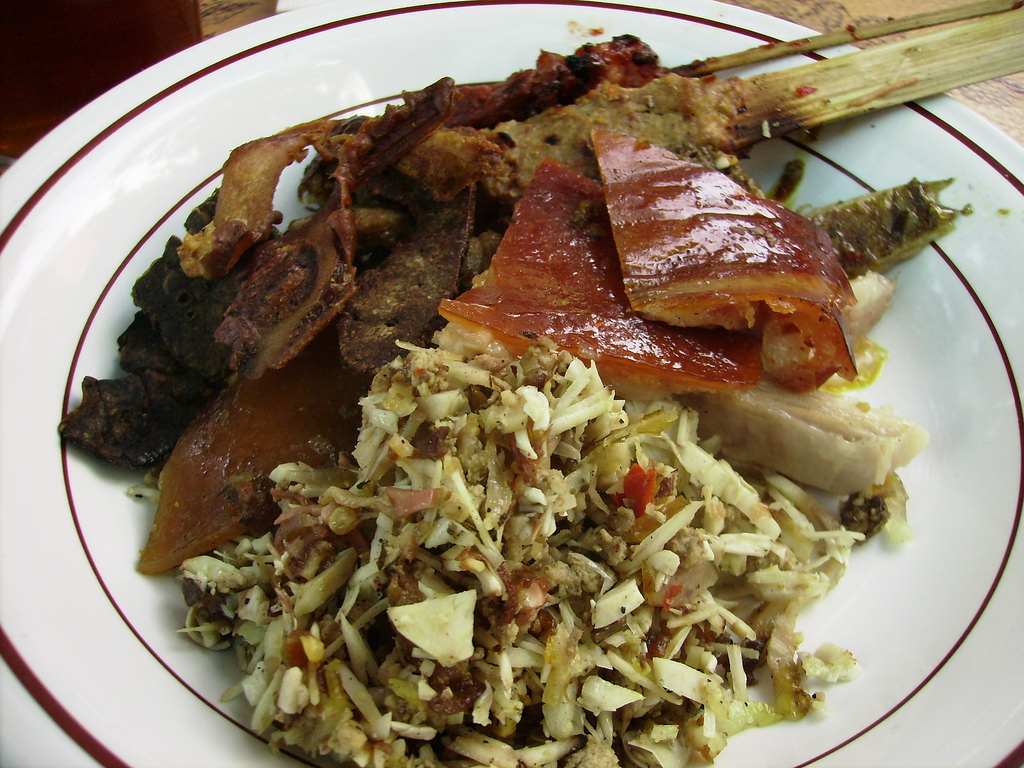
- Lawar with pig roast
- Course: Main course
- Place of origin: Indonesia
- Region or state: Bali
- Serving temperature: Room temperature
- Main ingredients: Various vegetables and coconut with herbs and spices

Lawar (Balinese: ᬮᬯᬃ) is an Indonesian dish created from a mixture of vegetables, coconut, and minced meat mixed with rich herbs and spices, originating from Bali, Indonesia. This dish is commonly found in restaurants and warungs in Bali. Despite its rich vegetable mixture, lawar is not a vegetarian dish, since most often it is mixed with minced meat or even blood.

== Ingredients ==
Lawar consists of green beans, beaten eggs, vegetable oil, kaffir lime leaves, coconut milk, palm sugar, freshly grated coconut, and fried shallots, all stir-fried in coconut oil. Lawar is named according to its additional protein ingredients, for example, lawar with chicken is called chicken lawar, lawar mixed with pork is called pork lawar. Lawar which uses young jackfruit is called jackfruit lawar.

Some types of lawar might add the blood of butchered animals (usually pork or chicken blood) mixed with spices to add taste. Because of its rich protein and fat content acquired from coconut milk and perhaps blood, lawar spoils easily and it should be consumed immediately; it is usually good for half a day before going bad. Sometimes lawar is named according to its color: lawar merah (red lawar) refers to its blood content, and lawar putih (white lawar) is only coconut without any blood. Lawar padamare is the type of combination of several types of lawars. Lawar is served with steamed rice and other meat dish such as babi guling (roasted suckling pork).

== See also ==
- Urap a Javanese version similar to lawar
- Gado-gado
- Karedok
- Pecel
