= Stir-fried water spinach =

Asian vegetable dish

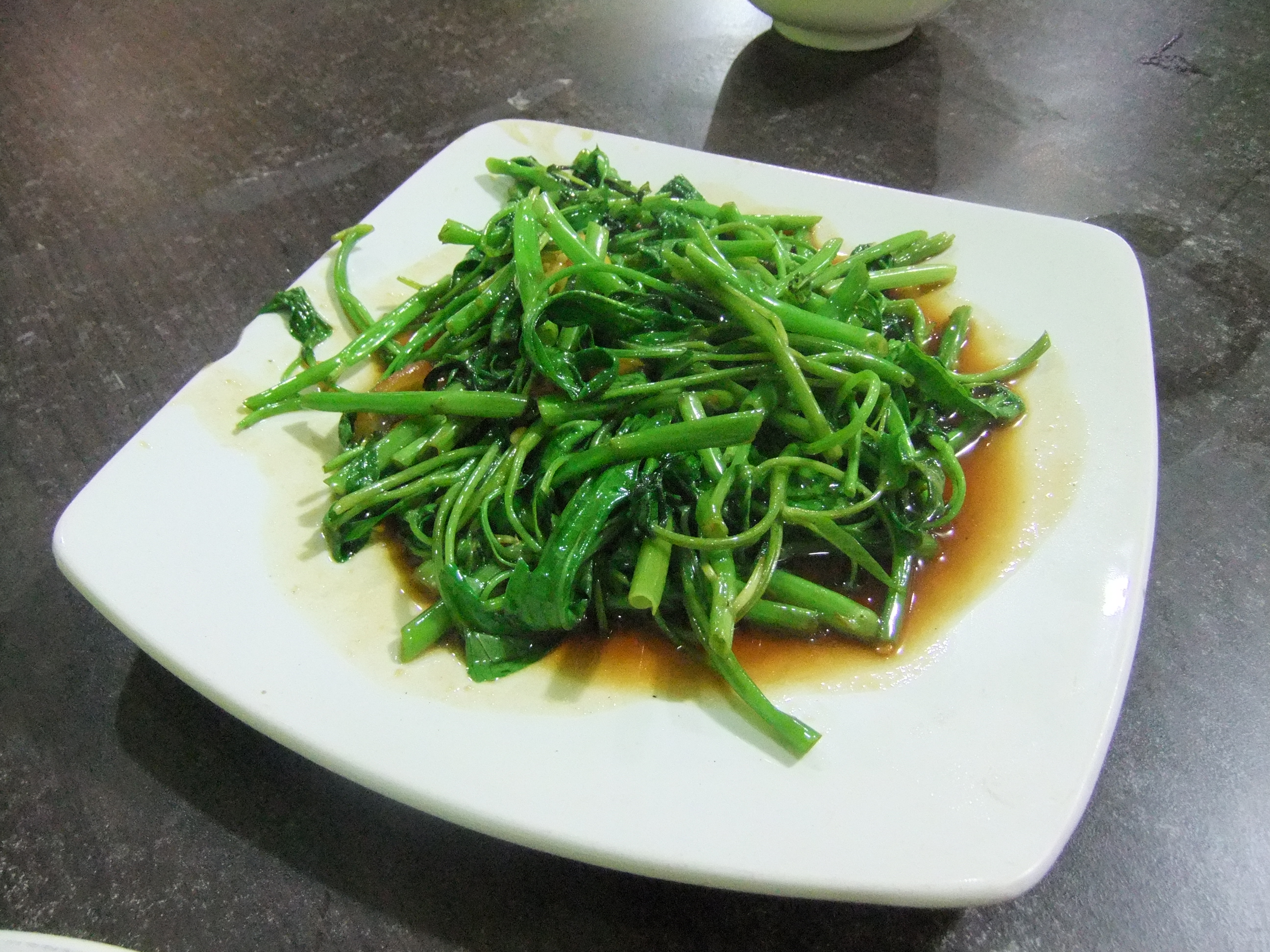
- Tumis kangkung served in Makassar, Indonesia
- Course: Side dish
- Region or state: East Asia: Southern China Southeast Asia: Cambodia, Indonesia, Malaysia, Myanmar, Philippines, Singapore, Thailand, Vietnam South Asia: Sri Lanka, Bangladesh and Eastern India
- Serving temperature: hot
- Main ingredients: water spinach

Stir-fried water spinach is a common Asian vegetable dish, known by various names in Asian languages. Water spinach (Ipomoea aquatica) is stir-fried with a variety of vegetables and spices. It is commonly found throughout East, South and Southeast Asia: from Sichuan and Cantonese cuisine in China, to Indonesian, Burmese, Cambodian, Filipino, Malaysian, Singaporean, Taiwanese, and Vietnamese cuisine; to Sri Lankan cuisine and Bengali cuisine in South Asia.

== Dish names ==
The dish is known by many names including tumis kangkung or cah kangkung in Indonesia; kangkong goreng in Malaysia; ginisang kangkóng or adobong kangkóng in the Philippines; pad pakboong (ผัดผักบุ้ง) in Thai; rau muống xào in Vietnam; stir-fried kong xin cai (空心菜) in Mandarin (China); stir-fried tung choy or ong choy (通菜) in Cantonese (China); tror koun cha (ត្រកួនឆា) in Khmer (Cambodia); gazun ywet kyaw (ကန်စွန်းရွက်ကြော် ) in Burmese, kankun mallung in Sri Lanka; kolmi shak bhaja in Bangladesh and eastern India.

- Burmese: ကန်စွန်းရွက်ကြော်, romanized: găzun ywet kyaw
- Chinese: 炒空心菜; pinyin: chǎo kōngxīncài
- Indonesian: kangkung tumis, cah kangkung
- Javanese: osèng kangkung
- Khmer: ឆាត្រកួន, romanized: chaa trakuon
- Lao: ຂົ້ວຜັກບົ້ງ, romanized: khūa phak bong
- Malay: kangkung goreng, Malay: kangkung tumis
- Min Nan Chinese: 炒蕹菜; Pe̍h-ōe-jī: chhá èng-chhài
- Tagalog: ginisang kangkong, adobong kangkong
- Thai: ผัดผักบุ้ง, romanized: phat phak bung
- Vietnamese: rau muống xào
- Yue Chinese: 炒通菜; Jyutping: caau2 tung1 coi3

== Cooking method ==
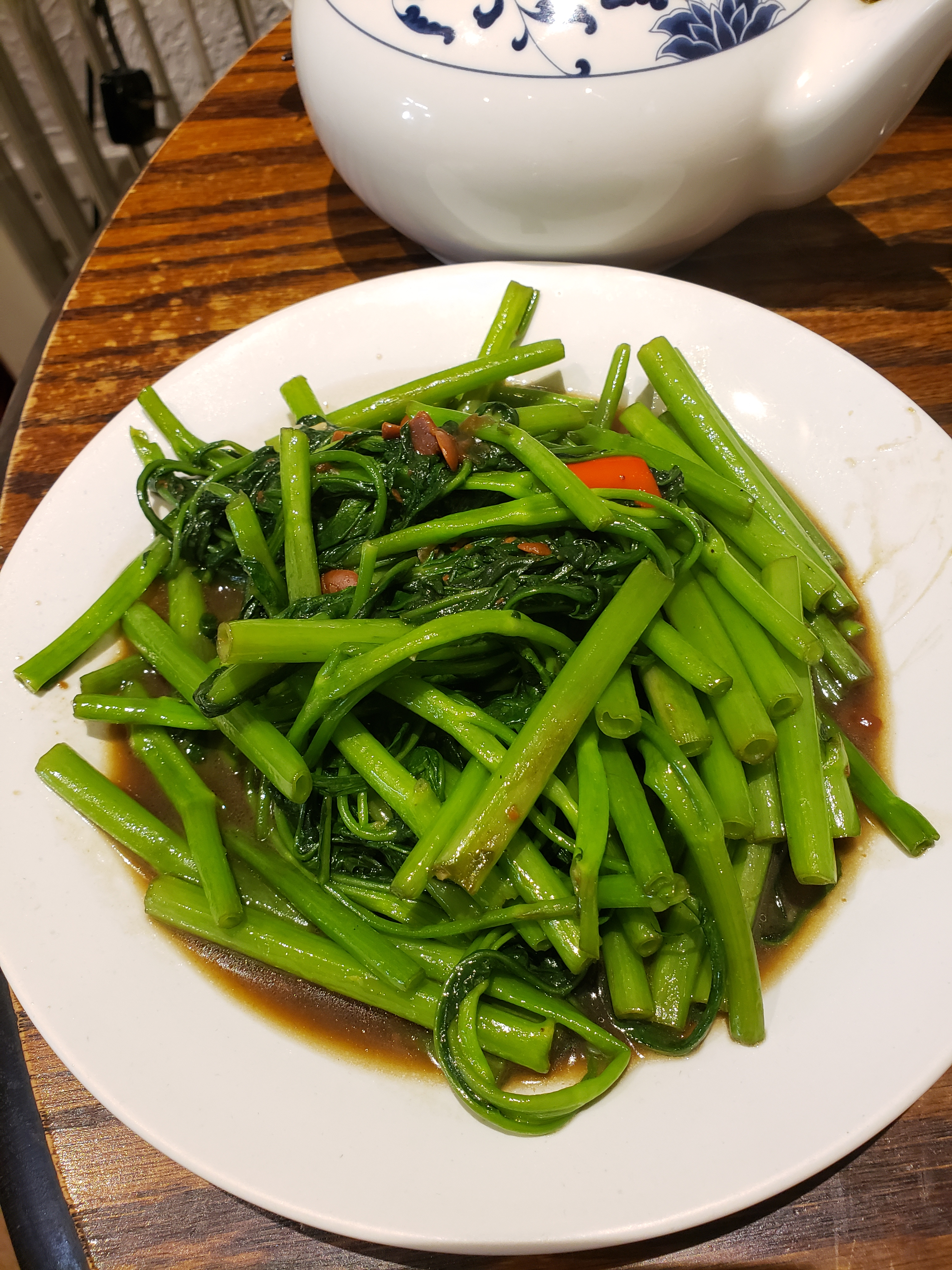
Thai style

Stir-fried water spinach is one of the simplest, easiest, and also cheapest vegetable dishes in Asia, which contributes to its popularity. Water spinach thrives in the waterways, rivers, lakes and swamps of tropical Southeast Asia and Southern China. The garlic and shallots or onion are stir-fried in cooking oil, then the cleaned and cut water spinach are added, stir-fried in a wok on a strong heat source with a small amount of cooking oil. The stir-frying lightly caramelises the vegetables. The seasoning sauce is added according to each preference and recipe. Some might add slices of red hot chili pepper for spicy tanginess, while fresh or dried shrimp might be added for flavour. Other recipes might add diced tofu.

== Seasonings and variations ==
Stir-fried water spinach might vary according to its seasonings. A stir-fried water spinach dish could be lightly seasoned in garlic, black pepper, fish sauce, soy sauce, oyster sauce, or in spicy chili pepper, tauco (fermented soybean paste), shrimp paste or other sauce.

The Vietnamese version uses either fish sauce or oyster sauce for seasoning, while the Indonesian and Malaysian versions seem to favour shrimp paste. The Filipino version often uses a soy sauce-vinegar seasoning mix, reminiscent of Philippine adobo seasoning, with versions that also use shrimp paste, fish sauce, or fermented fish. The Southern Chinese recipe might favour oyster sauce or fermented tofu (腐乳) seasoning. In West Java, the Chinese Indonesian version favours the use of tauco fermented soybean paste as seasoning. In Burmese cuisine, stir-fried water spinach is typically fried with diced mushrooms, garlic, onions, and fresh chilies, and seasoned with oyster sauce, chicken stock, sesame oil, and salt.

=== Water spinach with shrimp paste ===
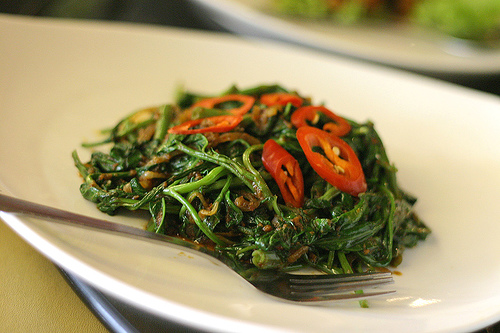
Kangkung belacan

A specific preparation of water spinach stir-fried with shrimp paste (belacan in Malay; terasi in Indonesian; and bagoong alamang in Filipino) is called kangkung belacan or kangkong belacan in Malaysia and Singapore, cah kangkung terasi in Indonesia, and binagoongang kangkóng in the Philippines. It is a well-known vegetable dish in Maritime Southeast Asia. In the Philippines, the shrimp paste can be replaced with bagoong isda (fermented fish) or patis (fish sauce) and is commonly served with deep-fried pork belly (lechon kawali).

== See also ==
- Binagoongan
- Crispy kangkóng
- Mallung
- Mie kangkung
- Plecing kangkung
