= Mallung =

Sri Lankan vegetable condiment or salad

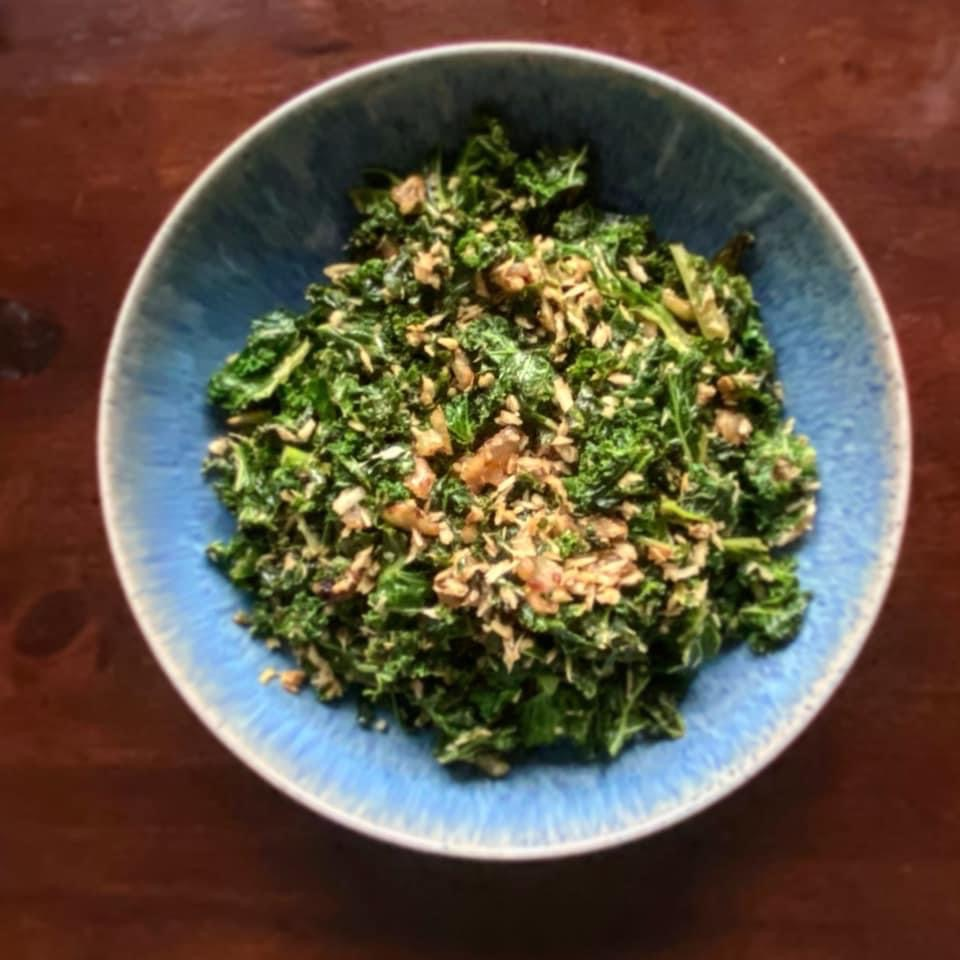
- Alternative names: Mallum, Mallem
- Course: Side dish
- Place of origin: Sri Lanka
- Associated cuisine: Sri Lankan cuisine
- Main ingredients: Leafy greens, grated coconut
- Ingredients generally used: Onion, chili, spices, Maldives fish

Mallung or mallum (Sinhala: මැල්ලුම්), is a shredded vegetable Sri Lankan dish that comprises lightly cooked/sautéed greens, with fresh coconut and any number of spices and chili. Mallung is a common condiment and is eaten at almost every meal. Meals are often served with one or two different mallungs, which play an important part in nutrition as this is how locals maintain a regular vitamin intake in their diet. The word 'mallung' or 'mallum' simply means 'wilted'.

The central ingredient of mallung is a leafy green vegetable, finely shredded and combined with a standard set of ingredients to enhance and support their flavour. Different plants are used to make mallung including cassia, passionfruit leaves, watercress, or water spinach leaves. In western countries leafy vegetables such as spinach, cabbage, chard, and kale are used as substitutes for traditional Sri Lankan greens. Additional ingredients include chopped green chillies, chopped shallots, chopped curry leaves, crushed garlic, a chopped clove of garlic together with half a cup of shredded coconut for every kilogram of moist leafy greens, seasoned with turmeric, salt and pepper, powdered Maldives fish, and lime juice.

A range of bitter, medicinal, and wild greens are commonly chosen for mallung in Sri Lanka, mostly using the leaves of native plants. One of the most popular mallungs is made with gotukola (Centella asiatica). Other popular varieties include kankun (Ipomoea aquatica), kathurumurunga (Sesbania grandiflora), and mukunuwenna (Alternanthera sessilis). Herbal leaves such as aguna (Wattakaka volubilis), Cheilocostus speciosus, and passionfruit leaves are also used in mallungs.
