= Crispy kangkóng =

Filipino appetizer

Crispy kangkong
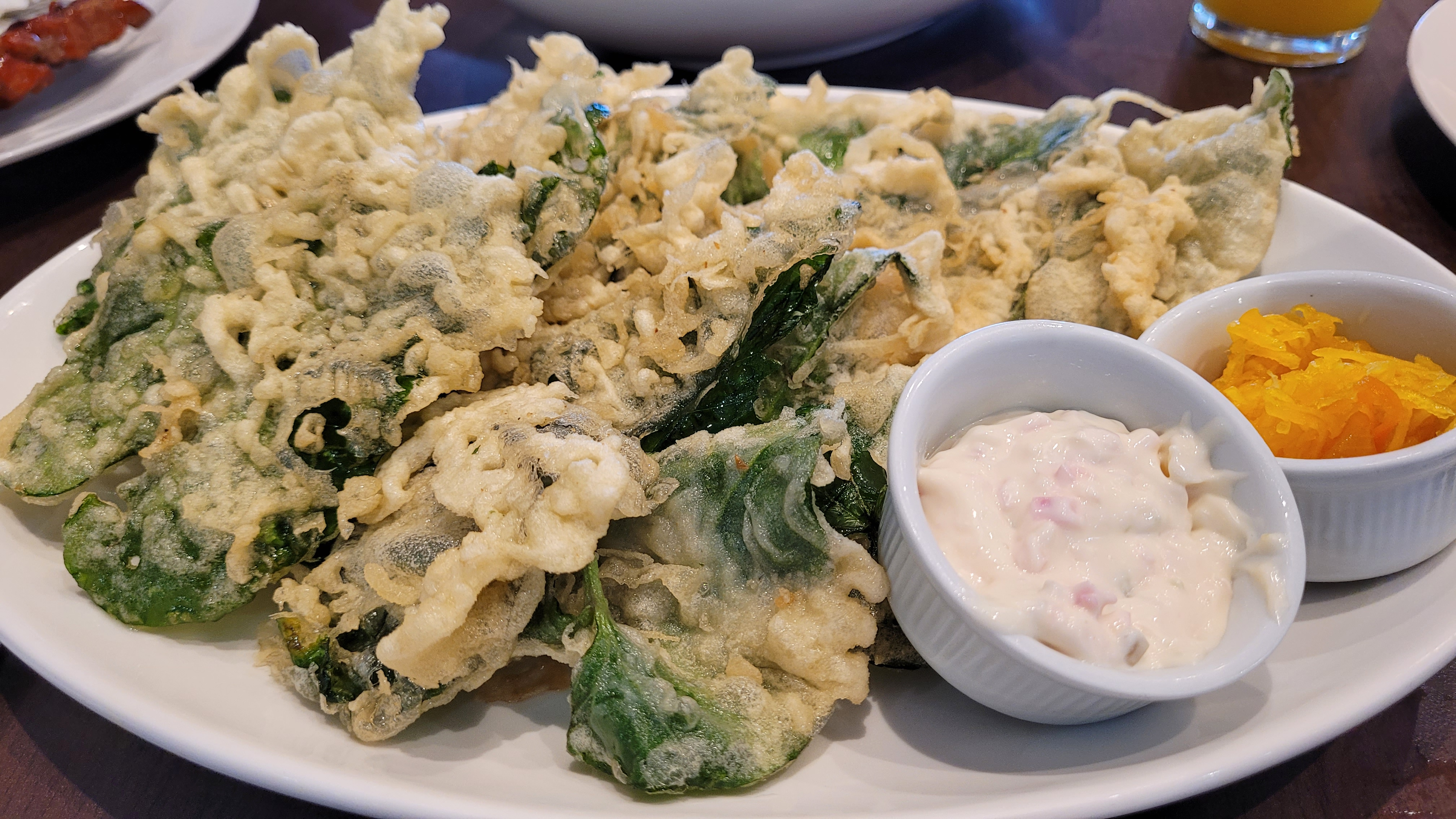
- Alternative names: Kangkong chips
- Course: Appetizer
- Place of origin: Philippines
- Main ingredients: Water spinach leaves, egg, flour
- Variations: Crispy kamote leaves

Crispy kangkong, also called kangkong chips, is a crispy deep-fried Filipino appetizer made with water spinach (kangkong) leaves coated with an egg and flour batter. It is eaten dipped in various sawsawan dipping sauces or mayonnaise. A vegetarian or vegan version of the dish can also be made by removing the egg component.

A variant of the dish is crispy kamote leaves, made with the young edible leaves (talbos ng kamote) of the related sweet potato.

== See also ==
- Kakiage
- Okoy
- Stir-fried water spinach
- Yasai tempura
