= Plecing kangkung =

Indonesian spicy water spinach dish

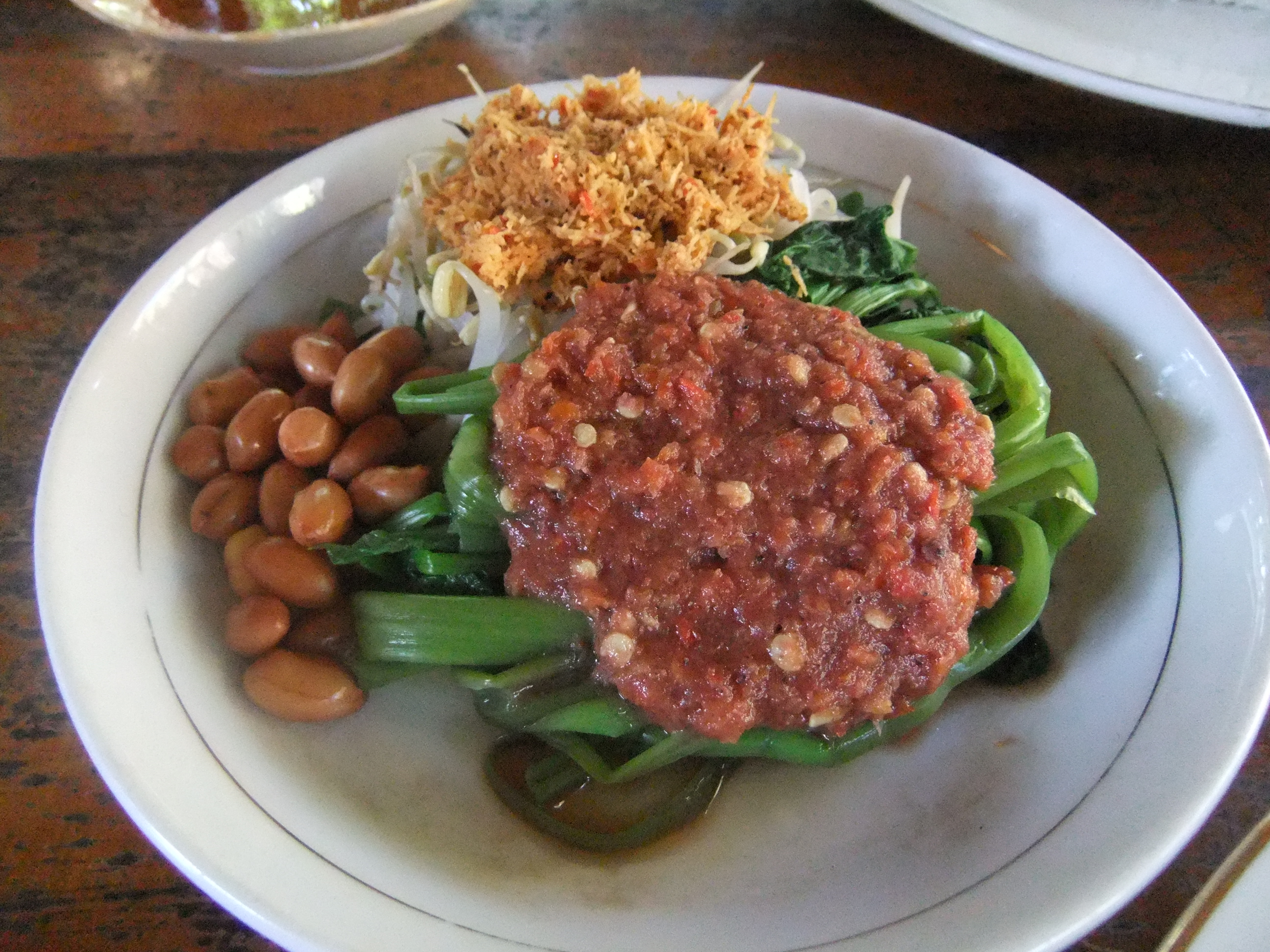
- Plecing kangkung
- Place of origin: Indonesia
- Region or state: Bali and Lombok
- Serving temperature: Cold and fresh
- Main ingredients: Kangkung and plecing sambal

Plecing kangkung is an Indonesian spicy water spinach dish from the island of Bali and Lombok. Plecing kangkung is made from blanched water spinach leaves (Ipomoea aquatica) and served cold with plecing sambal made from ground red chili pepper, shallot, garlic, bird's eye chili, candlenut, kaffir lime, shrimp paste, salt, and sugar. As a side for the Lomboknese dish ayam taliwang and Balinese dish ayam betutu, plecing kangkung is also usually served with additional ingredients such as bean sprouts, string beans, fried peanuts, and urap's grated spicy coconut dressing.

== See also ==
- Tumis kangkung
- Urap
- Gado-gado
- Lalap
