= Mie kangkung =

Indonesian vegetable noodle soup dish

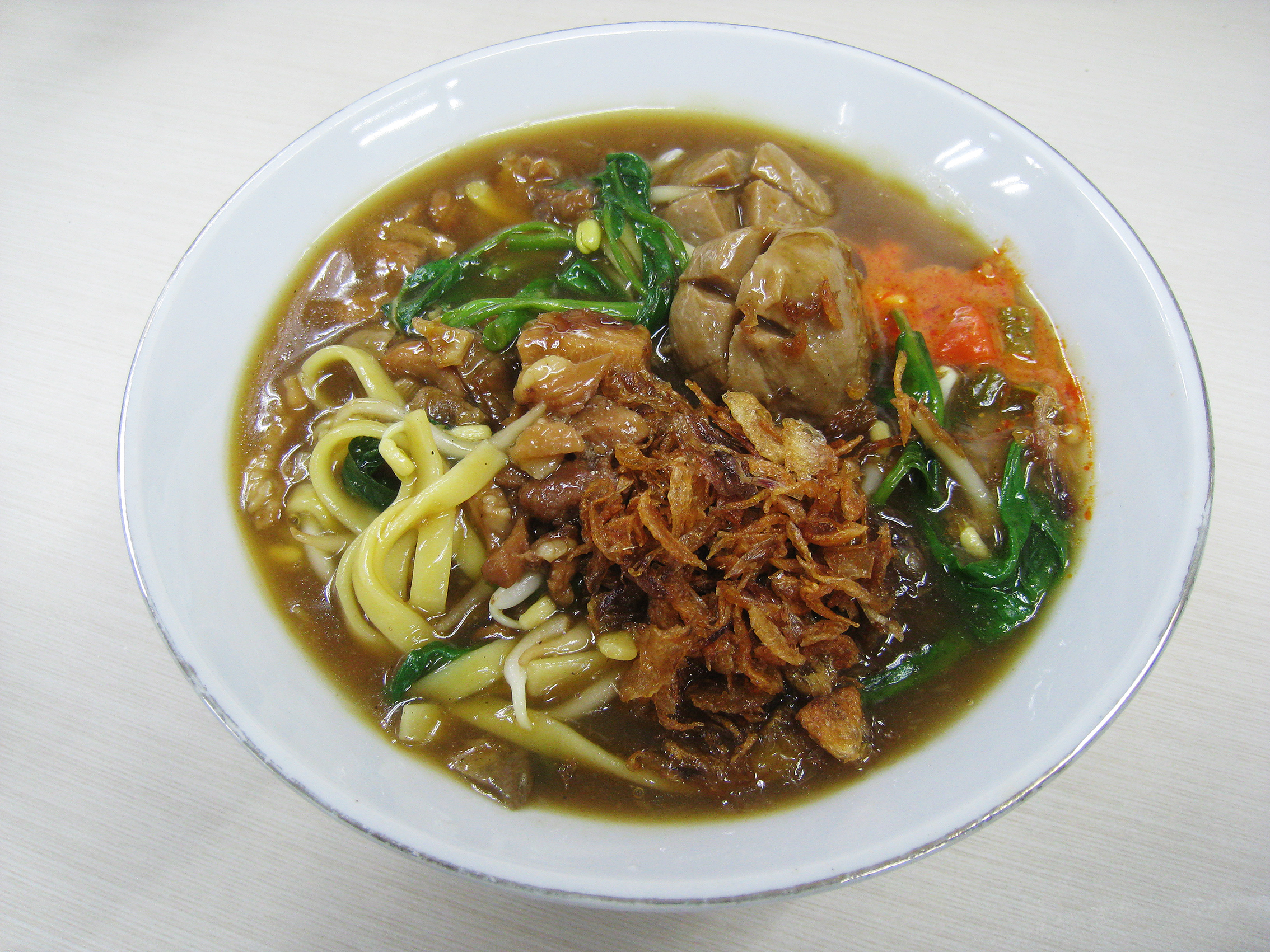
- Mie kangkung in Jakarta
- Alternative names: Mi kangkung
- Type: Noodle soup
- Course: Main
- Place of origin: Indonesia
- Region or state: Jakarta, West Java, Banten
- Serving temperature: Hot
- Main ingredients: Egg noodle, kangkung, kecap manis, mushroom, bakso

Mie kangkung (lit. 'kangkung noodle'), is an Indonesian vegetable noodle soup with kangkung (water spinach), usually served with bakso meatball and mushroom. It is a specialty of Betawi cuisine, Jakarta, Indonesia. The yellow egg noodles come with a brown-colored thick soup, made of chicken or beef broth, which is thickened with tapioca, spiced, and mixed with garlic and kecap manis (sweet soy sauce). Other ingredients include bakso meatballs, bean sprouts, mushrooms, hard-boiled quail eggs and sprinkled with bawang goreng (fried shallots) and added with a dash of kaffir lime juice and sambal.

== See also ==
- Mie ayam
- Mie celor
- Mie kocok
- Mi rebus
- Mie goreng
- Noodle soup
- stir-fried water spinach, or tumis kangkung
