= Sate taichan =

Indonesian dish of skewered and grilled meat, served with a squeezed key lime

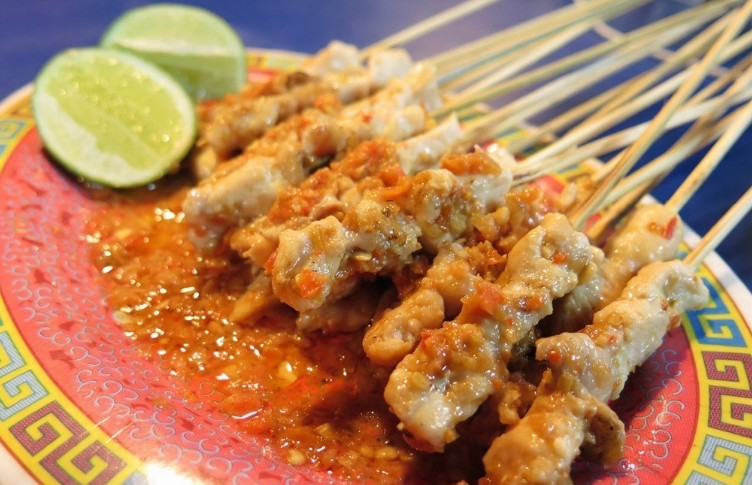
- Sate Taichan sold in Jakarta.
- Course: Main course
- Place of origin: Indonesia
- Region or state: Jakarta, Nationwide
- Serving temperature: Hot
- Main ingredients: Skewered and grilled meats with served with sambal and squeezed key lime

Sate taichan is a variation of chicken satay grilled and served without peanut or kecap seasoning unlike other satays. It is served with sambal and squeezed key lime, while the chicken meat used with this satay is generally plain white in colour and only seasoned with salt, key lime, and chili. Like other satays, sate taichan is sold at night.

== History ==
There are several versions about the origin of sate taichan, although the truth is yet to be confirmed. Initially, there was a young couple (the man was from Japan, while the woman was originally from Indonesia) who wanted to buy satay in the Senayan, Jakarta, around 2012. The Japanese man admitted that he didn't like the Madurese peanut sauce that seasoned the satay at the food stall. He took the initiative to grill his own raw chicken meat that had been skewered with salt and lime, without soy sauce and chilli sauce. After it was cooked, he asked the vendor for chilli sauce to accompany the satay. When the satay vendor asked what satay he was grilling, the Japanese man simply replied ‘satay taichan’, without knowing the reason behind the choice of the name.

Another version of the emergence of satay taichan is the presence of a South Korean expatriate who often eat chicken satay at a satay stall, still in the Senayan area, Jakarta. Because he often eats at the stall, the expatriate got to know the owner of the stall. The South Korean man then taught the shop owner another way of making satay, which became the forerunner of sate taichan. At that time, the seasonings used were all sliced spices such as green chillies, shallots, garlic and salt. Later, the sliced spices were mashed to become a chilli sauce to accompany the plain satay meat.

== See also ==
- Satay
- Sate padang
