= Sate padang =

Indonesian dish

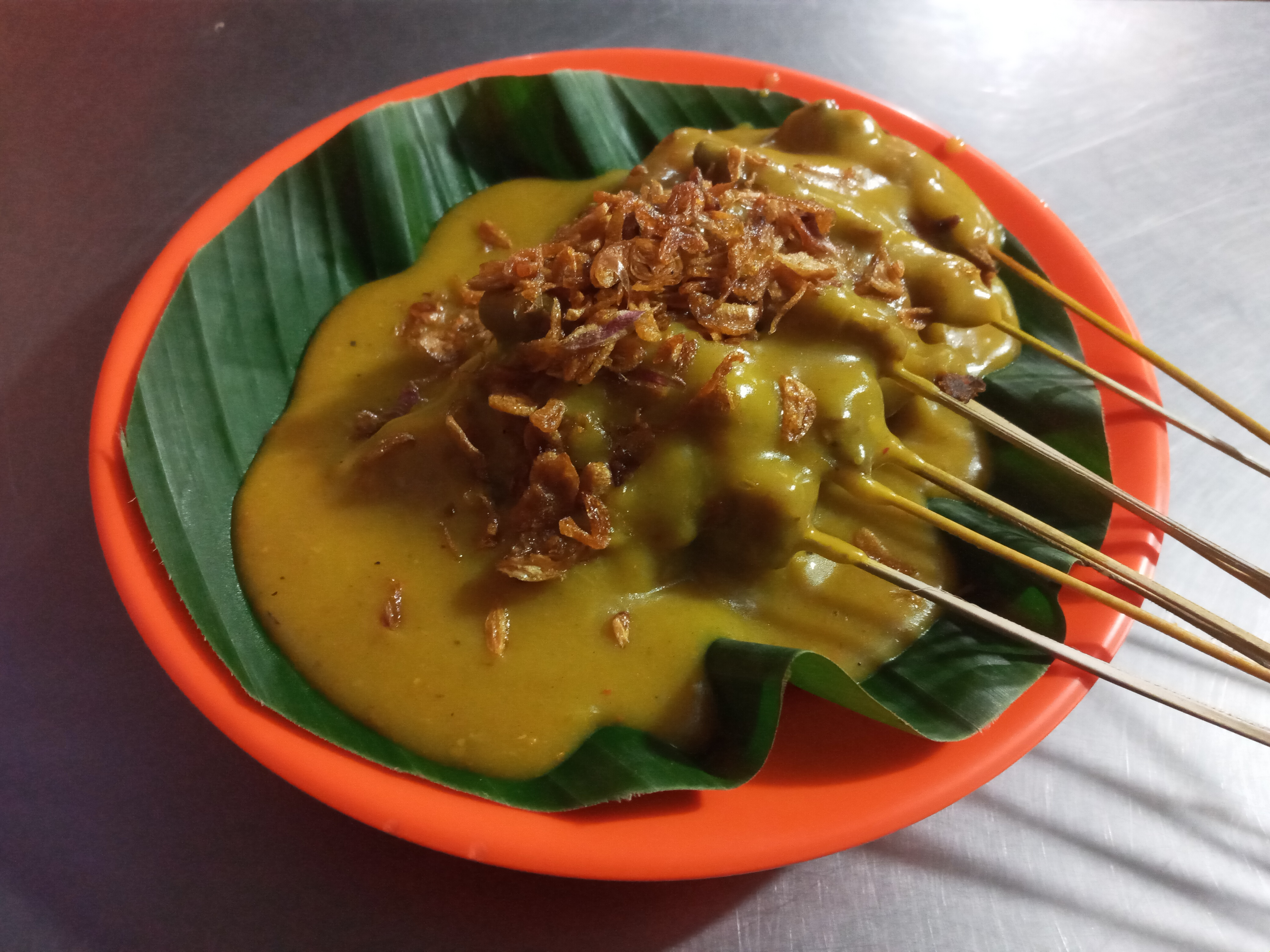
- A plate of sate padang
- Course: Main course
- Place of origin: Indonesia
- Region or state: Padang, Western Sumatra
- Created by: Minangkabaus
- Serving temperature: Hot
- Main ingredients: Beef and offal satay in thick yellow sauce

Sate Padang, more commonly referred to as Padang satay, is a speciality satay from Minangkabau cuisine, made from into small cubes of beef served with a spicy sauce on top. Its main characteristic is a thick yellow sauce made from rice flour mixed with beef and offal broth, turmeric, ginger, garlic, coriander, galangal root, cumin, curry powder, and salt. In Medan, many Sate Padang dishes use not only beef, but also chicken, goat, lamb, and mutton. Also in Medan, fried shallots are served on top of sate padang, and lontong as the side.

There are three types of Sate padang, which are Sate Padang Panjang, Sate Payakumbuh and Sate Pariaman. The three types are differentiated by the colour of their sauce. Sate Padang Panjang usually has yellow-coloured sauce, Sate Payakumbuh has brown-coloured sauce, while Sate Pariaman has red-coloured sauce. Since the sauces are made differently, the taste of each type of sate differs.

Fresh beef is boiled twice in a large drum filled with water to make the meat soft and juicy. Then the meat is sliced into parts and spices are sprinkled on the meat. The broth is then used to make the sauce, mixed with 19 kinds of spices which have been smoothed and stirred with various kinds of chili. All seasonings are then combined and cooked for 15 minutes. The sate will be grilled just before serving, using coconut shell charcoal.

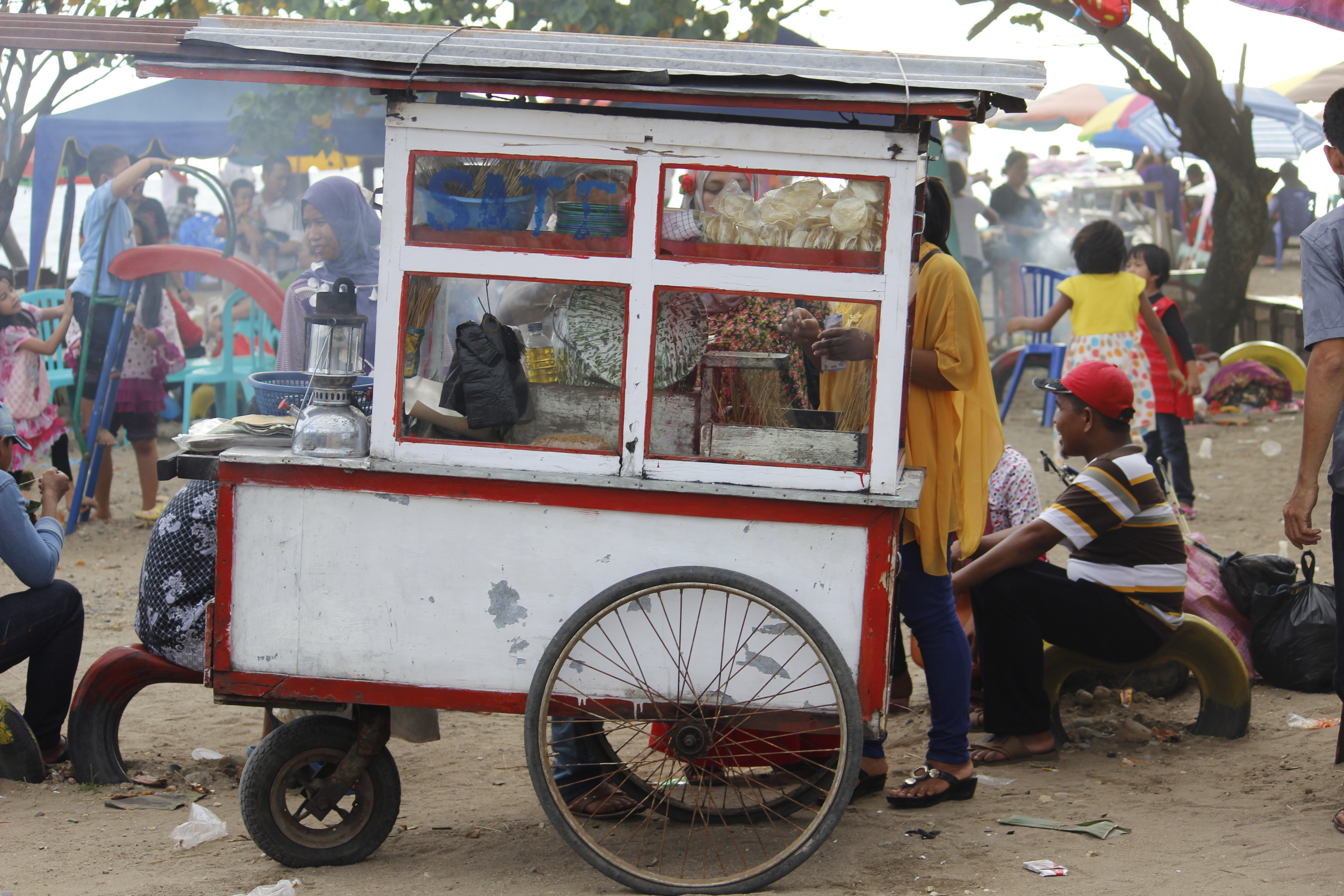
Sate Padang sold in a traditional cart at Puruih Beach, Padang

== See also ==
- Satay
- Sate kambing
- Sate taichan
- Padang cuisine
