= Nasi kapau =

Indonesian rice dish

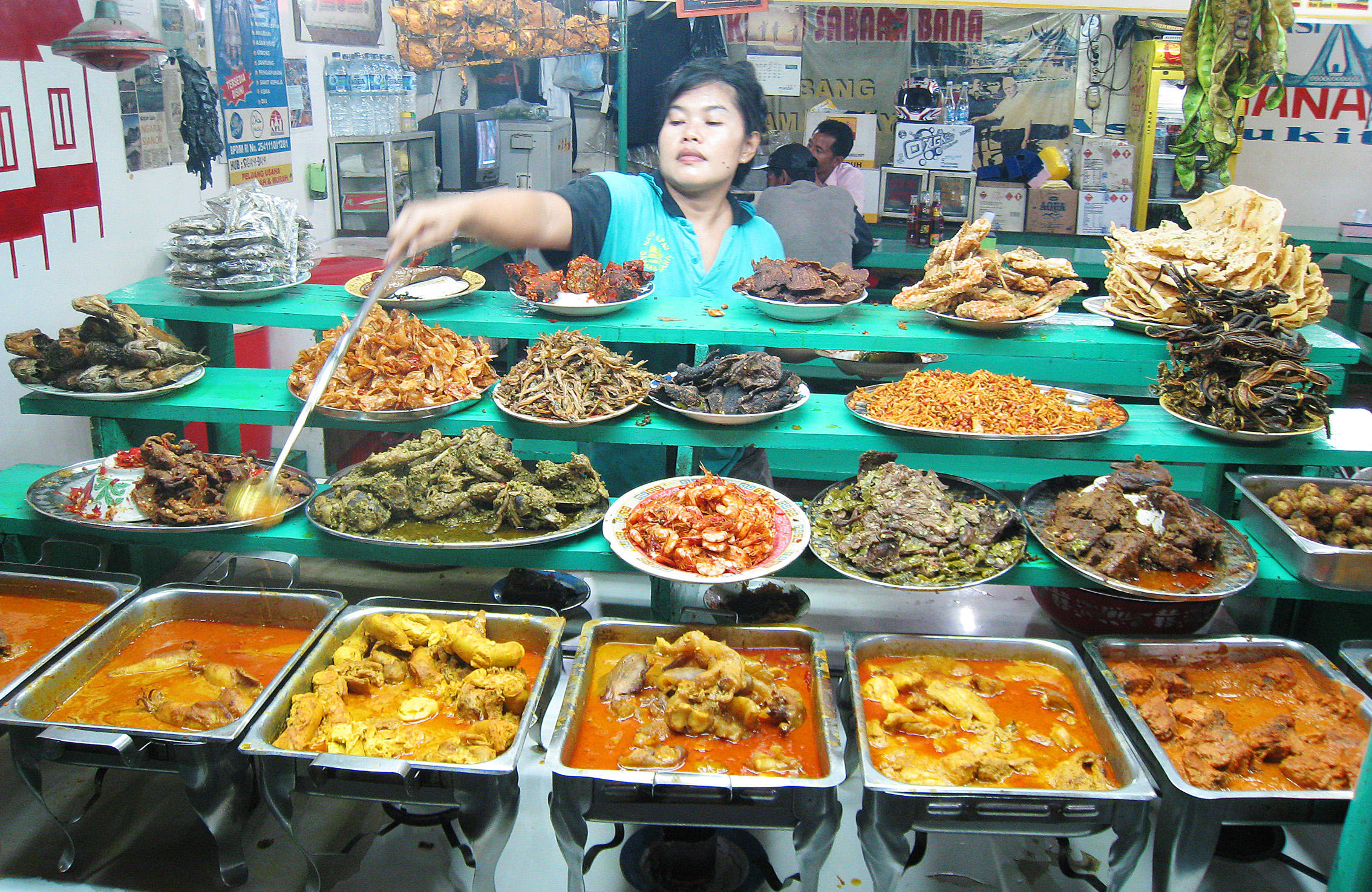
- The array of the dishes of nasi kapau
- Course: Main course
- Place of origin: Indonesia
- Region or state: West Sumatra
- Serving temperature: hot or room temperature

Nasi kapau is Minangkabau steamed rice topped with various choices of dishes, originated from Nagari Kapau, Bukittinggi, a tourism and culinary hotspot town in West Sumatra, Indonesia. It is often described as a Minang version of nasi ramas or nasi campur (mixed rice).

A nasi kapau food stall usually consists of stages and rows of large bowls, plates or saucepans filled with various dishes. In nasi kapau food stalls, after the customer is seated, they are asked which dishes they desire. The waiter then prepares hot steamed rice on a plate with cubadak (unripe jackfruit gulai), and boiled cassava leaf, and sambal on the side. The chosen dishes will be put directly — using long serving spoons — upon the steamed rice or in separate small plates. Nasi kapau eating establishments usually insist on using high-quality fragrant rice directly brought from Bukittinggi and Agam Regency.

In Minang food establishments, it is common to eat with one's hands. They usually provide kobokan, a bowl of tap water with a slice of lime in it to give a fresh scent. This water is used to wash one's hands before and after eating. If a customer does not wish to eat with bare hands, it is acceptable to ask for a spoon and fork.

== Dishes ==
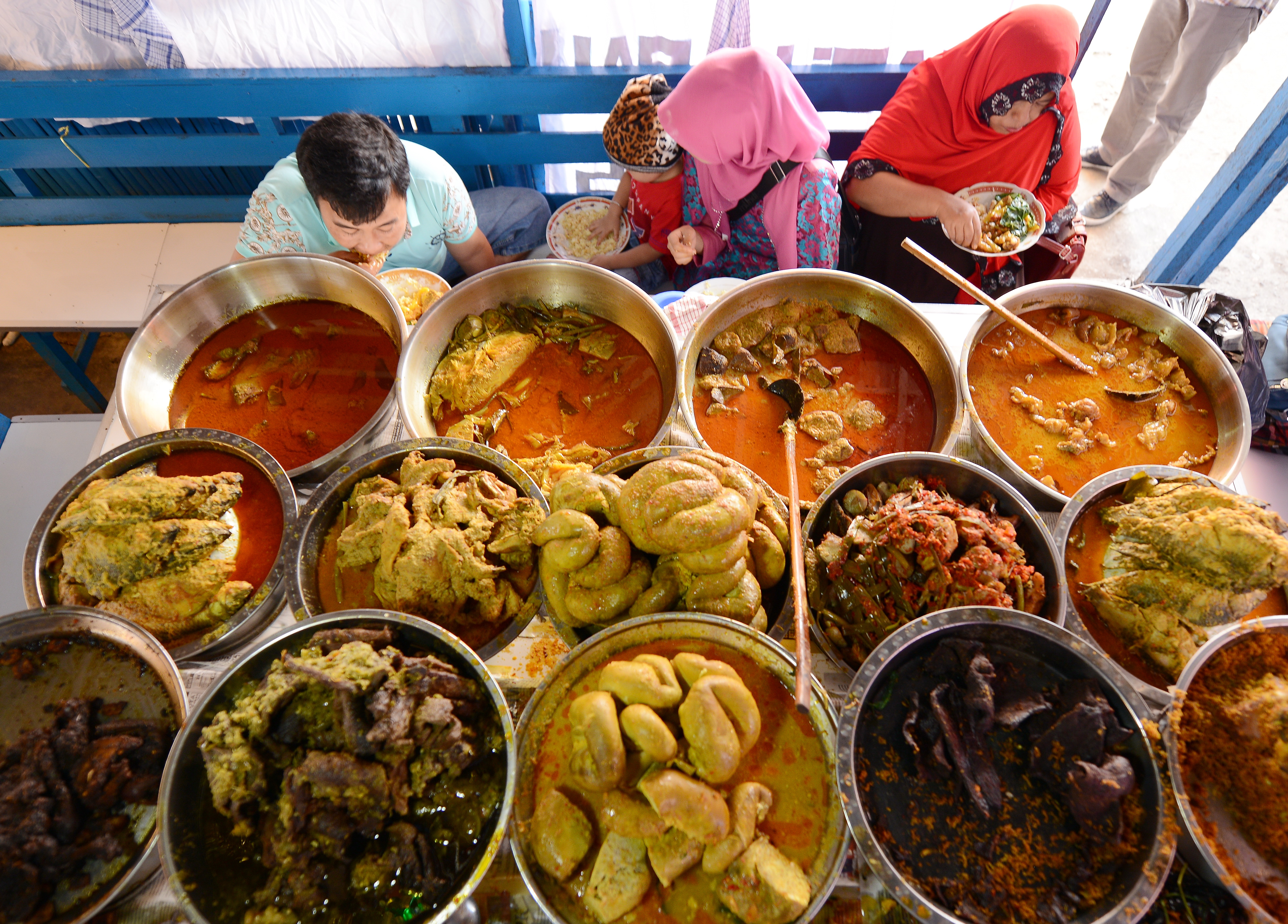
Various types of gulais offered in nasi kapau food stall, Agam Regency, West Sumatra, Indonesia.

Nasi kapau dishes are actually quite similar or almost identical with nasi padang from Padang city. The differences mainly lies in the method of serving, and sometimes there are some typical Kapau Bukittinggi dishes that seldom served in common Padang restaurants. The dishes offered in nasi kapau are:

- Rendang, chunks of beef stewed in spicy coconut milk and chili gravy, cooked well until dried. Other than beef, rendang ayam (chicken rendang) and rendang itik (duck rendang) can be found.
- Daun ubi tumbuk, cassava leaves in coconut milk
- Kalio, similar to rendang; while rendang is rather dry, kalio is watery and light-colored
- Gulai ayam, chicken gulai
- Gulai cancang, gulai of meats and cow internal organs
- Gulai tunjang, gulai of cow foot tendons
- Gulai babek, gulai babat or gulai paruik kabau, gulai of cow tripes
- Gulai iso or gulai usus, gulai of cow intestines usually filled with eggs and tofu
- Gulai impo, gulai of cow spleen
- Gulai ati, gulai of cow liver
- Gulai otak, gulai of cow brain
- Gulai sumsum, gulai of cow bone marrow
- Gulai gajeboh, cow fat gulai
- Gulai itiak, duck gulai
- Gulai talua, boiled eggs gulai
- Gulai kepala ikan kakap merah, red snapper's head gulai
- Gulai jariang, jengkol stinky bean gulai
- Dendeng batokok, thin crispy beef
- Dendeng balado, thin crispy beef with chili
- Paru goreng, fried cow lung
- Ayam bakar, grilled spicy chicken
- Ayam goreng, fried chicken with spicy granules
- Ayam pop, Minang-style chicken, boiled or steamed and later fried. While fried chicken is golden brown, ayam pop is light-colored.
- Ikan bilih, fried small freshwater fish of the genus Mystacoleucus
- Baluik goreng, crispy fried small freshwater eel
- Udang balado, shrimp in chili
- Rajungan goreng, crispy fried crab
- Terong balado, eggplant in chili
- Petai goreng, fried green stinky bean (Parkia speciosa)
- Ikan asam padeh
- Peyek udang, shrimp rempeyek
- Kerupuk jangek, cow's skin krupuk
- Sambal balado, sambal with large sliced chilli pepper
- Sambal lado tanak

== See also ==
- Cuisine of Indonesia
- Nasi campur
- Nasi kari
- Nasi uduk
- Nasi ulam
