= Padang cuisine =

Cuisine of the Minangkabau people of Indonesia

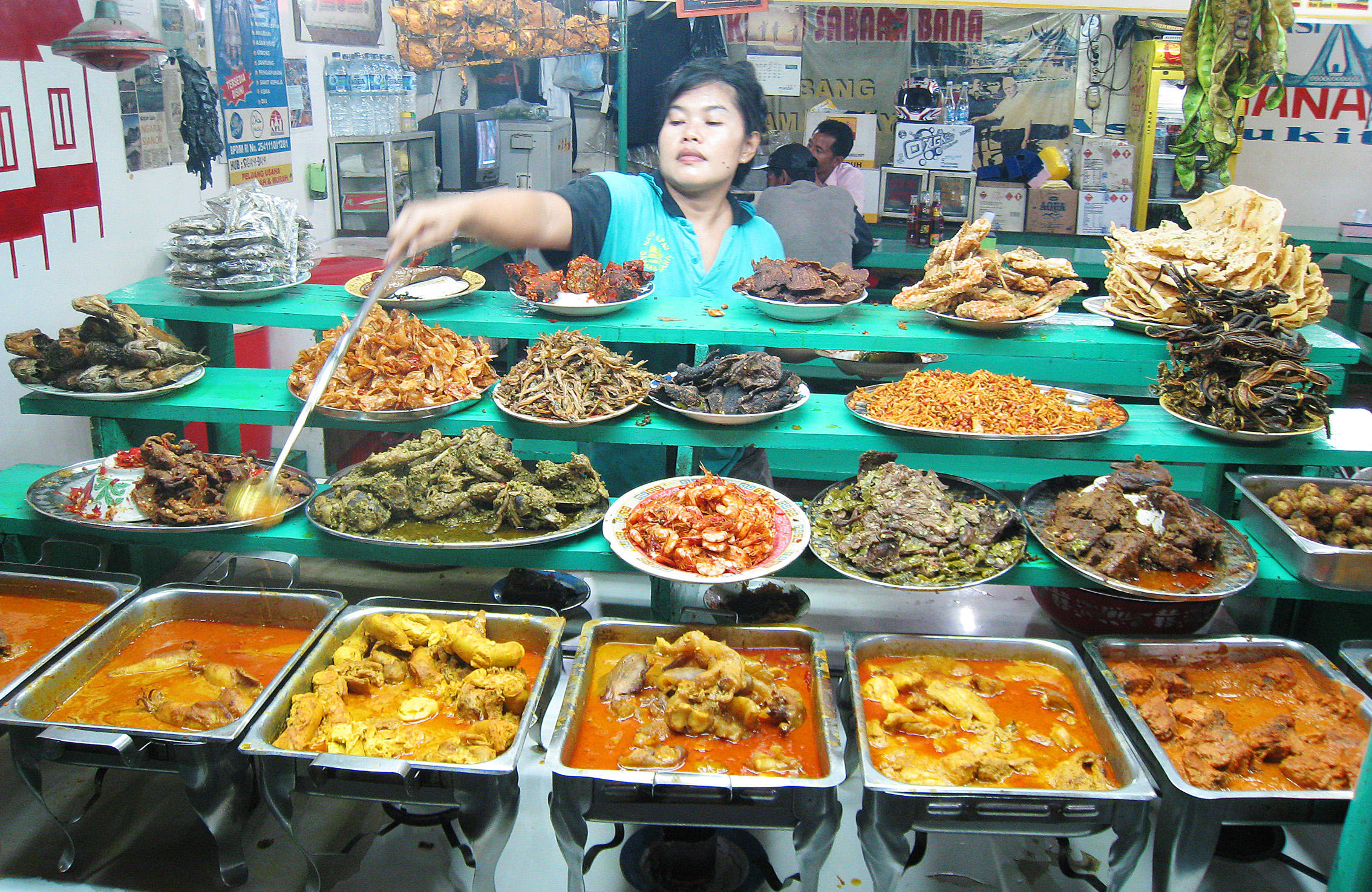
An array of nasi kapau dishes, Minangkabau Bukittinggi cuisine.

Padang cuisine or Minangkabau cuisine is the cuisine of the Minangkabau people of West Sumatra, Indonesia. It is among the most popular cuisines in Maritime Southeast Asia. It is known across Indonesia as masakan Padang after Padang, the capital city of Western Sumatra province. It is served in restaurants mostly owned by perantauan (migrating) Minangkabau people in Indonesian cities. Padang food is ubiquitous in Indonesian cities and is popular in neighboring Malaysia, Southern Philippines, East Timor, Brunei, and Singapore.

Padang food is famous for its use of coconut milk and spicy chili. Minang cuisine consists of three main elements: gulai (curry), lado (chili pepper) and bareh (rice). Among the cooking traditions in Indonesian cuisine, Minangkabau cuisine and most of Sumatran cuisine are influenced by Indian and Middle Eastern cuisine, with dishes cooked in curry sauce with coconut milk and a wide variety of spice mixes.

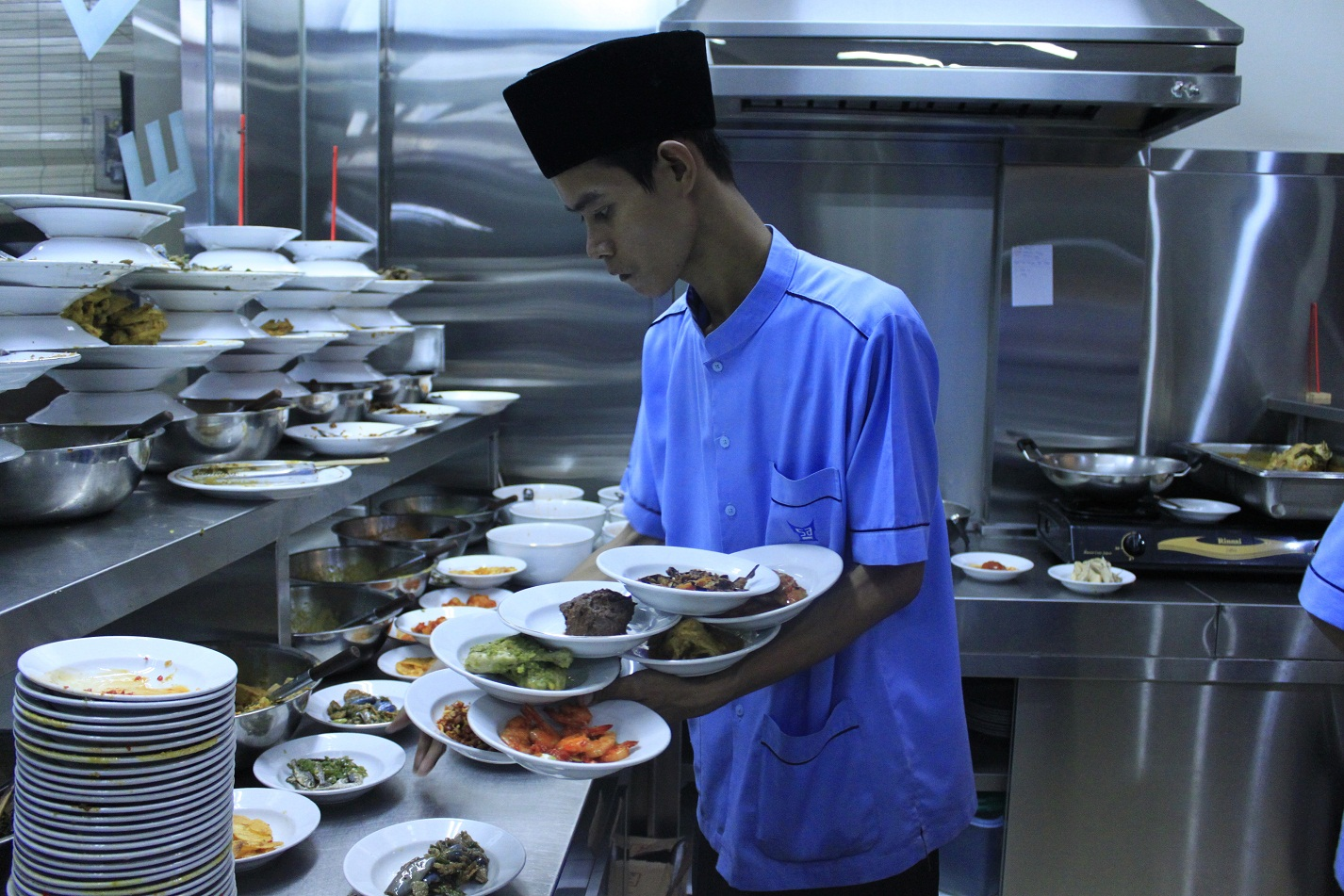
Padang restaurant waiters are known for their exceptional skill of carrying multiple plates in their hands when serving the hidang style.

Because most Minangkabau people are Muslims, Minangkabau cuisine follows halal dietary law rigorously. Most of its protein is taken from beef, chicken, water buffalo, goat, lamb, mutton, poultry and fish. Minangkabau people are known for their fondness of cattle meat products including offal. Almost all the parts of cattle are used in Minangkabau dishes. Seafood is popular in coastal West Sumatran cities, and most are grilled or fried with spicy chili sauce or in curry gravy. Fish, shrimp, and cuttlefish are cooked in similar fashion. Most Minangkabau food is eaten with hot steamed rice or compressed rice such as katupek (ketupat). Vegetables are mostly boiled, such as boiled cassava leaf, or simmered in thin curry as side dishes, such as gulai of young jackfruit or cabbage.

== Etymology ==
In popular usage prevalent in Indonesia and neighboring countries, the term "Padang food" is often used generally to refer to the culinary traditions of the Minangkabau people of Western Sumatra. However, this term is seldom used in Minangkabau inland cities itself, such as Bukittinggi, a culinary hotspot in West Sumatra, where they refer to it as "Minang cuisine" or "Minang food" instead. This is partly because many Minangkabau nagari (counties) take pride in their culinary legacies, and because there are differences between Padang rice of Padang and kapau rice of Bukittinggi.

== Padang restaurants ==
In Padang food establishments, it is common to eat with one's hands. They usually provide kabasuah, a bowl of tap water with a slice of lime in it to give a fresh scent. This water is used to wash one's hands before and after eating. If a customer does not want to eat with bare hands, it is acceptable to ask for a spoon and fork.

The food is usually cooked once per day. When eating nasi Padang (Padang rice) in restaurants, customers choose from various dishes which are left on display in high-stacked plates in the windows. In a dine-in hidang style Padang restaurant, after the customers are seated, they do not have to order. Rather, the waiter sets the table with dozens of small dishes filled with various dishes. Customers take only what they want from this array, and they pay only for what they take. The best known Padang dish is rendang, a spicy meat stew. Soto Padang (crispy beef in spicy soup) is commonly eaten for breakfast, while sate (beef satay in curry sauce served with ketupat) is served in the evening.

The serving style is different in nasi kapau food stalls, a Minangkabau Bukittinggi style. After the customer is seated, he or she orders specific dishes, which will be put directly upon the steamed rice or in separate small plates.

There are many Padang food establishments throughout Indonesia and surrounding countries, according to Ikatan Warung Padang Indonesia (Iwapin) or Warung Padang Bonds. In greater Jakarta alone there are at least 20,000 Padang restaurant establishments. Several notable Minangkabau restaurant chains are Sederhana, Garuda, Pagi Sore, Simpang Raya, Sari Ratu, Sari Bundo, Payakumbuah and Natrabu.

Padang cuisine

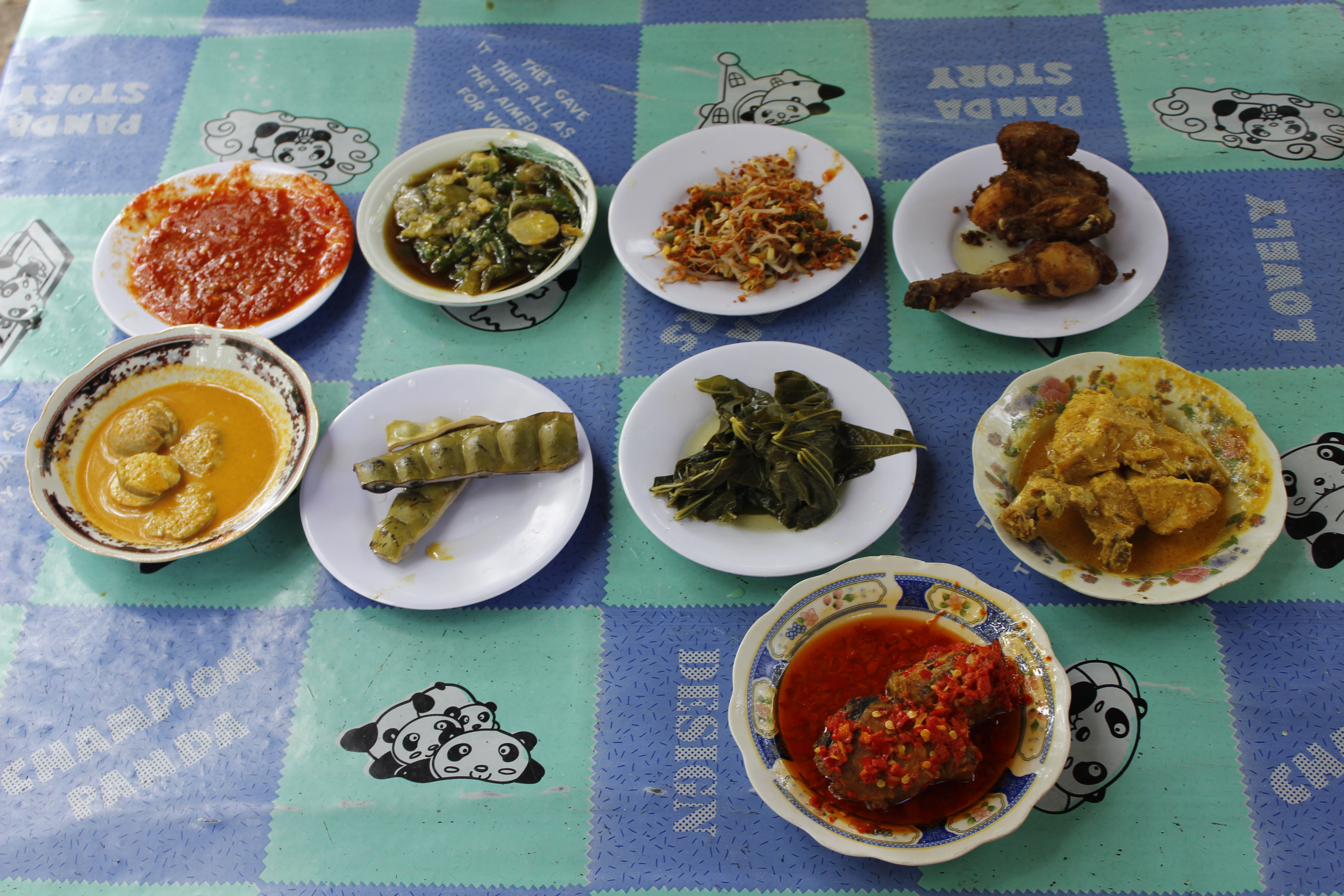
Padang cuisine served in a beach stall in Gandoriah Beach, Pariaman. Dishes in coastal areas of West Sumatra are mostly sea produce, such as fishes and prawns.

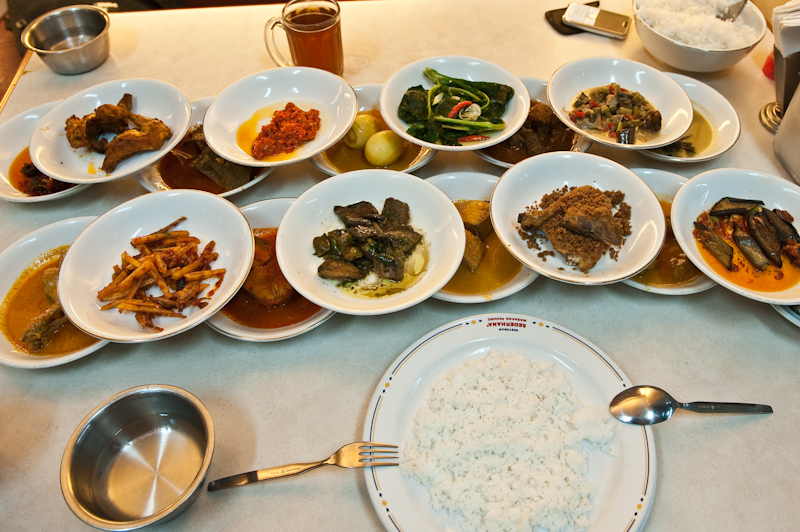
The hidang style Padang food served at Sederhana restaurant; all of the bowls of food are laid out in front of customer. The customer only pays for whatever bowl they eat from.

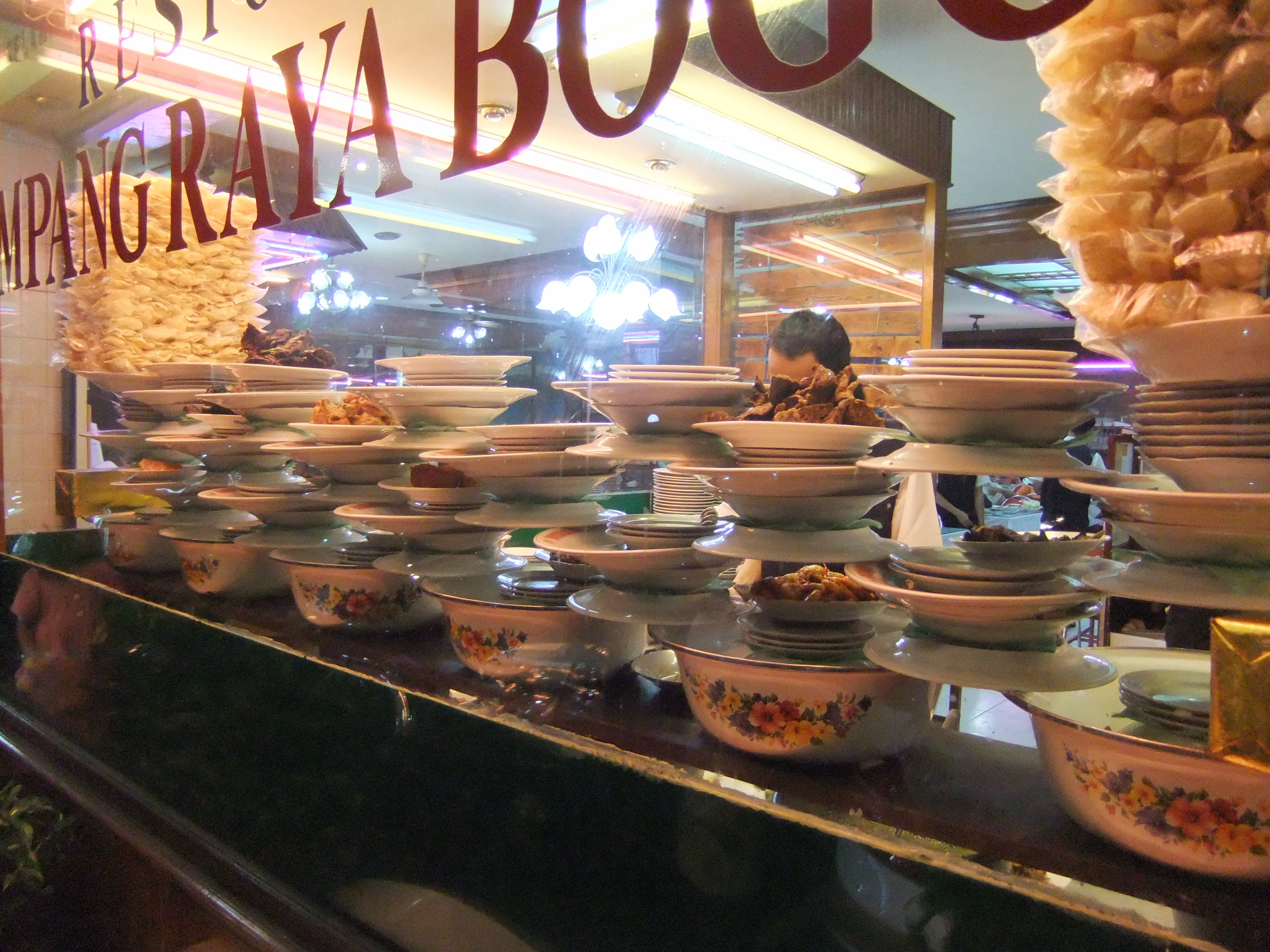
An array of Padang dishes arranged in a restaurant window.

== List of Minangkabawi foods ==
Minangkabawi cuisine

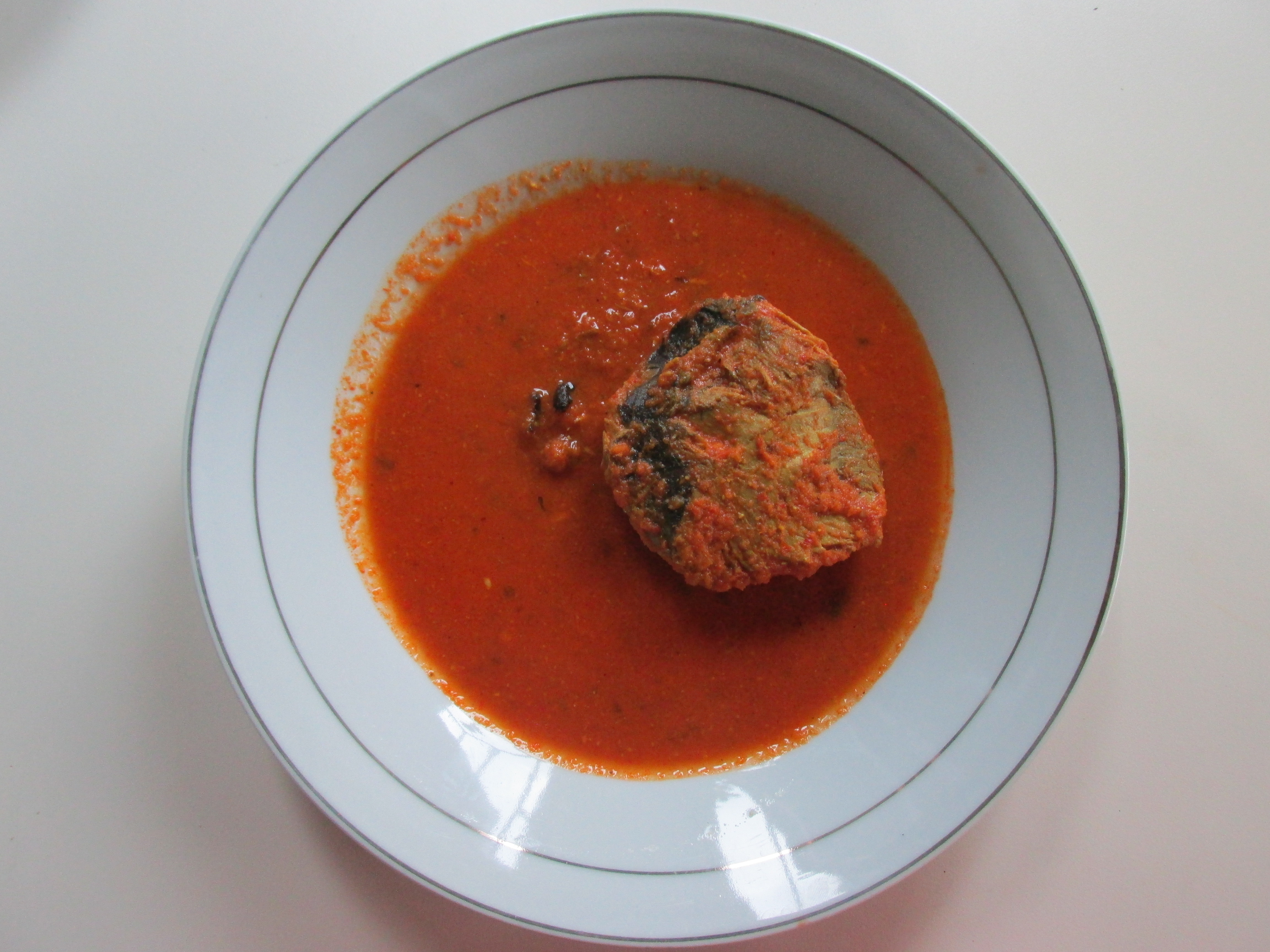
Asam padeh lauak (Fish asam padeh)

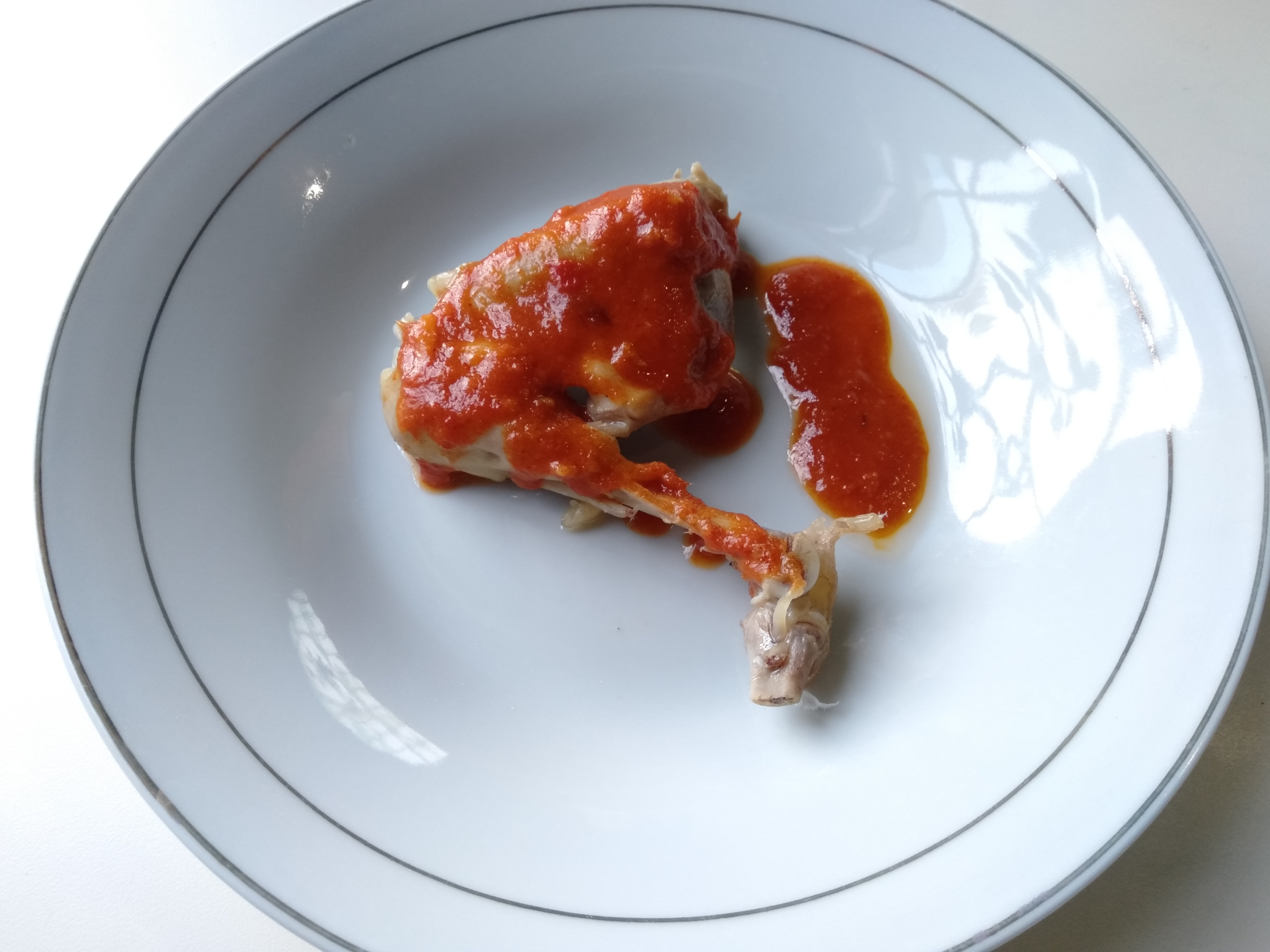
Ayam pop

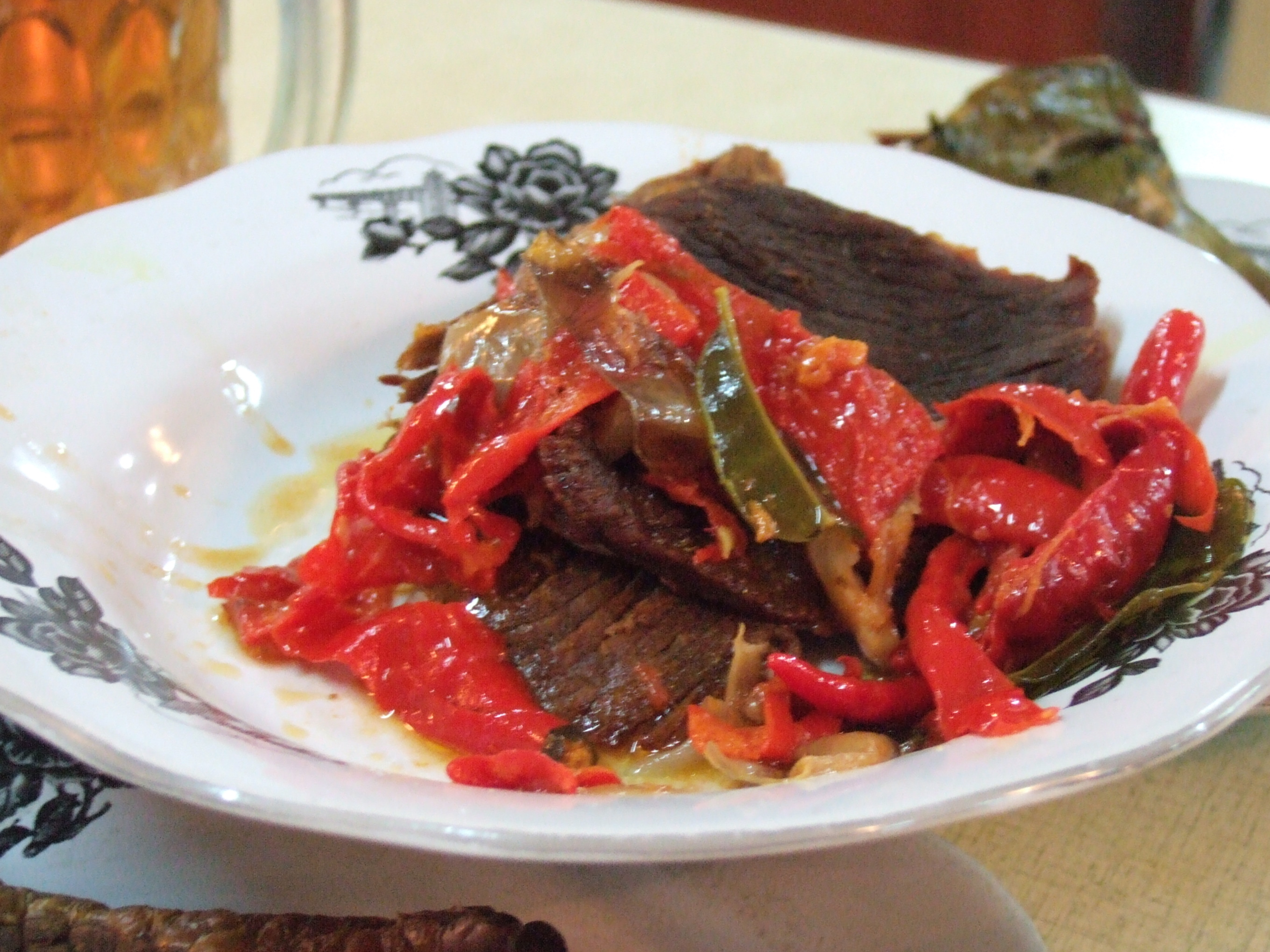
Dendeng balado

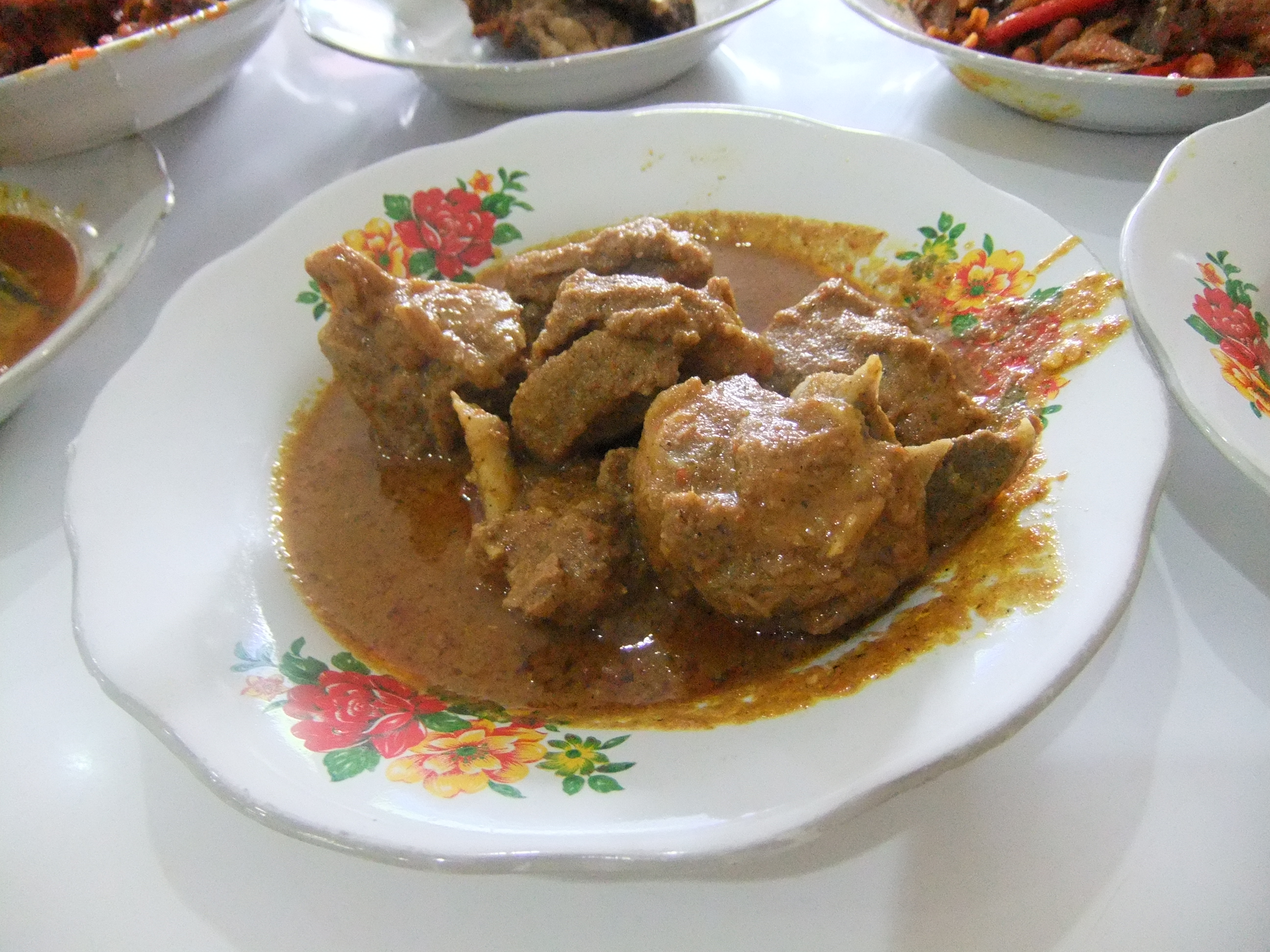
Gulai kambiang (Mutton gulai)

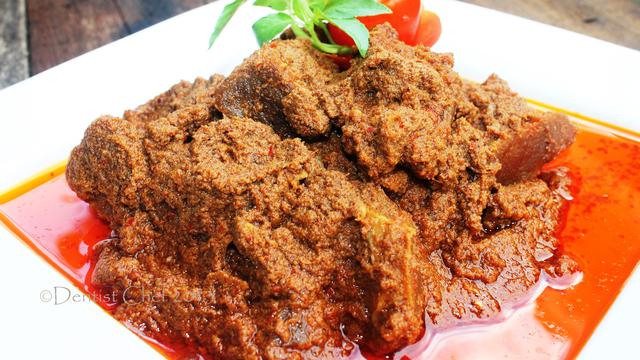
Rendang

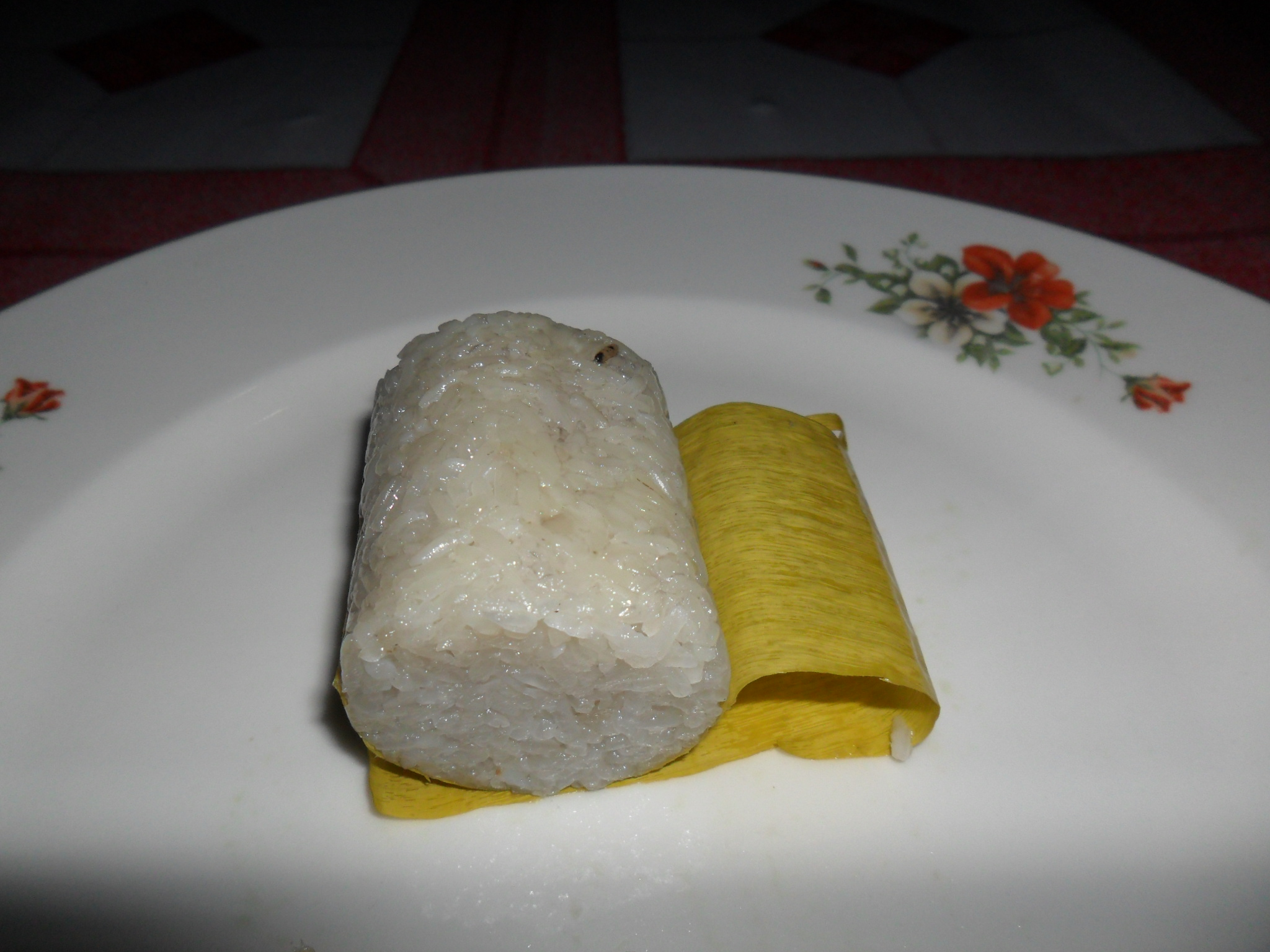
Lamang

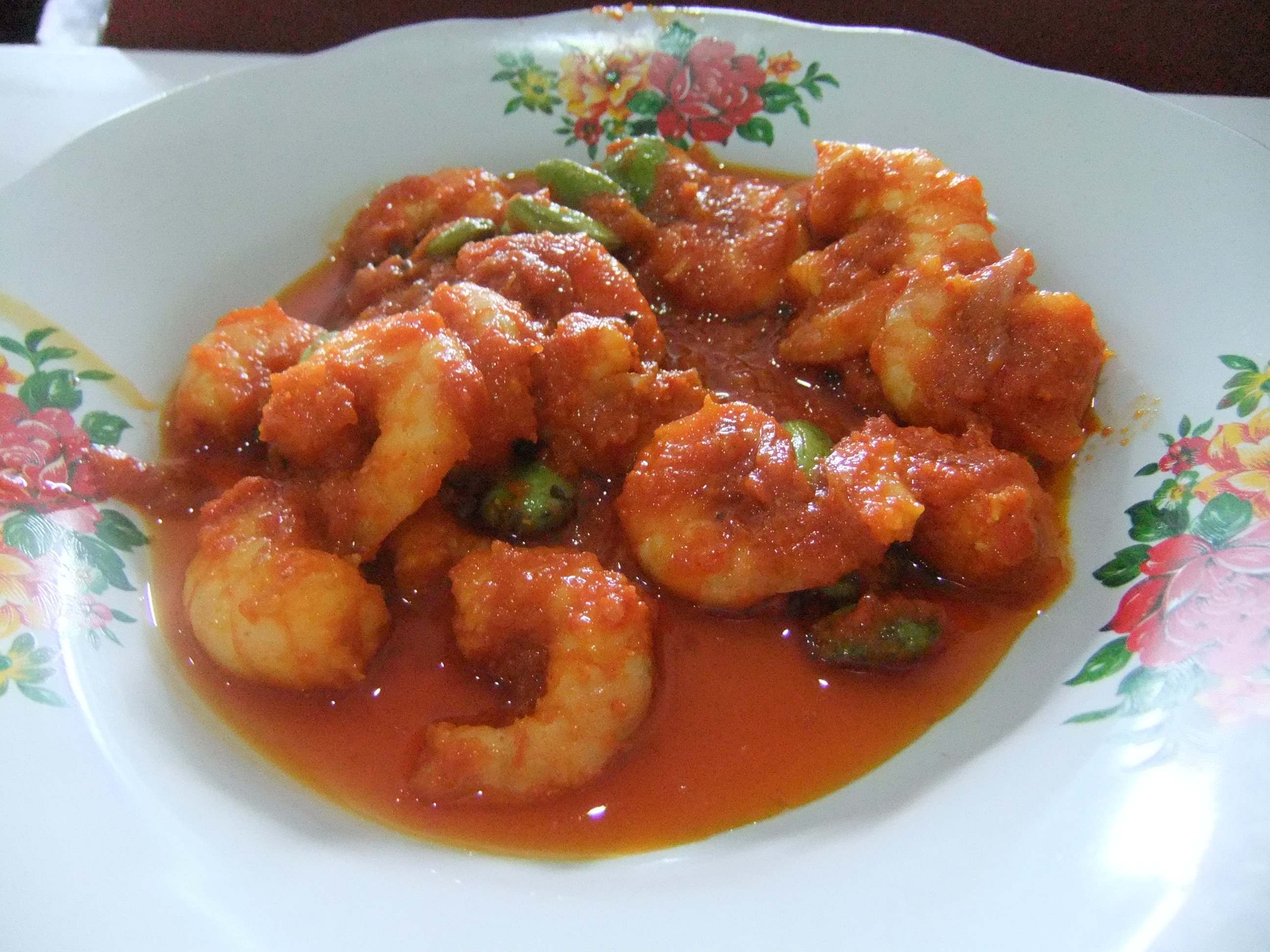
Udang balado (Shrimp balado)

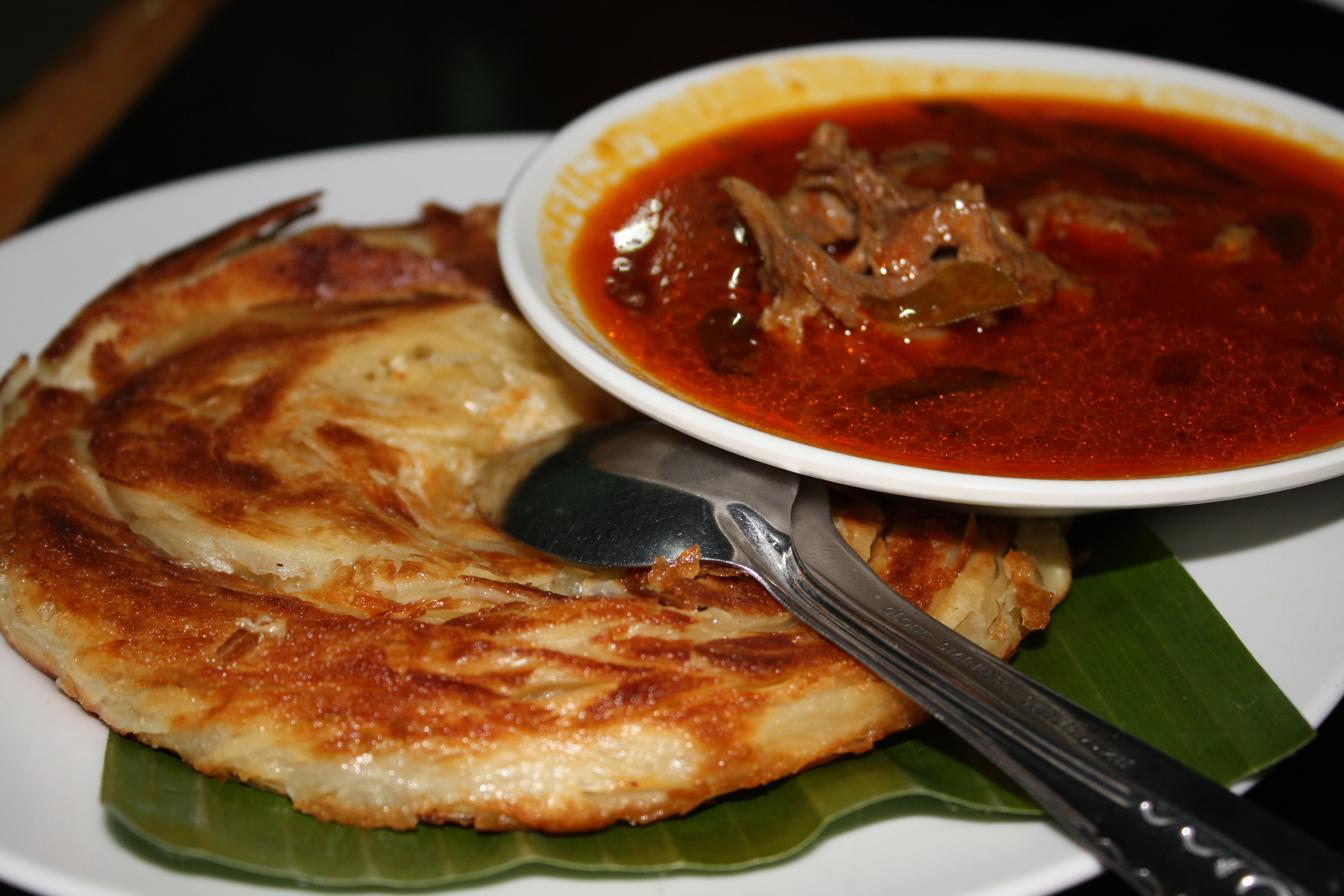
Paratto ala Cannai

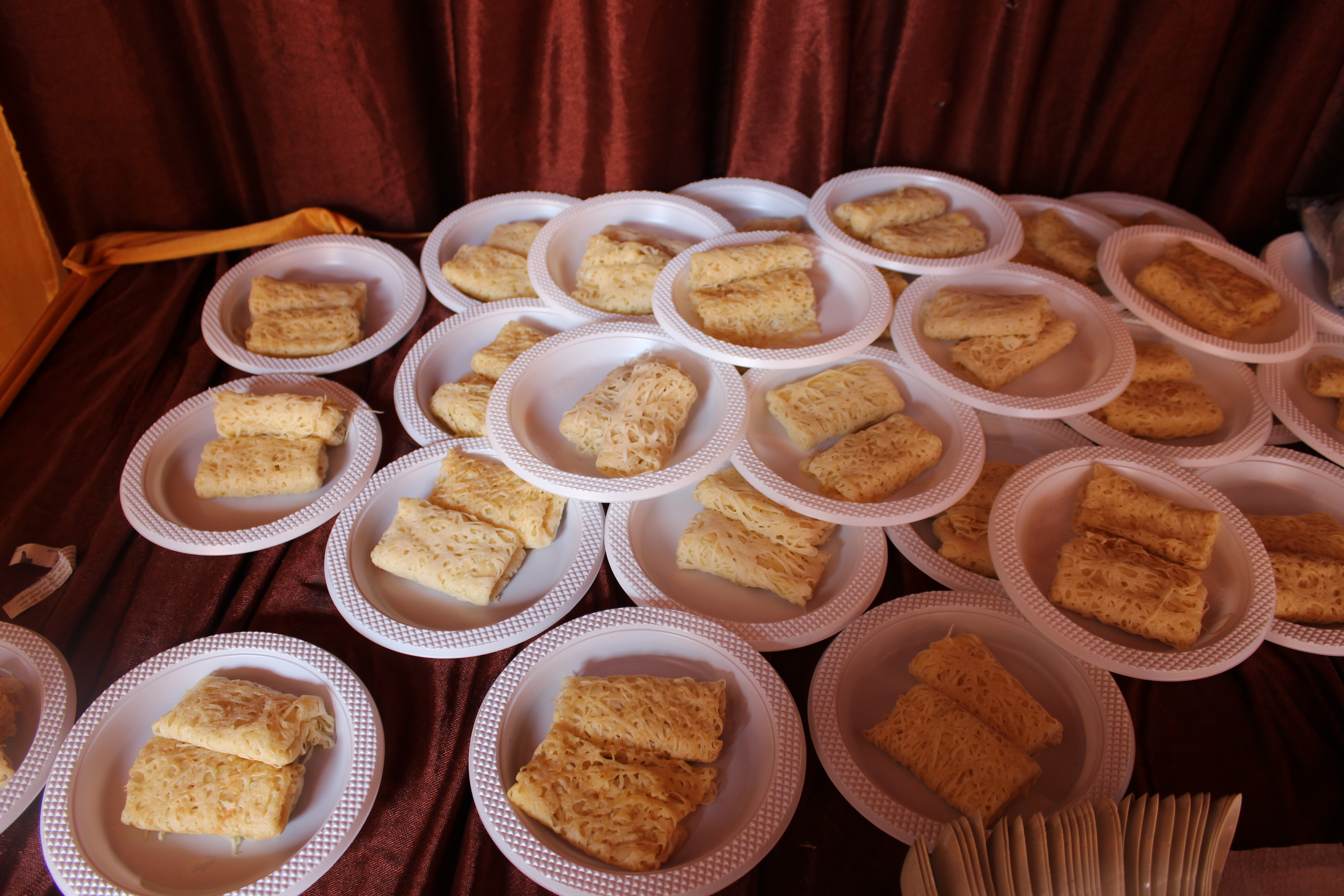
Paratto jalo

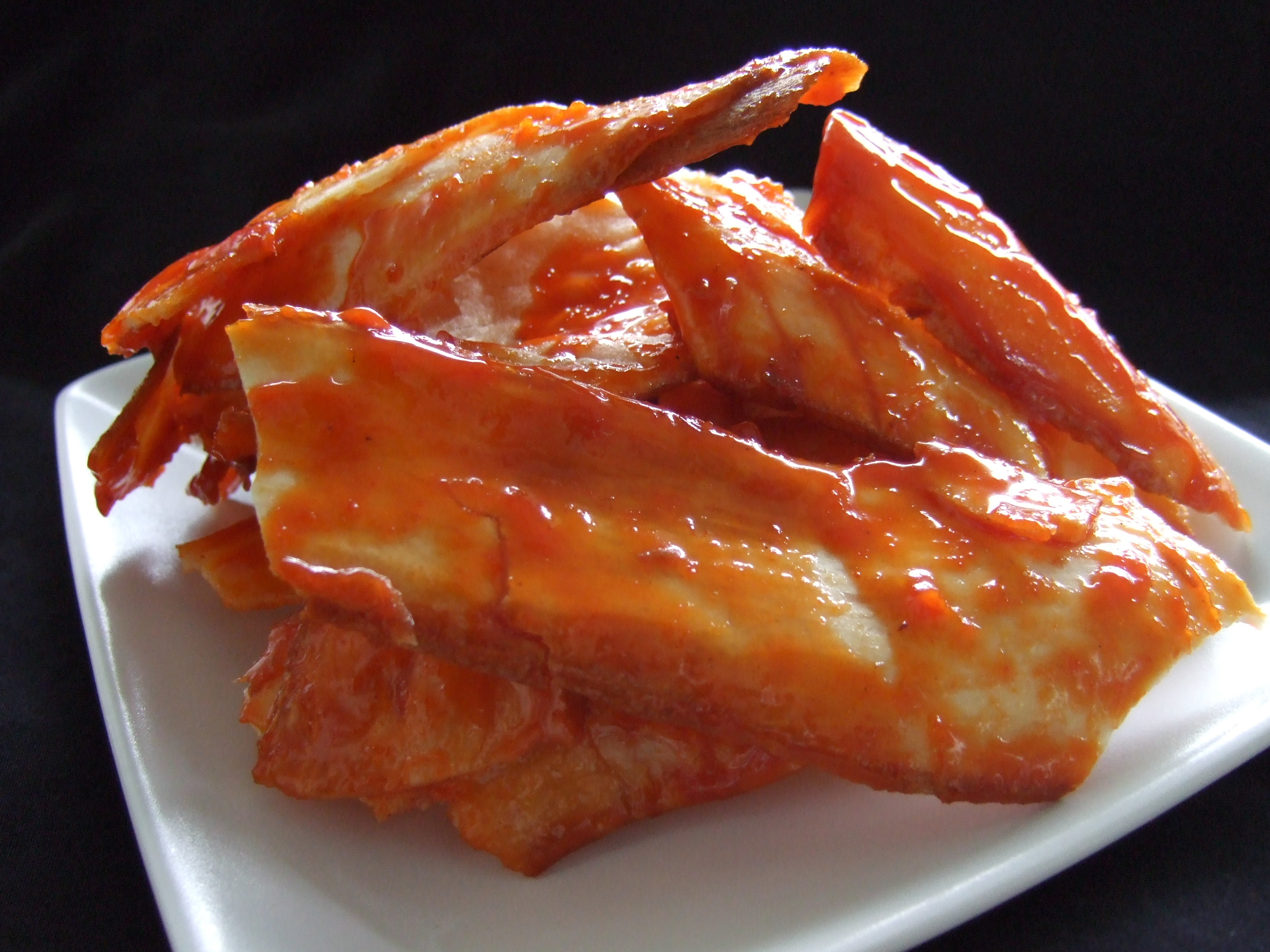
Karipiak sanjai (Sanjay crisps)

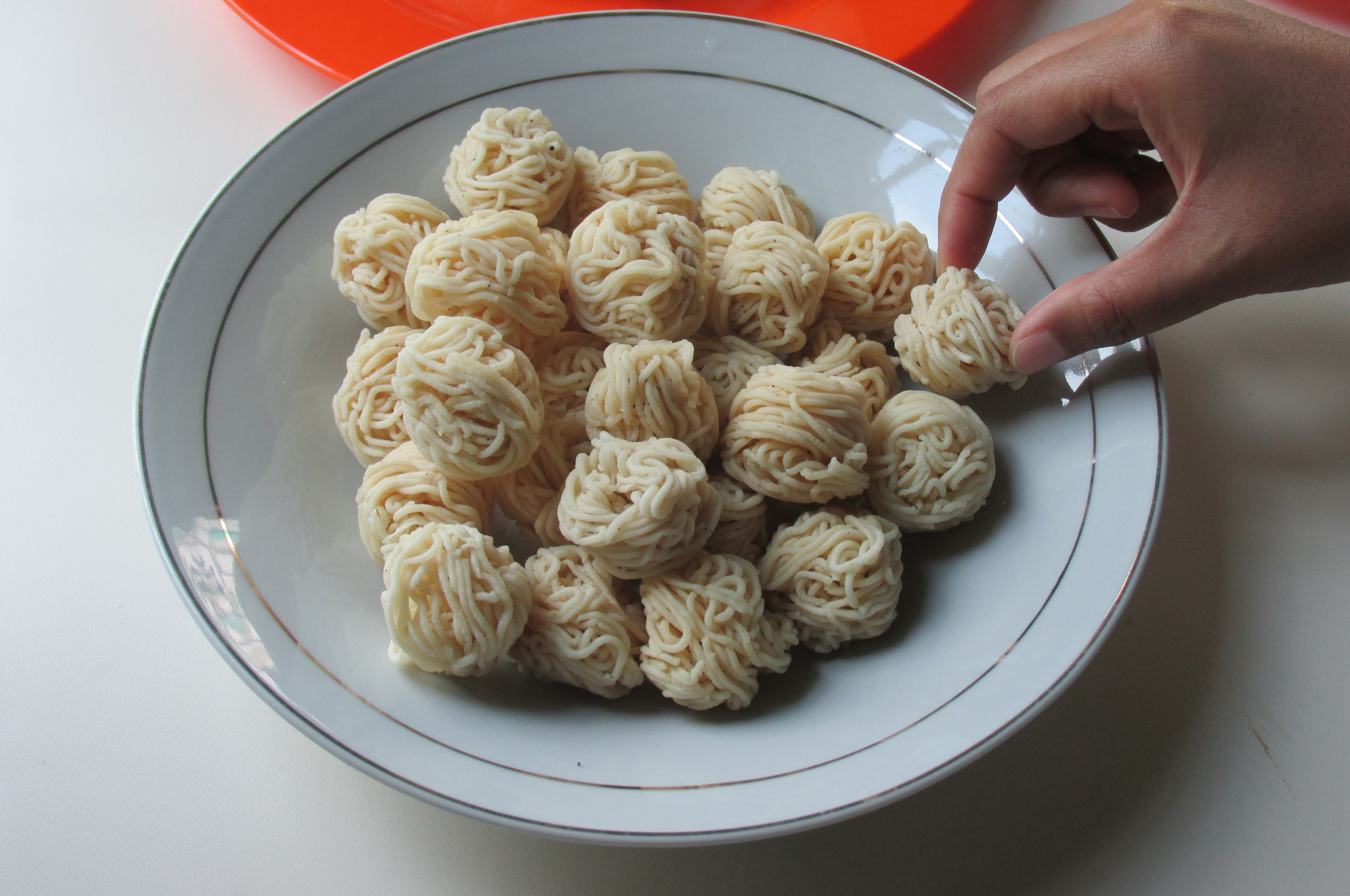
Dakak-dakak

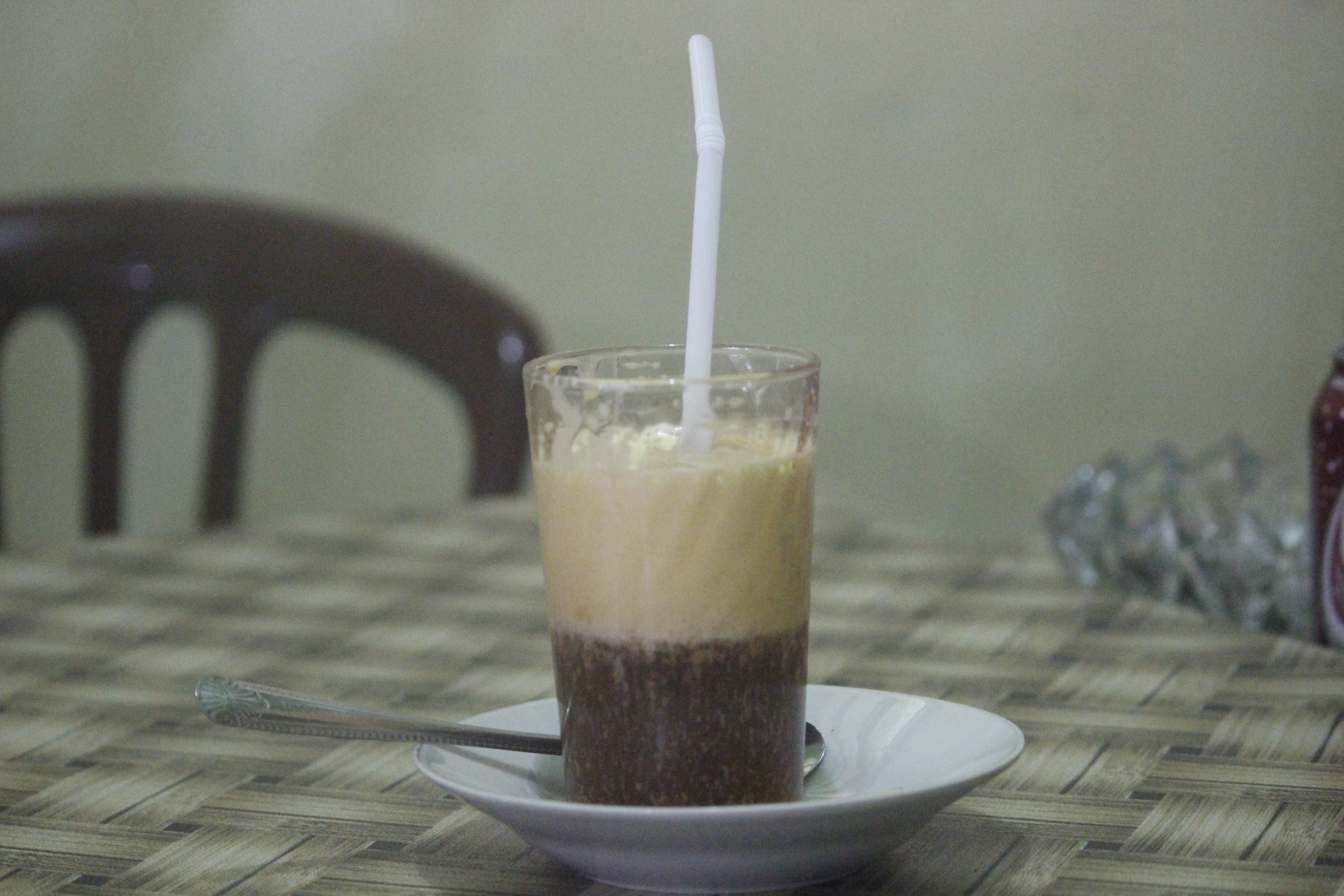
Teh talua (Sweet egg tea)

=== Dishes ===
The cooking method of the first phase of Minangkabawi curry or gulai, which employing certain ingredients; meat, poultry, vegetables, fish or seafood simmered and slowly cooked in coconut milk, spice mixture and chili pepper, formed the backbone of Minangkabawi cooking tradition. The thick golden, yellowish, succulent and spicy gulai sauce has become the hallmark of Minangkabawi-themed restaurants' window displays everywhere. In West Sumatra, a smart cook has to be able to prepare a gulai. Randang (the last phase of or the caramelised Minangkabawi curry), asam padeh (sour and spicy Minangkabawi curry) and kalio (the second phase of Minangkabawi curry or the intermediate Minangkabawi curry's phase between gulai and randang) are other variations of Minangkabawi curry.

- Asam padeh, sour and spicy version of Minangkabawi curry made with various types of meat.
- Ayam baka, grilled spicy chicken.
- Ayam balado, marinated chicken cooked in samba lado sirah.
- Ayam babumbu, fried marinated chicken with ambu-ambu (fried shredded coconut).
- Ayam guriang, fried marinated chicken.
- Ayam lado mudo, marinated chicken cooked in samba lado mudo.
- Ayam paracik, grilled chicken with a spicy, curry-like sauce.
- Ayam pop, Coastal Minangkabawi-style chicken, infused boiled/steamed and later fried. While fried chicken is golden brown, ayam pop is light-colored.
- Balado, chili paste similar to sambal with large sliced chili pepper, usually stir fried together with main ingredients, when sauted becomes samba lado sirah.
- Baluik guriang, crispy fried small freshwater eel.
- Bilih guriang, fried small Singkarak-endemic freshwater fish of the genus Mystacoleucus.
- Bubua kampiun, porridge made from rice flour mixed with brown sugar.
- Dendeng, thinly sliced dried meat.
- Dendeng balado, thin crispy beef with chili.
- Dendeng batokok, thin strips of pounded and softened grilled beef .
- Gulai, curry dish with main ingredients might be poultry, goat meat, beef, mutton, various kinds of offal, fish and seafood, and also vegetables such as cassava leaves and unripe jackfruit.
- Gulai ati, gulai of cow liver.
- Gulai ayam, chicken gulai.
- Gulai babek, gulai babaik, or gulai paruik kabau, gulai of bovine tripes.
- Gulai banak, gulai of bovine brain.
- Gulai cancang, gulai of bovine meats and internal organs.
- Gulai gajeboh, bovine fat gulai.
- Gulai tambunsu, gulai of bovine intestines usually filled with eggs, sometimes tofu.
- Gulai itiak, duck gulai.
- Gulai jariang, jariang stinky bean gulai.
- Gulai kambiang, mutton gulai.
- Gulai kapalo capa sirah, red snapper's head gulai.
- Gulai kapalo lauak, fish head gulai.
- Gulai korma, gulai with less chili and more spices.
- Gulai limpo, gulai of bovine spleen.
- Gulai nalli, gulai of bovine bone marrow.
- Gulai tunjang, gulai of bovine foot tendons.
- Gulai talua, boiled eggs gulai.
- Gulai udang, shrimp gulai.
- Kalio, an intermediate Minangkabawi curry phase between gulai and randang hence kalio is thicker than gulai but less caramelised than randang.
- Kapitiang basauso ala Padang, seafood dish of crab served in hot and spicy Padangi sauce.
- Katupek, rice cake made from rice packed inside a diamond-shaped container of woven palm leaf pouch.
- Lamang mixture of sticky rice, coconut milk and pandan in thin bamboo (talang).
- Limbek guriang, fried catfish.
- Mutabbaq, stuffed pancake or pan-fried bread, sometimes filled with beef and scallions.
- Mutabbaq ala Kubang, Minangkabawi-style of mutabbaq from Kubang, Limo Puluah Koto, West Sumatra. It is Arab–Indian–Minangkabau fusion dish.
- Nasi ala Kapau, steamed rice topped with various choices of dishes originated from Kapau, Agam, West Sumatra.
- Nasi biriani, flavoured rice dish cooked or served with mutton, chicken, vegetable or fish curry.
- Nasi kari or nasi gulai, rice and curry.
- Nasi rameh, steamed rice served with various choices of pre-cooked dishes which is known as Nasi Padang outside of West Sumatra.
- Palai, Minangkabau variants of pepes.
- Paratto ala Cannai, an oily flatbread with a flaky crust, fried on a tabak with oil and usually served with curry or gulai.
- Paratto jalo, the name is derived from the Malayalam word parotta (oily flatbread) and native Minangkabawi word jalo (net). A special ladle with a five-hole perforation used to make the flatbread looks like a fish net. It is usually eaten as an accompaniment to a curried dish, or served as dessert with sweet durian gravy that is made from a mixture of boiled coconut milk, brown sugar and pandan leaves.
- Paru guriang, fried cow lung.
- Patai guriang, fried green stinky bean (Parkia speciosa).
- Pirikade jaguang, corn fritters.
- Pucuak Parancih tumbuak, cassava leaves in coconut milk.
- Randang, chunks of beef stewed in spicy coconut milk and chili gravy, cooked well until dried. Other than beef, randang ayam (chicken randang), randang itiak (duck randang), randang lokan (mussel randang), and number of other varieties can be found.
- Ranjuangan guriang, crispy fried Portunid crab.
- Samba lado mudo, sambal made of green chili, kaffir lime's leaf and tomatillo.
- Samba lado tanak, sambal with coconut milk, anchovies, green stinky bean and spices.
- Samba lado sirah, sambal made of red chili, garlic and shallot.
- Sarikayo, jam made from a base of coconut milk, eggs and sugar.
- Satai ala Minang, Minangkabawi-style of satay, skewered barbecued meat with thick yellow Minangkabawi satay sauce.
- Soto ala Minang, a soup of fried flattened beef.
- Soto dagiang, traditional soup mainly composed of broth, herbs and meat.
- Talua balado, fried boiled egg cooked in samba lado sirah.
- Taruang balado, fried aubergine cooked in samba lado sirah.
- Udang balado, fried shrimp cooked in samba lado sirah.

=== Snacks and desserts ===
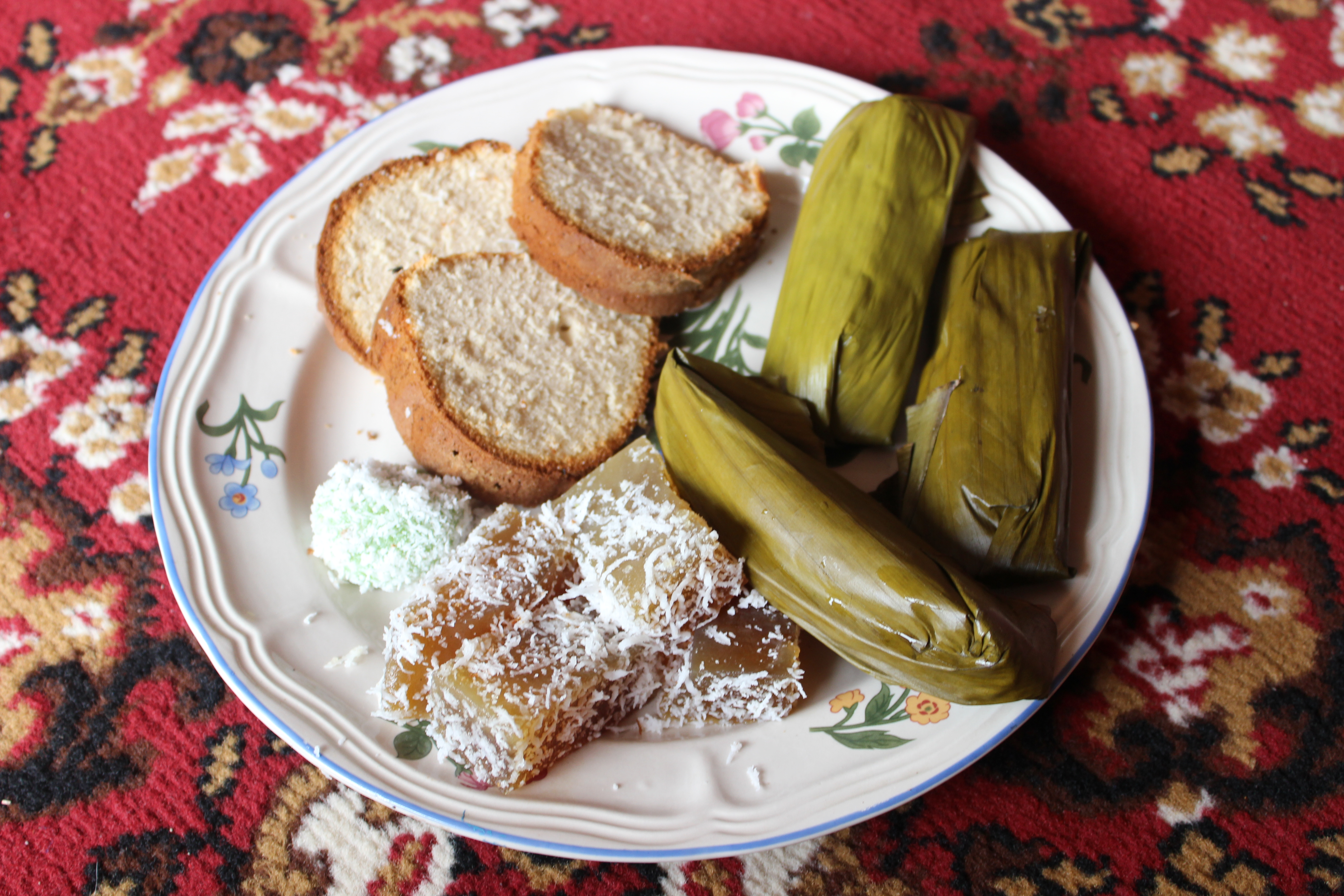
A plate of Minangkabawi snacks, usually served in weddings or family gatherings.

- Bika baka, baked batter made of coconut milk, rice flour and shredded coconut.
- Dakak-dakak, crispy fried rice flour or spiced diced cassava.
- Galamai, sweets made of rice flour, palm sugar and coconut milk. This snack similar to dodol.
- Kacimuih, shredded boiled cassava topped with shredded coconut and sugar.
- Karipiak balado, cassava crisps coated with hot and sweet chili paste.
- Karipiak kantang balado, potato crisps coated with hot and sweet chili paste.
- Karipiak sanjai, sliced cassava crisps.
- Karipiak jangek, fried bovine's (usually cow's) skin.
- Lapek sarikayo, sticky and chewy snack made from glutinous rice.
- Lopih, sweet cake made of glutinous rice, banana leaves, coconut, and palm sugar sauce.
- Paratto tissu, thinner version of the traditional Paratto ala Cannai.
- Pinukuik, traditional pancake that is made from rice flour with coconut milk or shredded coconut.
- Pinyaram, traditional cake made from mixture of white sugar or palm sugar, white rice flour or black rice, and coconut milk.
- Puttu, traditional cylindrical-shaped and green-colored steamed cake.
- Rakik, deep-fried savoury crackers.
- Rakik udang, shrimp rakik.
- Sala lauak, fried spiced fish and rice flour dough.
- Sala kapitiang, fried crab with spiced batter.
- Sala udang, fried shrimp with spiced batter.
- Tapai, fermented sticky rice.
- Wajik, diamond-shaped compressed sweet glutinous rice cake.

=== Beverages ===
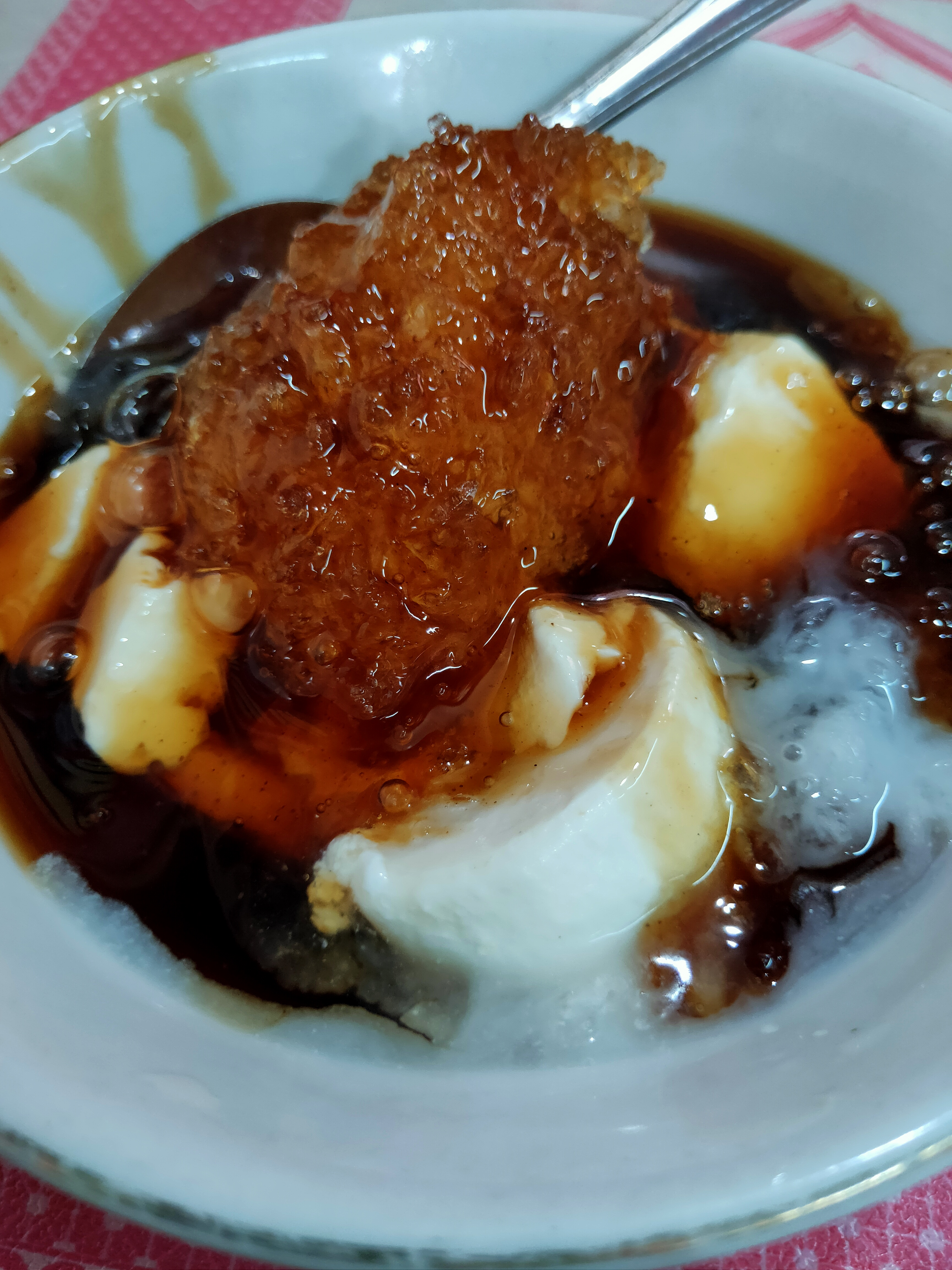
Es ampiang dadiah, Minangkabawi yogurt served with shaved ice and palm sugar.

- Cindua, sweet dessert that contains droplets of green rice flour jelly, mixed of lupis, durian, ampiang, and doused with palm sugar.
- Dadiah, fermented buffalo milk akin to yogurt.
- Es campua, cold and sweet dessert concoction of fruit cocktails, coconut, tapioca pearls, grass jellies, etc. and served in shaved ice, syrup and condensed milk.
- Es tebak, mixed of avocado, jack fruit, tebak, shredded and iced with sweet condensed milk.
- Teh talua, mixture of tea and egg.
- Teh tariak, hot milk tea beverage.

== In popular culture ==
- The Indonesian film Tabula Rasa (2014) depicts a Minang family who run a rumah makan Padang (Padang food restaurant) that hires an aspiring Papuan football player who struggles in Jakarta as their cook.

== See also ==
- Indonesian cuisine
- Malay cuisine
- Javanese cuisine
- Sundanese cuisine
- Philippine cuisine
- Thai cuisine
- Sri Owen
