= Soto padang =

Traditional Indonesian soup

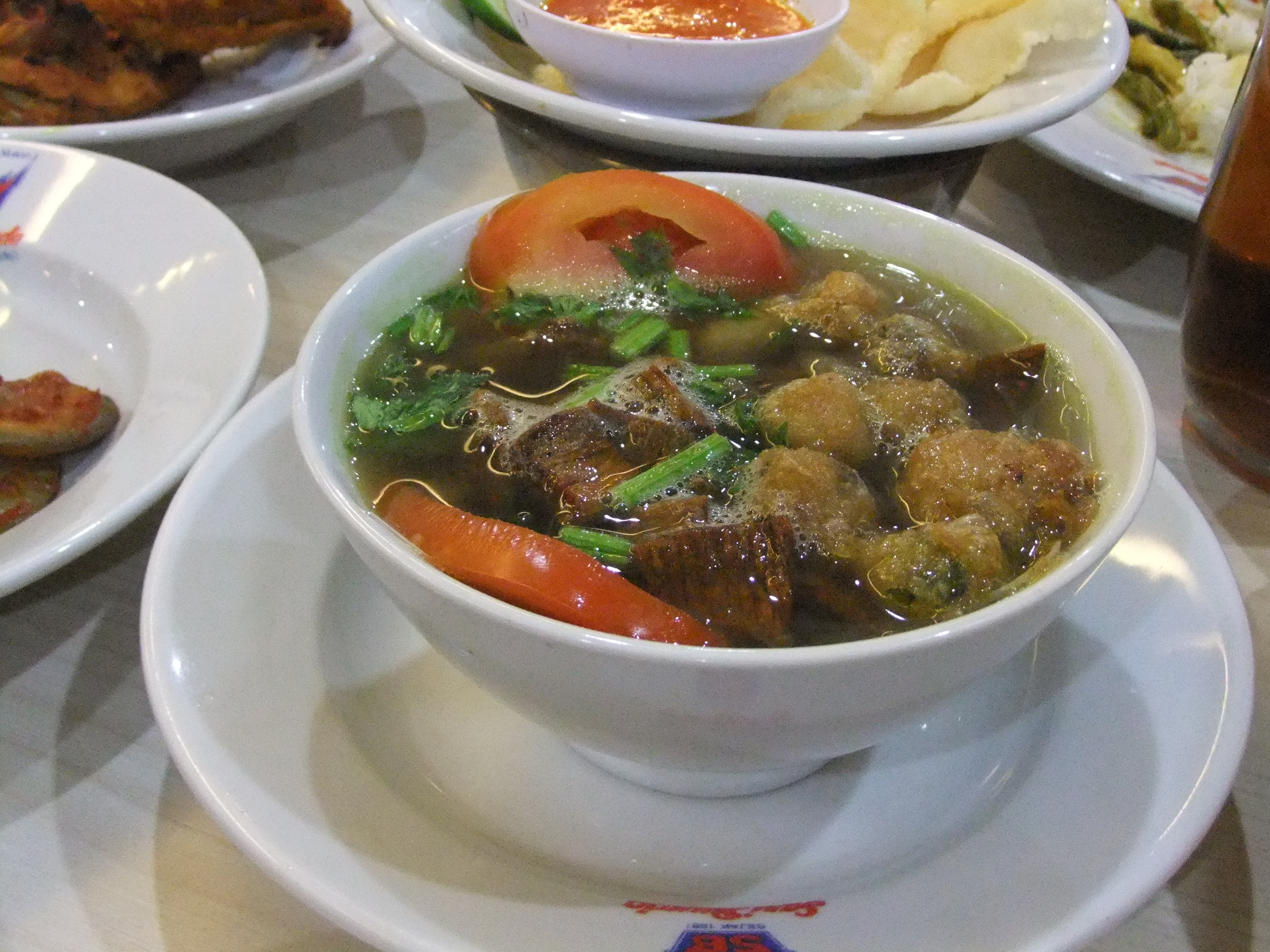
- A bowl of soto padang
- Type: Soup
- Course: Main course
- Place of origin: Indonesia
- Region or state: West Sumatra
- Created by: Minangkabau
- Serving temperature: Hot
- Main ingredients: Various traditional Indonesian chicken, beef, or offal soups

Soto padang is a kind of clear, non coconut milked soto, which usually contains beef, onion, potatoes, and white vermicelli noodles as its main ingredients. This soto is a culinary specialty originating from West Sumatra, Indonesia.

The meat used for the soto can be boiled and cut, or it can be fried until crunchy. The potatoes are boiled, then seasoned and made into small patties and then fried. Individual bowls are prepared with rice vermicelli, meat and potatoes put inside, and boiled egg can be added before the broth is poured in. Sliced celery, scallions, and fried shallot are usually added as garnishes.

In Padang City, this soto is often served for breakfast, and sometimes accompanied by the teh talua (creamed egg tea).

== See also ==
- Indonesian cuisine
- List of Indonesian soups
- Padang cuisine
- Soto
