= Nasi kari =

Indonesian curry rice

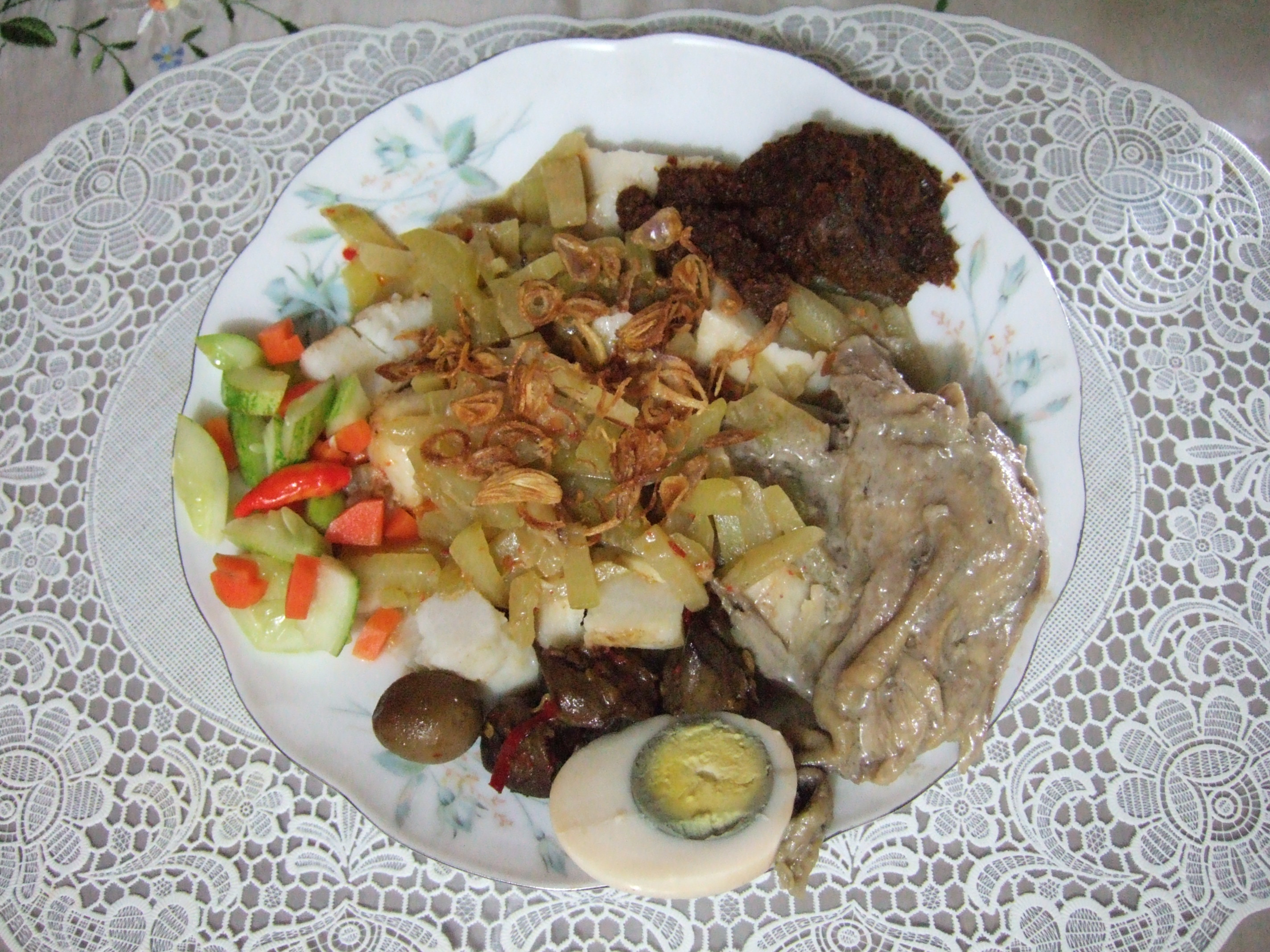
- A plate of nasi kari
- Alternative names: Nasi gulai
- Type: Curry, rice dish
- Course: Main dish
- Place of origin: Indonesia
- Region or state: Sumatra and Java
- Associated cuisine: Maritime Southeast Asia
- Created by: Indian Indonesians
- Main ingredients: Rice and curry

Nasi kari (lit. 'curry rice') is an Indian Indonesian rice dish, commonly found in Sumatran (Acehnese, Minangkabau and Malay) and Javan (Javanese) cuisines. This rice dish is popular in Sumatra and Java, Indonesia. It has regional variants across Indonesia because of the difference between curry preparations with local ingredients and traditions. An notable example is kare ayam khas Solo, which is featured in Indonesian Ramadan meal recipes suitable for breaking the fast.

== Etymology ==
The term Nasi kari translates to "curry rice" in Indonesian. The first word, Nasi means cooked rice in Malay and Indonesian. Kari has a more unique origin. Before the British colonial period, kari meant something black in color or any form of meat. The British used the latter definition of it, calling 'kari' curry to refer to meat.

== History ==
One of Nasi kari's origins come from the Peranakan community in Bagansiapiapi. Its development is unclear, either originating from the Arab-Indian-Malay spice traditions of Sumatra, or Hokkien settlers from Thailand. It traditionally consists of pork (chasiu) and duck eggs. This dish in the modern age has evolved to include beef shank and chicken eggs.

== Nutrition ==
A nutritional concern regarding nasi kari is its high saturated fat content in some variants of nasi kari. In a study regarding Nasi Kandar Chicken Curry (kari), the dishes contained high amounts of saturated fatty acids, notably lauric acid. Lauric acid is commonly found in coconut products, attributed to the used of heated coconut milk in the preparation of the dish. While the dishes contain unsaturated fatty acids, the presence of it does not eliminate heath concerns associated with saturated fat consumption.

== Composition ==
Nasi kari comprises the following:

- Steamed rice, ketupat or lontong.
- Curry, it can be rendang, gulai, opor ayam, gudeg, chicken curry, mutton curry, goat curry, shrimp curry or fish head curry.
- Sambal, spicy sauce or paste.
- Acar, traditional vegetable pickles.
- Bawang goreng, deep fried shallots.

== See also ==
- Cuisine of Indonesia
- Rendang
- Curry
