= Restoran Sederhana =

Indonesian fast food restaurant

PT. Sederhana Citra Mandiri
- Type: Private
- Industry: Restaurants
- Founded: 1972
- Founder: Bustaman
- Headquarters: Jakarta, Indonesia
- Number of locations: 100+
- Area served: Indonesia, Malaysia
- Products: Padang cuisine
- Website: restoransederhana.id

Restoran Sederhana is an Indonesian fast-food restaurant chain serving Padang cuisine which started in 1972, with over 100 locations across Indonesia and branches in Malaysia.

== History ==
The chain emerged from a small roadside stall at Bendungan Hilir opened in January 1972 by Bustaman, a migrant to Jakarta from Tanah Datar Regency. By 1975, Bustaman had managed to open a second location in Roxy, West Jakarta, but named the location there "Singgalang Jaya" (after Mount Singgalang) instead of Sederhana. Between 1975 and 1984, Bustaman opened a further five Singgalang Jaya branches across Jakarta. In 1978, however, after the Roxy branch was closed due to new property development, a new branch was opened in Rawamangun, East Jakarta, under the Sederhana brand. Bustaman operated ten branches by 1995. The Rawamangun branch is today the chain's flagship location.

The first Sederhana location outside of Jakarta was in Surabaya, opened in 1996. From this branch in Surabaya, the first franchise investor (a second branch in Surabaya) was found in 1998, and the brand began to open locations outside of Java through franchising. The company supplied spice mixes to its branches from a central kitchen in Ciledug. The Sederhana trademark was registered in 2000, and the trademark was enforced in 2014 against a former Sederhana investor who split away from the firm and started a separate restaurant chain in Bintaro.

== Operations ==
According to a 2008 Jakarta Post study, Sederhana was the most popular fast food chain in Indonesia. A 2018 study by Roy Morgan Research found that Sederhana was still the most popular restaurant chain in Indonesia with 28.4 million customers in 2017–2018, due to its popularity outside the Greater Jakarta area where international fast food chains such as KFC were more popular. In late 2020, there were over 100 locations in the chain, including three locations in Malaysia, with 3,000 employees.

== Gallery ==
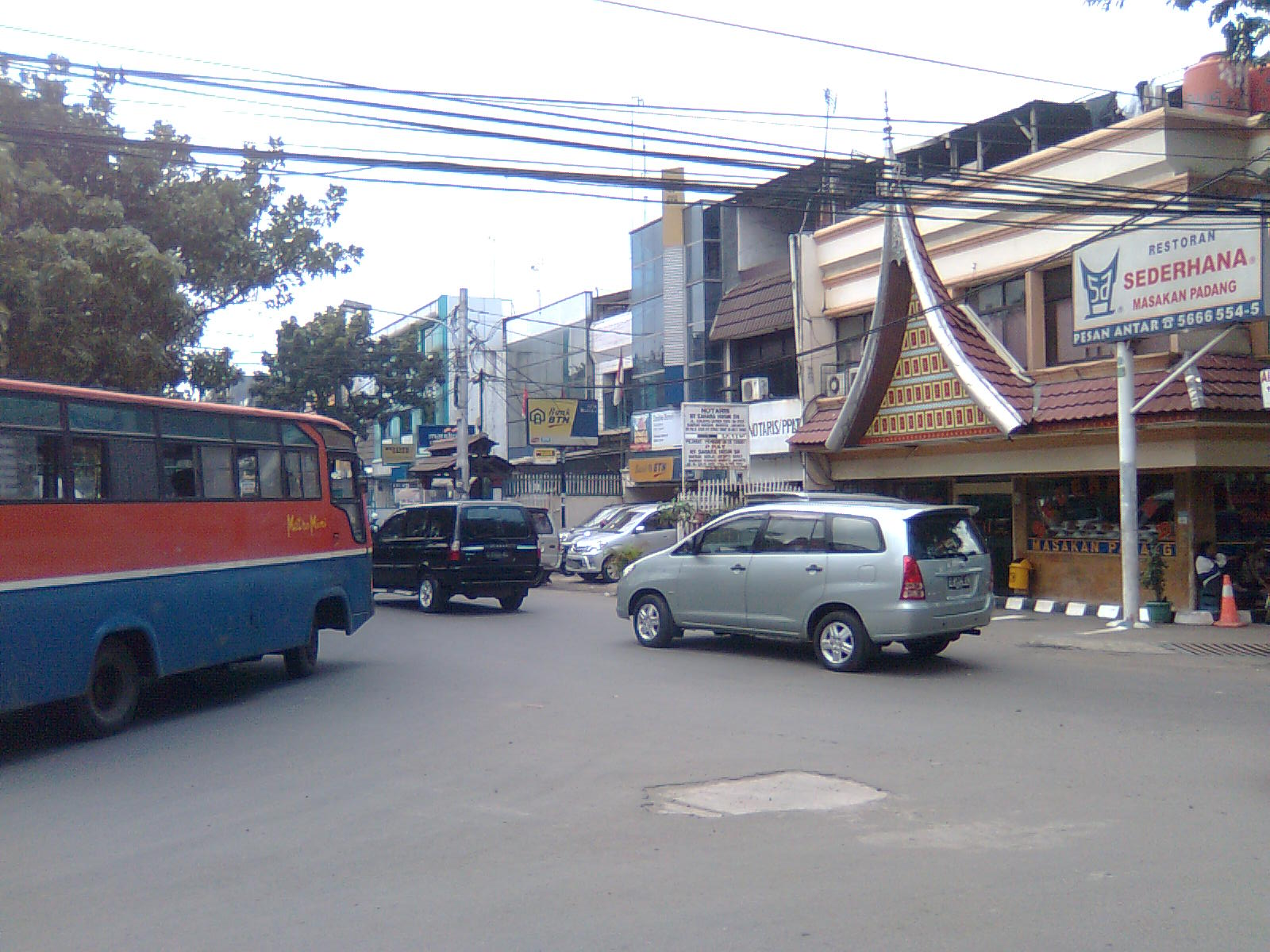
A Sederhana location in West Jakarta

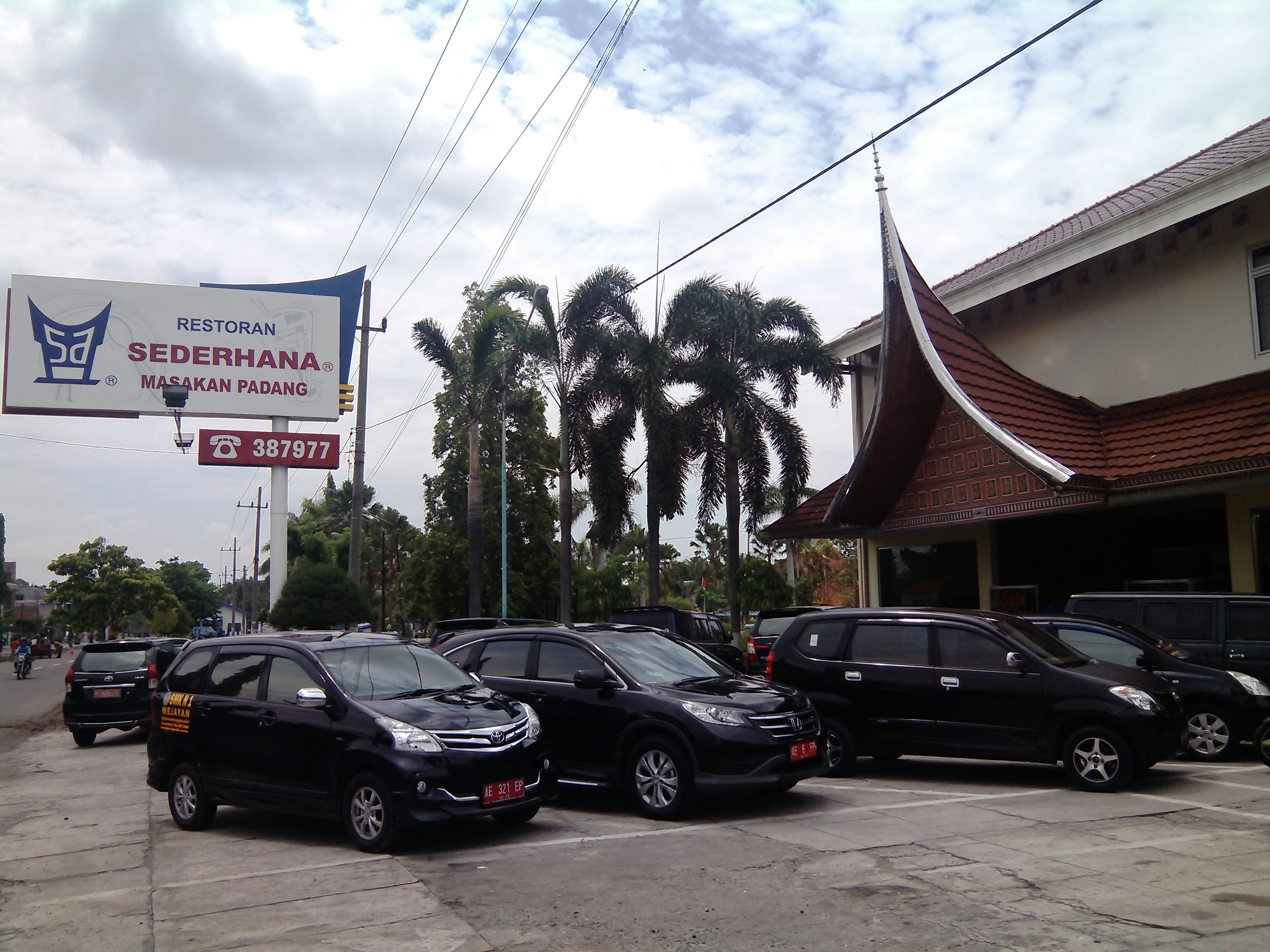
A Sederhana location in Madiun
