= Udang balado =

Indonesian spicy shrimp

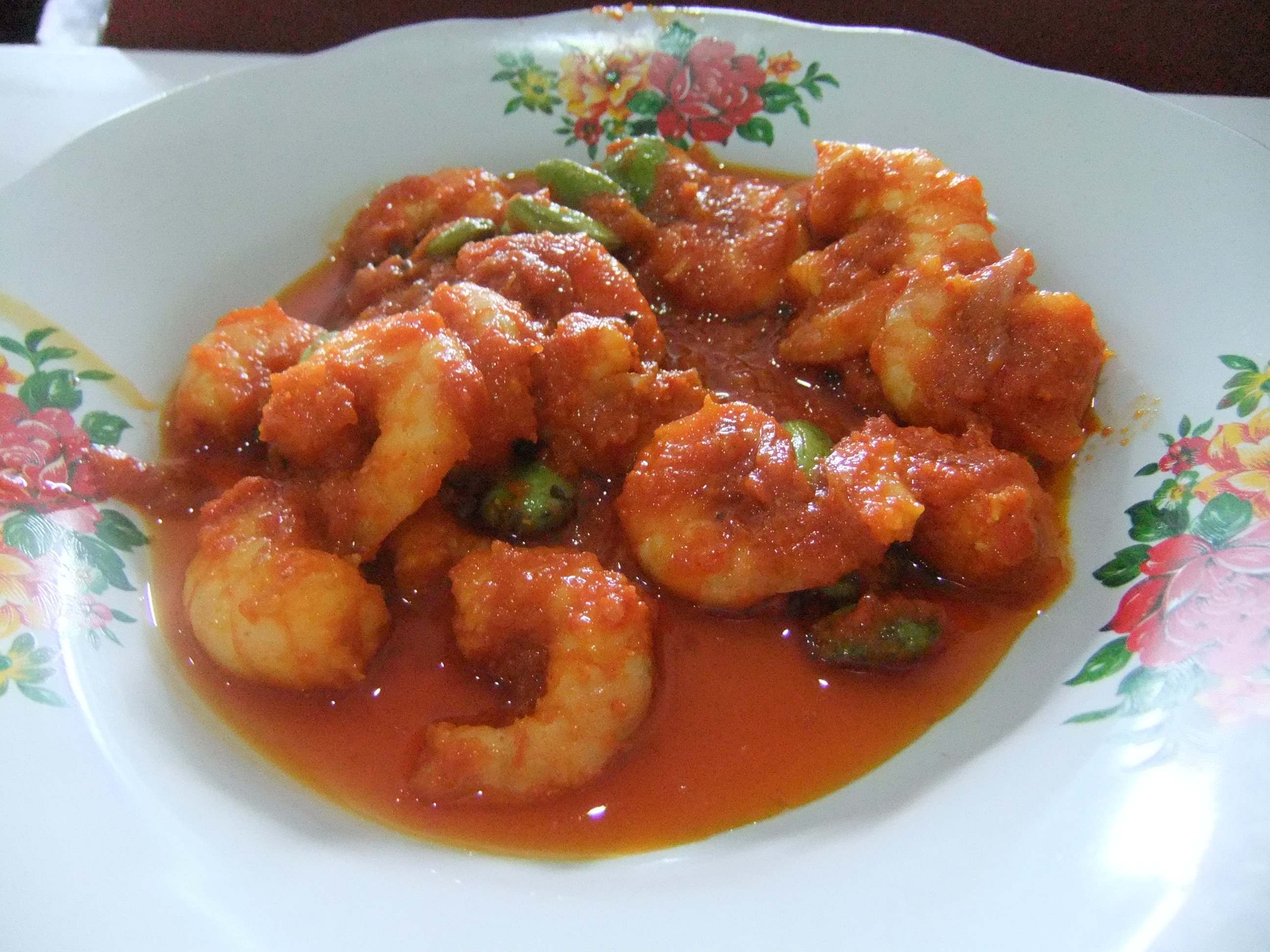
- Udang balado Padang-style prawns in spicy sambal or balado sauce
- Alternative names: Sambal goreng udang
- Course: Main course
- Place of origin: Indonesia
- Serving temperature: Hot
- Main ingredients: Shrimp (peeled or unpeeled) in hot and spicy sambal spice mixture with a lot of red chili pepper

Udang balado or sambal goreng udang is a hot and spicy shrimp dish commonly found in Indonesian cuisine. It is made of shrimp, either peeled or unpeeled, stir-fried in hot and spicy sambal paste in a small amount of cooking oil.

== Ingredients ==
The bumbu (spice mixture) used in sambal shrimp includes shallot, garlic, candlenut, ginger, shrimp paste, turmeric, galangal, and red chili pepper; all mixed and ground with salt and water. Additionally, bruised lemongrass, daun salam (Indonesian bayleaf), and kaffir lime leaves are then added and stir-fried in cooking oil (usually palm or coconut oil) until the spice mixture releases its aroma. The cleaned shrimps, either with or without the peel, are stir-fried together until they are cooked. Additional ingredient might be added, such as green beans and quail eggs, fried diced potato, tofu, or green stinky beans.

== Variants ==
Shrimp cooked in sambal chili paste is quite common in various cooking traditions of Indonesia; from Minangkabau (Padang) to Malay, Sundanese, Javanese, Balinese and Manado. In Minangkabau tradition it is known as balado udang and considered as one variant of the spicy balado dishes.

== See also ==
- Dabu-dabu
- List of shrimp dishes
- Rica-rica
