= Lupis (food) =

Sweet Indonesian rice dessert

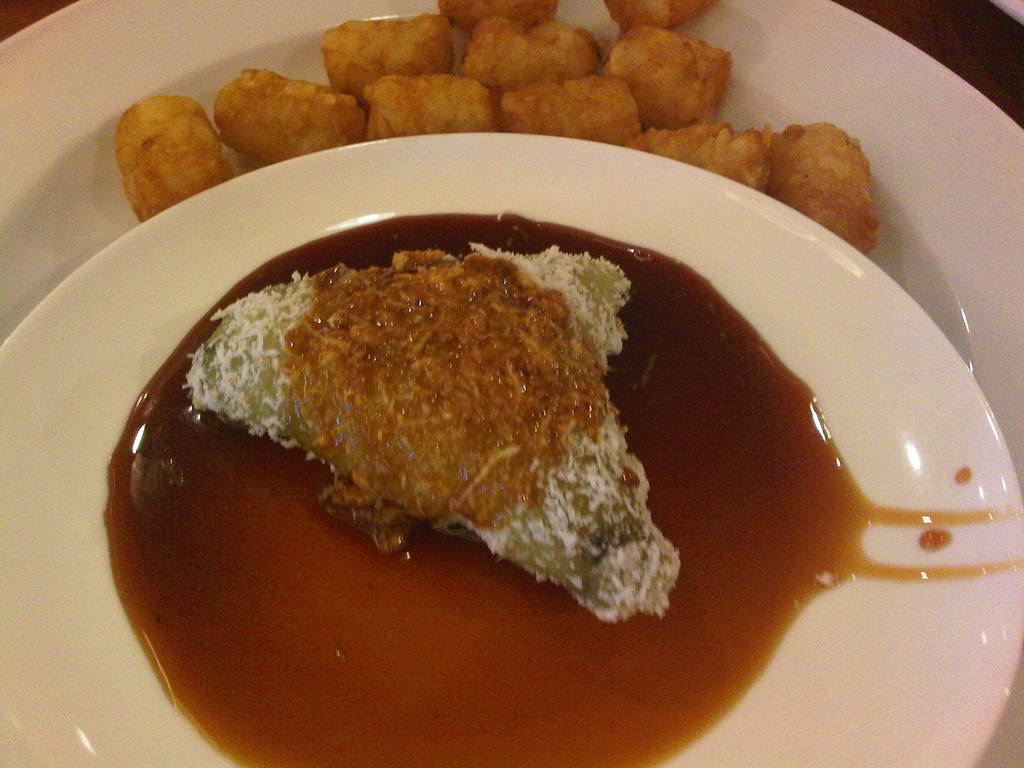
- Triangle-shaped Lupis unwrapped and sprinkled with coconut flakes served after being set in coconut sugar syrup.
- Alternative names: Lopis
- Type: Kue
- Course: Dessert
- Place of origin: Indonesia
- Region or state: Southeast Asia
- Main ingredients: Glutinous rice, coconut, palm sugar syrup
- Other information: Pronounced lu:pɪs

Lupis (sometimes lopis) is an Indonesian traditional sweet cake made of glutinous rice, banana leaves, coconut, and brown sugar sauce. Lupis is one of many glutinous rice desserts from Indonesia. Lupis are sometimes cylindrically shaped like Lontong, or shaped like a triangle. Lupis is usually eaten with thick palm sugar syrup and with shredded coconut toppings. Often eaten at breakfast or as a side dish during the evening, lupis is often sold at traditional marketplaces throughout Indonesia and is a popular food found nationwide, but especially in middle and eastern Java as well as West Sumatra. Lupis is one of the top desserts that tourists who visit Purwokerto in Java seek.

== Cooking method ==
Lupis is made by first soaking glutinous rice in water, salt, and lime juice. After draining the water, the soaked glutinous rice is moved onto banana leaves in single-serving-size portions to be wrapped for shaping. The wrapped rice triangles are then put aside for the creation of the syrup condiment. Coconut sugar is dissolved in water and brought to a boil, and left to thicken. Grated coconut is then sprinkled on top of the unwrapped lupis and drizzled with coconut sugar syrup to be served.

== See also ==
- Kue lapis
- Lapis legit
- Seri muka
