= Ayam pop =

Indonesian chicken dish

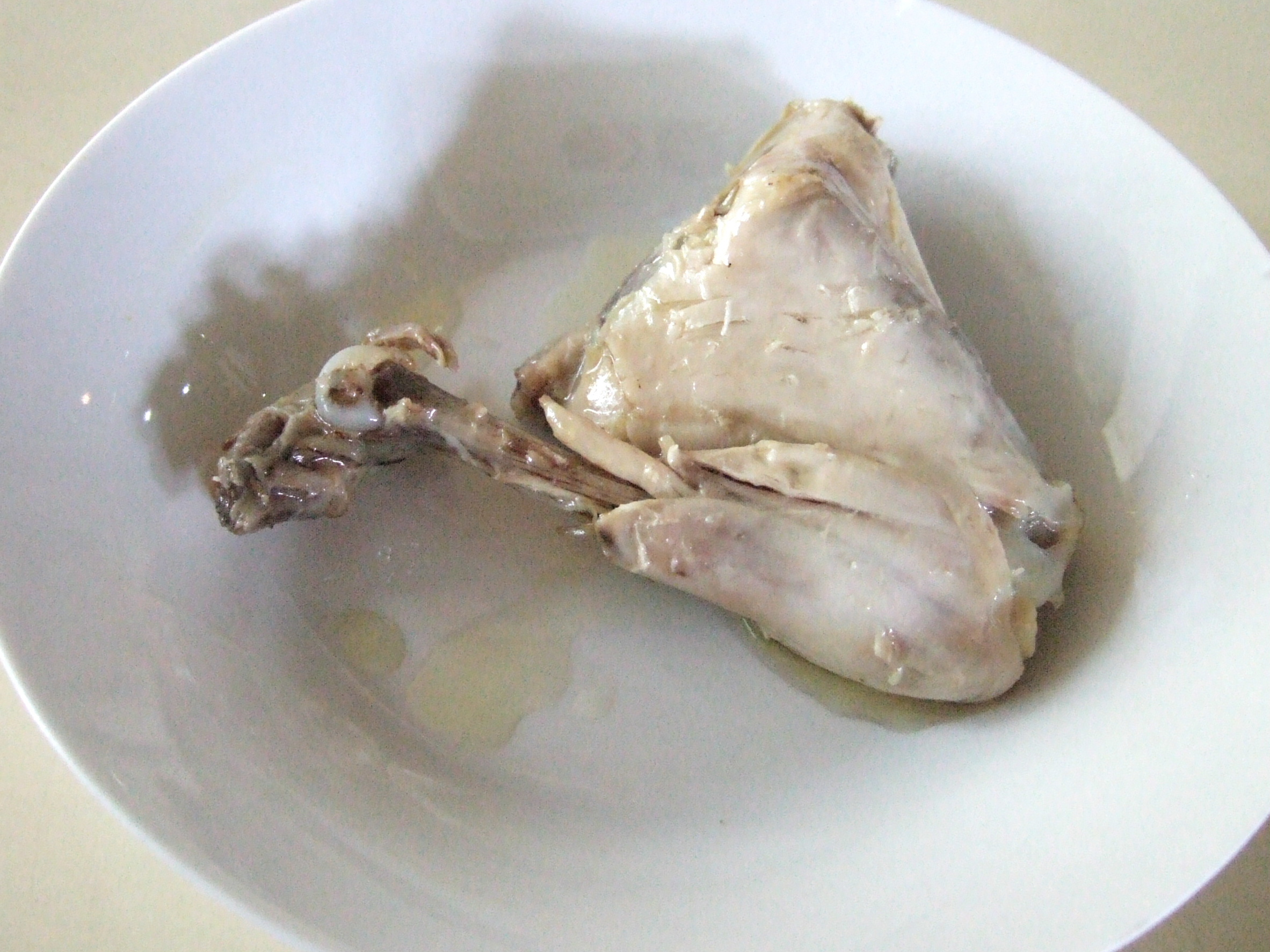
- Light-colored ayam pop
- Course: Main course
- Place of origin: Indonesia
- Region or state: Sumatra
- Associated cuisine: Indonesia
- Created by: Minangkabau
- Serving temperature: Hot

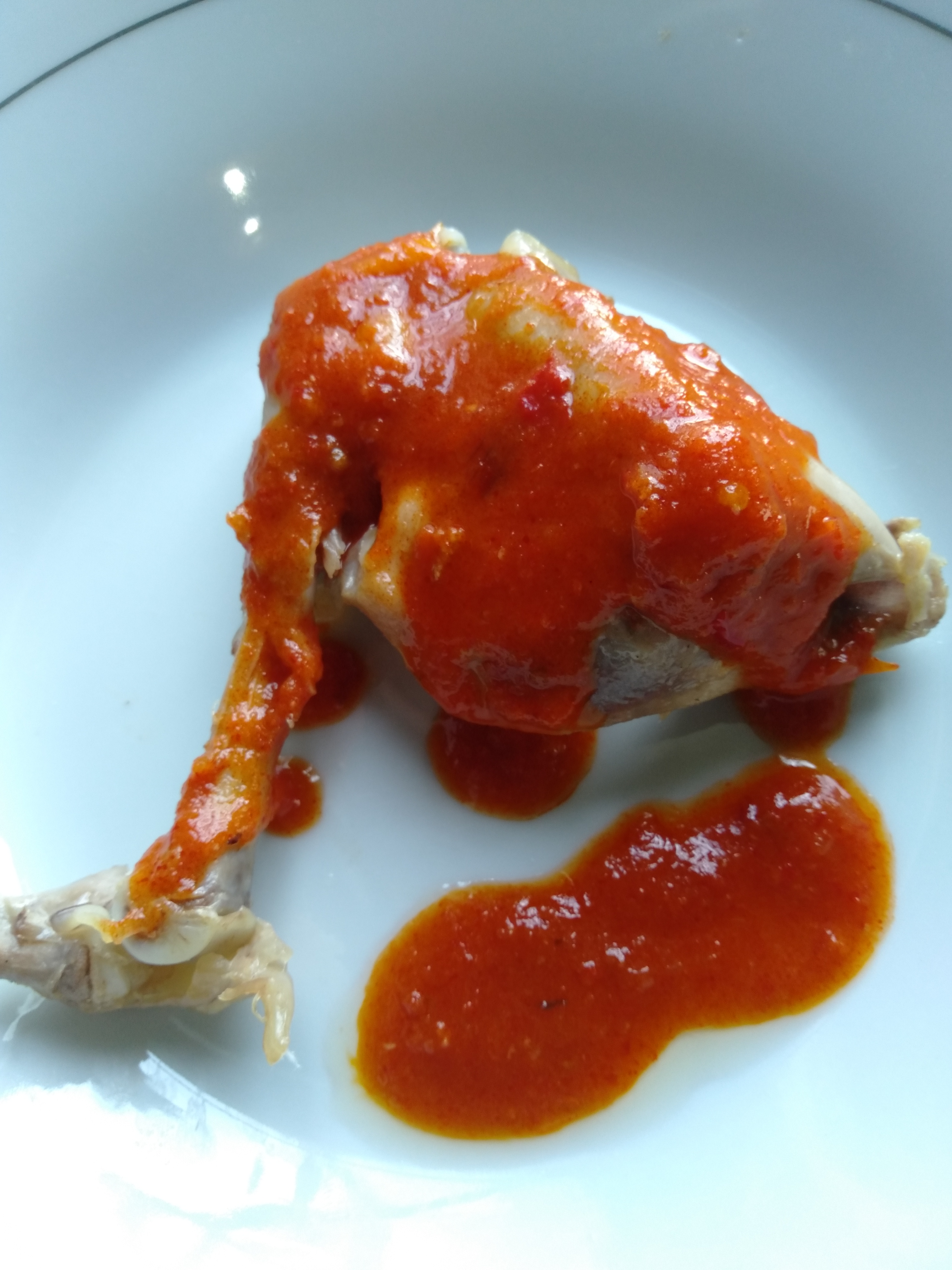
Ayam pop with sauce/sambal

Ayam pop is a fried chicken dish originating from Minangkabau cuisine commonly found in Indonesia, consisting of chicken deep fried in oil. The dish contains skinless pale fried chicken that has been boiled or steamed prior to frying. Although ayam pop is identified as ayam goreng (fried chicken), ayam pop is different from common ayam goreng. While fried chicken is golden brown, ayam pop is light-colored.

== Etymology ==
The name of the dish was inspired by the pop music genre that was dominant during the 1970s when the dish was named.

== History ==
The dish is said to originate from Bukittinggi, West Sumatra, Indonesia. There are 2 conflicting origin stories of the dish. One story states that the dish originates from the restaurant Family Benteng, which was located next to Fort de Kock, and was first introduced in their menu around the mid-1950s. Another story states that it originates from the restaurant Simpang Raya which opened in 1969. The dish became a favorite with Chinese Indonesians in Bukittinggi at the time because the pale white chicken pop resembled Hainan chicken which is a typical Chinese boiled chicken dish.

== See also ==
- Cuisine of Indonesia
- Minangkabau cuisine
- Ayam goreng
- List of chicken dishes
