= Shrimp curry =

Indonesian, Indo-Portuguese and Thai curry dish

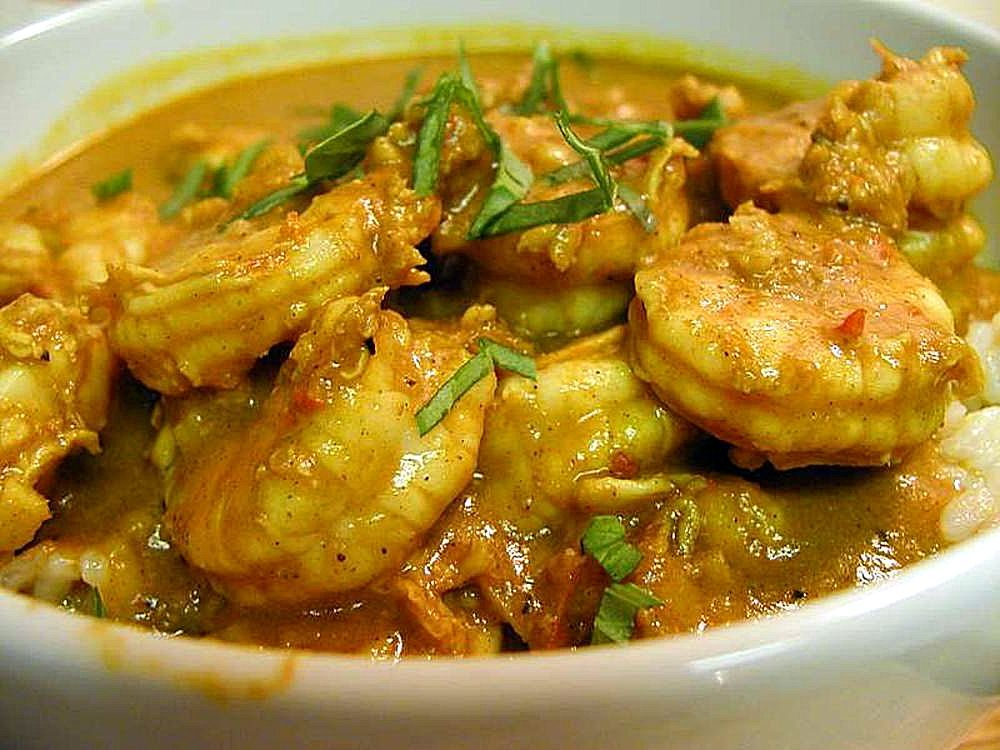
- Alternative names: Prawn curry
- Region or state: Southeast Asia, Lusophone
- Associated cuisine: Burmese, Indonesian, Indo-Portuguese, Mozambican, and Thai cuisines
- Main ingredients: Shrimp and aromatics

Shrimp curry (Portuguese: caril de camarão, Indonesian: 'gulai udang or kari udang), also known as prawn curry, is a typical curry dish of Burmese cuisine, Indonesian cuisine in Indonesia (Aceh and West Sumatra), Indo-Portuguese cuisine in India (Goa) and Portugal, Mozambican cuisine in Mozambique and Thai cuisine in Thailand (Phuket).

As the name suggests, this is a dish prepared with shrimp (locally also referred to as prawn), typically cooked in a thick sauce of a yellow hue. Among other ingredients are grated coconut, turmeric, cumin, coriander, chilli, onion, garlic, tamarind, vinegar, sugar and salt. It is usually accompanied by white rice.

In Burmese cuisine, prawn sibyan (Burmese: ပုစွန်ဆီပြန်) is a traditional Burmese curry of whole prawns cooked in a sibyan gravy of aromatics and shrimp oil (Burmese: ပုစွန်ဆီ), which is similar to tomalley.

In Indonesia, this dish is known and quite popular in Sumatra of Acehnese, Minangkabau and Malay cuisine.

In Portugal, the dish can be found on the menus of Goan and Mozambican restaurants.

== See also ==
- Caril de camarão com quiabos (shrimp curry with okra) in the Portuguese Wikipedia
- Curry
- List of shrimp dishes
