= Teh talua =

Indonesian tea beverage

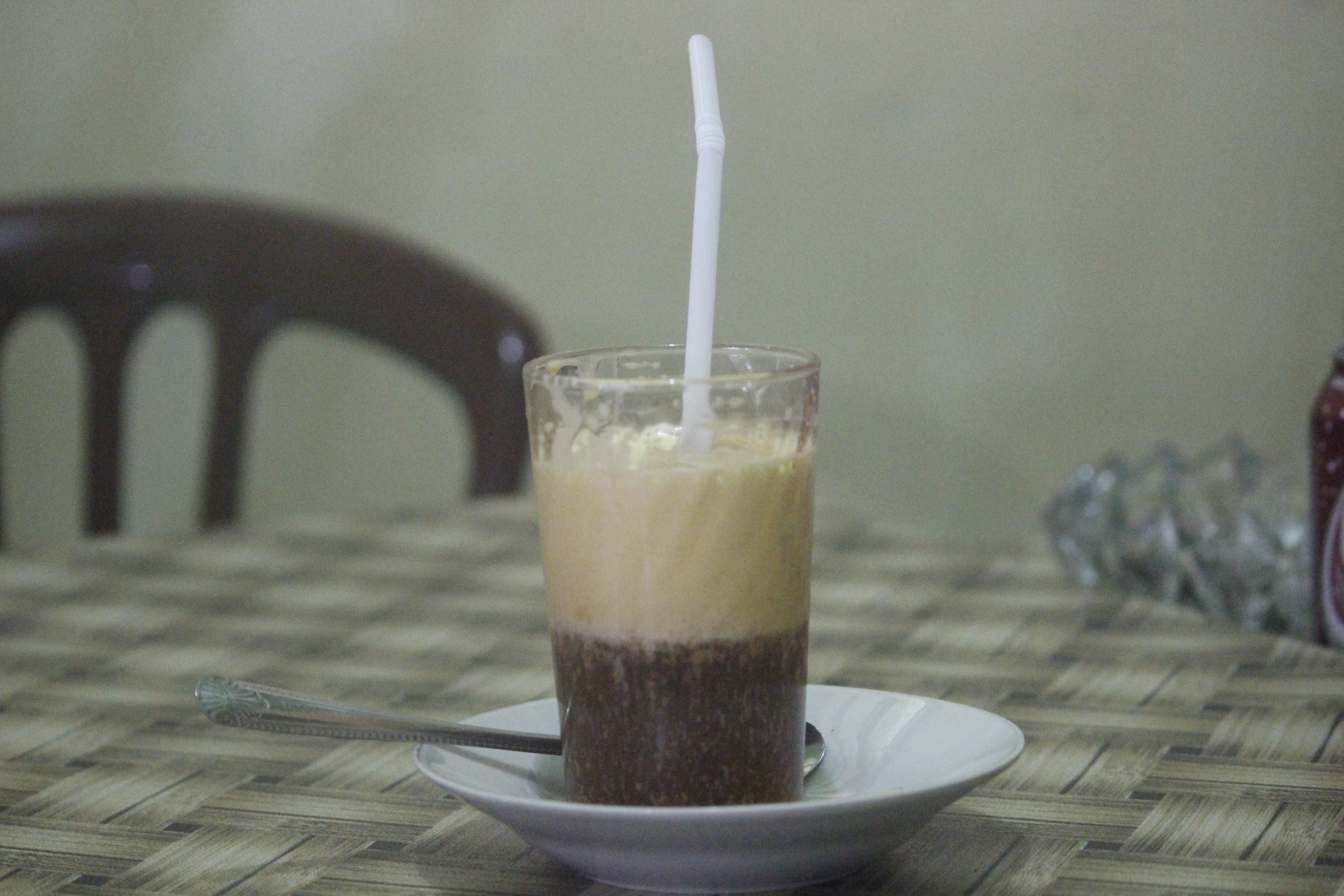
Teh talua

Teh talua or teh telur (egg tea) is a tea beverage from West Sumatra, Indonesia. The tea is unique due to its use of egg yolk in its preparation. Chicken or duck egg can be used to prepare the tea. Other ingredients, in addition to tea and egg yolk, include sugar and calamondin. In addition, there are many other variations of egg tea, including different types of milk tea and silky smooth egg cream yuanyang tea, made with similar ingredients and methods.

A traditional method of preparing this drink involves stirring the egg yolk and two spoons of sugar or condensed milk in a glass until a batter is developed. Hot tea is then gradually stirred into the batter to combine the two elements. Calamondin juice can be then added according to taste, to remove any remaining unpleasant smell.

== See also ==
- List of hot beverages
- List of Indonesian beverages
- List of egg drinks
  - Eggnog
  - Egg coffee
