= List of Indonesian dishes =

Cuisine of Indonesia

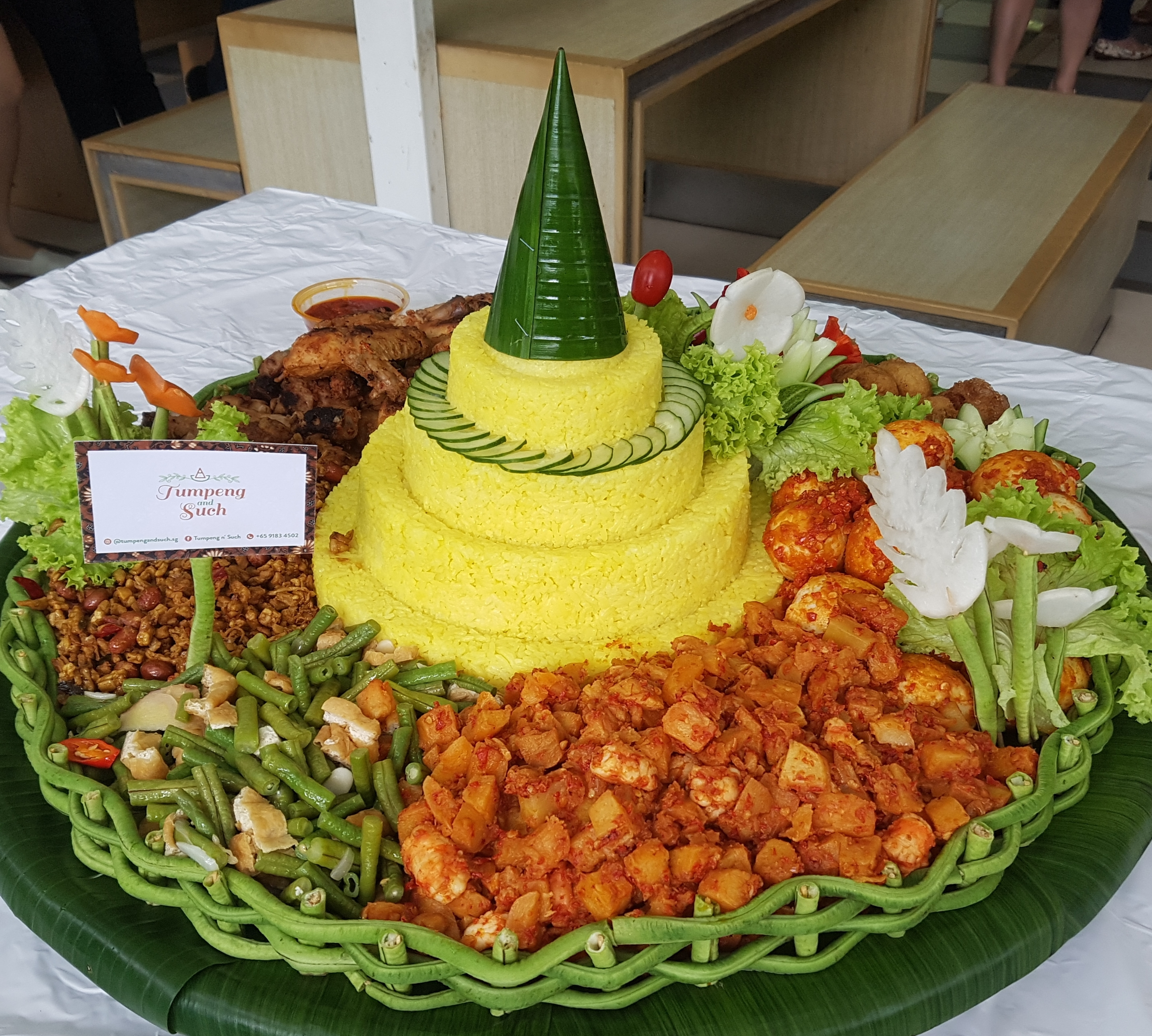
Tumpeng nasi kuning, cone-shaped yellow rice surrounded by assorted Indonesian dishes, usually served for celebrations and ceremonies

This is a list of selected dishes found in Indonesian cuisine.

== Staple foods ==
Name	Image	Origin/Popularity	Type	Description
Bihun		Nationwide	Rice noodles	A thin form of rice noodles (rice vermicelli).
Burasa		Makassar, South Sulawesi	Rice cake	Rice and coconut milk cake wrapped in banana leaves.
Ketan		Nationwide	Rice dumpling or rice cake	It is made from sticky rice.
Ketupat		Nationwide	Rice dumpling or rice cake	It is made from rice packed inside a diamond-shaped container of woven palm leaf pouch.
Kwetiau		Nationwide	Rice noodles	A type of noodle made from rice with sprawl-shaped.
Lemang		Malay and Minangkabau	Rice dish	A traditional Malay food made of glutinous rice, coconut milk and salt, cooked in a hollowed bamboo stick lined with banana leaves in order to prevent the rice from sticking to the bamboo.
Lontong		Nationwide	Rice dumpling or rice cake	Pressed rice cake inside banana wrapping.
Mi		Nationwide	Noodles	Food made from unleavened dough which is rolled flat and cut, stretched or extruded, into long strips or strings.
Nasi gurih		Java and Aceh	Rice dish	Made by cooking mixture of rice and sticky rice soaked in coconut milk instead of water, along with salt, lemongrass, Indian bay leaf, and pandan leaves to add aroma.
Nasi jagung		Madura and East Nusa Tenggara	Cornmeal	Boiled 'rice' substitution made from cornmeal, common in drier parts of Indonesia.
Nasi putih		Nationwide	Steamed rice	Steamed rice as staple food.
Papeda		Eastern Indonesia	Congee	Sago congee, the staple food of Eastern Indonesia.
Tamboyo		Nias, North Sumatra	Rice dumpling or Rice cake	Similar to ketupat, use sticky rice instead, cooked in coconut milk.
Tiwul		Java	Cassava	Boiled 'rice' substitution made from dried cassava.

== Main dishes ==
=== Curries ===
Name	Image	Origin/Popularity	Type	Description
Gudeg		Yogyakarta and Central Java	Curry dish	Unripe jackfruit boiled for hours in palm sugar and coconut milk, added with spices for its sweet flavour and brown colour. Served with rice, boiled egg, chicken, and sambal krechek.
Gulai		Minangkabau / Nationwide	Curry dish	Indonesian curry characterised with yellow colour from turmeric and coconut milk. The most popular variants of gulai are gulai ayam, gulai kambing, and gulai otak.
Gulai ayam		Nationwide	Curry dish, chicken dish	Chicken cooked in a spicy, rich, yellowish, curry-like sauce called gulai.
Kalio		Minangkabau	Curry dish, meat dish	A type of rendang that is cooked for a shorter period of time and much of the coconut milk liquid has not evaporated.
Kari ayam		Nationwide	Curry dish, chicken dish	A type of curry dish cooked using chicken and spices.
Kari domba		Malay and Minangkabau	Curry dish, meat dish	A type of curry dish cooked using lamb or mutton. It is popular during Eid ul-Adha.
Kari kambing		Nationwide	Curry dish, meat dish	A type of curry dish prepared with goat meat. Usually served with roti canai. It is popular during Eid ul-Adha.
Kari kepala ikan		Malay	Curry dish, seafood	A type of curry dish cooked using head of a red snapper, influenced by Indian and Peranakan cuisine.
Kari rajungan		East Java	Curry dish, seafood	A type of curry dish cooked using portunidae.
Kari udang		Sumatra	Curry dish, seafood	A type of curry dish cooked using shrimp.
Kuwah eungkôt yèe		Aceh	Curry dish, seafood	A shark gulai cooked using herbs and spices that are very distinctive, such as temurui leaves and kaffir lime leaves.
Kuwah pliek u		Aceh	Curry dish	An Acehnese gulai-like dish cooked using oilcake, melinjo, long beans, peanuts, papaya leaves, cassava leaves, kecombrang bamboo shoots, snails, and spices.
Opor ayam		Nationwide	Curry dish, chicken dish, meat soup	Chicken cooked in coconut milk. Traditionally consumed with ketupat during the Eid ul-Fitr celebration in many parts of Indonesia.
Rendang		Minangkabau/ Nationwide	Curry dish, meat dish	Chunks of beef stewed in coconut milk and spicy thick curry gravy. It is usually served during Eid ul-Fitr.
Tempoyak ikan patin		Palembang	Curry dish, seafood	Catfish served in sweet and spicy fermented durian curry.

=== Meals ===
Name	Image	Origin/Popularity	Type	Description
Arsik		Batak, North Sumatra	Spicy fish	Mandailing-style spiced carp with torch ginger and andaliman.
Ayam bakar		Nationwide	Chicken dish (grilled chicken)	Charcoal-grilled spiced chicken.
Ayam bumbu rujak		Javanese	Chicken dish	Grilled or stir-fried chicken served with a spicy-sweet Rujak sauce.
Ayam cincane		Kalimantan	Chicken dish	Grilled chicken with spices.
Ayam geprek		Javanese	Chicken dish (fried chicken)	Crispy battered fried chicken crushed and mixed with hot and spicy sambal.
Ayam goreng		Nationwide	Chicken dish (fried chicken)	Spiced chicken fried in coconut oil.
Ayam goreng kalasan		Kalasan, Yogyakarta	Chicken dish (fried chicken)	Fried free-range chicken with kremes (crispy fried granules).
Ayam kecap		Java	Chicken dish	Chicken simmered or braised in sweet soy sauce.
Ayam kodok		Nationwide	Chicken dish	A stuffed and roasted chicken. Prepared by deboning a chicken, and then stuffing it with a mixture of seasoned meat and vegetables, and a hard boiled egg. The chicken is then optionally steamed before it is roasted. Usually served during Christmas.
Ayam pansuh		Kalimantan	Chicken dish	A chicken meat cooked in bamboo stalk, filled with water (which will later be the soup), seasonings and covered with tapioca leaves from the cassava plant.
Ayam penyet		Javanese	Chicken dish (fried chicken)	Fried chicken dish consisting of fried chicken that is smashed with the pestle against mortar to make it softer, served with sambal, slices of cucumbers, fried tofu and tempeh.
Ayam percik		Malay	Chicken dish (grilled chicken)	Grilled chicken with a spicy, curry-like sauce.
Ayam pop		Minangkabau	Chicken dish	Padang-style skinless pale fried chicken, served with distinct sambal.
Ayam rica-rica		Minahasan	Chicken dish	Chicken dish served with rica-rica condiment.
Ayam taliwang		Lombok, West Nusa Tenggara	Chicken dish (roasted chicken)	Grilled or fried chicken with a sambal sauce.
Ayam tandori		Indian Indonesian	Chicken dish (roasted chicken)	Roasted chicken marinated in yoghurt and spices in a tandoor.
Ayam tangkap		Aceh	Chicken dish	Traditional fried chicken served with leaves such as temurui leaves and pandan leaves that are roughly chopped and fried crispy.
Babi guling		Bali and Minahasa	Roasted meat	Balinese cuisine-style roast pork; comparable to Hawaiian luau-style pig. In Minahasa, North Sulawesi it is called babi putar.
Babi kecap		Chinese Indonesian	Braised meat	Braised pork with sweet soy sauce.
Babi panggang		Batak, Balinese, and Indo	Roasted pork	Pork roasted in light spices and chopped, usually served with Batak style sambal and sayur daun singkong (cassava leaf vegetables).
Bandeng presto		Javanese	Seafood	A pressure cooked milkfish that soften the finer fish bones. The pressure cooking also help the spices to seep into the flesh of milkfish perfectly.
Bebek goreng		Nationwide, especially popular in East Java and Bali	Fried duck	Traditional seasoned fried duck, served with sambal hot and spicy chili paste.
Betutu		Bali and West Nusa Tenggara	Roasted poultry	Poultry or duck filled with spicy seasonings, roasted usually for at least 8 hours.
Bistik jawa		Javanese	Beefsteak	Javanese beef steak, a European-influenced dish. The dish consists of beef tenderloin braised with sweet soy sauce, Worcestershire sauce, vinegar, garlic, nutmeg, and black pepper. It is usually served with carrots, string beans, tomatoes, hard-boiled eggs, fried potatoes, and sweet-and-sour mayonnaise on the side. This dish is similar to selat solo.
Bola ikan		Nationwide	Common food	Small balls that were made from fish.
Botok or bobotok		Java	Shredded coconut	Made from shredded coconut flesh which has been squeezed of its coconut milk, often mix with other ingredients such as vegetables or fish, and wrapped in banana leaf and steamed.
Botok tawon		Banyuwangi, East Java	Insect dish	A type of botok that made from bee larvae.
Brengkes tempoyak iwak lais		Palembang	Fish dish	Lais fish seasoned with tempoyak fermented durian sauce, cooked inside banana package.
Buntil		Java	Fish dish	Grated coconut mixed with anchovies and spices, wrapped in papaya, cassava, or taro leaves, then boiled in coconut milk and spice.
Burgo		Palembang, South Sumatra	Pancake	A folded rice pancake served in savoury whitish coconut milk-based soup.
Cakalang fufu		Manado, North Sulawesi	Grilled smoked fish	Grilled smoked tuna skipjack fish skewered with bamboo.
Chai tow kway		Chinese Indonesian	Dim sum	A type of dim sum with main ingredients steamed rice flour and shredded white daikon.
Cincalok		Malay	Fermented food	Fermented small shrimps or krill.
Cumi asin		Nationwide	Squid dish	Firefly squid seasoned with salt.
Cumi balado		Nationwide	Squid dish	Firefly squid in balado sauce.
Dengke mas na niura		Batak	Fish dish	Na niura fish cooked by fermenting by main spices namely asam batak and kecombrang. This food tastes like fresh fish but without a fishy odor. Naura becomes delicious because of spices itself.
Empal gepuk		West Java	Meat	Beef shank smashed until soft then soaked in coconut milk. It is then fried when made to order.
Garang asem		Javanese	Chicken dish	Chicken dish cooked using banana leaves and dominated by sour and spicy flavor.
Haisom cah jamur		Chinese Indonesian	Seafood	Sea cucumber stir fried with mushroom and vegetables.
Hambae nititi		Nias, North Sumatra	Seafood	Crab meat mixed with shaved coconut, cooked with coconut milk until dry.
Holat		Mandailing, North Sumatra	Seafood	Grilled fish served with sauce derived from shaved bark of the balakka (Phyllantum emblica) tree
Iga babi		Balinese	Roasted meat	Balinese pork ribs.
Iga penyet		Java	Fried ribs	Fried prised beef spare ribs with chili shrimp sauce (terasi).
Ikan asin		Nationwide	Salted dried fish	Salted and sun-dried fishes of various species. It is often served accompanied with steamed rice and sambal chili paste.
Ikan bakar		Nationwide	Grilled fish	Charcoal-grilled spiced fish/seafood.
Ikan goreng		Nationwide	Fried fish	Spiced fish/seafood deep fried in coconut oil.
Ikan kuah asam		Manado, North Sulawesi	Spicy and sour fish dish	Seafood fish (usually red snapper or trevally) cooked with Manadonese sour and spicy sauce/soup. This dish is similar to Woku.
Kepiting saus padang		Nationwide, but especially Minangkabau	Seafood	Crab served in hot and spicy padang sauce.
Kepiting saus tiram		Nationwide, but especially Chinese Indonesian	Seafood	Crab served in savoury oyster sauce, garlic, ginger, and scallion.
Krechek		Java	Spicy stew	Spicy stew made from krupuk kulit (skin cracker), potato, and soy beans.
Krengsengan		Java	Meat dish (usually Mutton)	Mutton sautee with sweet soy sauce and petis udang, the Indonesian translation for (black shrimp paste).
Laksan		Palembangese	Fishcake	Dish made from sago and fish. This dish made in an oval shape with almost pempek flavor, but served with coconut milk sauce.
Lawar		Bali	Vegetable and meat dish	A traditional Balinese cuisine dish served with rice and other dishes. It consists of shredded unripe jackfruit, young banana flower, a liberal amount of pork rind bits, raw pig blood. These are mashed with a plethora of herbs such as lemon grass, kaffir lime leaves, shallots, and garlic.
Na tinombur		Tapanuli, North Sumatra	Fish dish	Catfish or fish that is processed mujahir burned and served with chili sauce. This dish is similar to pecel lele.
Ni'owuru		Nias, North Sumatra	Salted Pork	Salted pork for longer storage
Ni unago		Nias, North Sumatra	Smoked meat	Smoked pork, chicken, or fish, usually 12–18 hours
Paniki		Manado, North Sulawesi	Roasted meat, exotic food	Bat cooked in Minahasan-style.
Pannenkoek or panekuk		Nationwide	Pancake	A Dutch-influenced pancake with larger diameter and thinner.
Pecel lele		East Java, but now available nationwide	Fried fish	Fried catfish with sambal.
Pempek		South Sumatra, but now available nationwide	Fried fishcake	Fried fishcake in sweet, sour, and spicy vinegar sauce.
Pepes		Nationwide	Cooked food in banana-leaf	Fish, meat, tofu, oncom, anchovy, mushroom or any other ingredients cooked inside a banana-leaf package.
Perkedel		Nationwide	Fried dish	Made of ground potatoes, minced meat, peeled and ground corn or tofu, or minced fish. Most common perkedel are made from mashed potatoes, yet there are other popular variants which includes perkedel jagung.
Perkedel jagung		Nationwide	Fried dish	A corn fritters.
Perkedel tahu		Nationwide	Fried dish	Dutch-Indonesian food based on tofu and inspired by frikadeller.
Puyunghai		Chinese Indonesian	Egg dish	An omelette which is usually made from the mixture of vegetables such as carrots, bean sprouts, and cabbages, mixed with meats such as crab meat, shrimp, or minced chicken. The dish is served in sweet and sour sauce with peas.
Rabeg		Banten	Meat dish	Made from mutton with simple ingredients. It is not too dangerous for those who suffer from cholesterol because this foods do not need coconut milk in the processing.
Rintek wuuk		Manado, North Sulawesi	Bush meat dish	Dog meat served in rich and plenty spices.
Satay, satai or sate		Nationwide	Roasted skewered meat, satay	Skewered barbecued meat that usually had peanut sauce, or sweet soy sauce. Many type of satay has developed throughout Indonesia. Often eaten with chopped shallots and sambal.
Sate babi		Balinese, Batak, Indo, and Chinese Indonesian	Roasted skewered meat, satay	A satay that made from pork meat. Popular among non-Muslim community.
Sate bandeng		Banten	Grilled fish, satay	Deboned milkfish, spiced and grilled in its skin on bamboo skewers over charcoal embers.
Sate kambing		Nationwide	Roasted skewered meat, satay	A variant of satay that made by grilling goat, lamb, or mutton meat that has been mixed with seasoning. Usually served during Eid ul-Adha.
Sate klatak		Yogyakarta	Roasted skewered meat, satay	Goat or mutton satay that it uses mainly salt and a pinch of pepper as its main marinating seasoning. The skewers used to grill or roast the satay are made of iron. This dish usually served with gulai.
Sate lilit		Bali	Roasted skewered meat, satay	Minced meat (pork, fish, or chicken) spiced and wrapped around bamboo or lemongrass stick as handle and grilled on charcoal.
Sate madura		Madurese	Roasted skewered meat, satay	A Madurese satay made from mutton or chicken, the recipe's main characteristic is the black sauce made from sweet soy sauce mixed with palm sugar, garlic, deep fried shallots, peanut paste, petis, candlenut, and salt.
Sate padang		Padang, West Sumatra	Roasted skewered meat, satay	A sate that made from beef cut into small cubes with spicy sauce on top. Its main characteristic is the thick yellow sauce made from rice flour mixed with beef and offal broth, turmeric, ginger, garlic, coriander, galangal root, cumin, curry powder and salt.
Sate taichan		Jakarta	Roasted skewered meat, satay	A spicy chicken satay in hot sambal sauce, served with lontong.
Sate udang		Nationwide	Seafood, satay	A type of satay that uses large shrimps or prawns, shelled and cleaned and often with the tails off and lightly grilled.
Seblak		Bandung, West Java	Savoury wet krupuk	A savoury and spicy dish made of wet krupuk (traditional Indonesian crackers) cooked with scrambled egg, vegetables, and other protein sources; either chicken, seafood, or slices of beef sausages, stir-fried with spicy sauces including garlic, shallot, sweet soy sauce, and chili sauce.
Se'i		Timorese	Smoked meat	With smoking or fumigation by using a mixture of salt and spices gives a unique taste.
Selat solo		Solo, Central Java	Beefsteak, salad	Braised beef tenderloin served in thin watery sauce, served with vegetables and potato. This dish is European-Javanese fusion dish.
Silio guro		Nias, North Sumatra	Seafood	Ground shrimp mixed with coconut, wrapped in banana leaf, grilled over charcoal
Sosis solo		Javanese	Sausage	A Javanese sausages made from beef or chicken and coated by egg.
Swikee		Purwodadi, Central Java	Frog leg dish	Frog legs cooked in various sauces.
Tauge ayam		Malay and Chinese Indonesian	Meat dish	Steamed chicken that served with bean sprouts and light soy sauce flavoured with oil.
Telur asin		Nationwide	Egg dish	Salted duck egg.
Telur pindang		Nationwide	Egg dish	Hard boiled eggs boiled in water mixed with salt, shallot skins, teak leaf and other spices.
Tinorangsak		Manado, North Sulawesi	Spicy meat dish	Pork, meat, chicken or seafood in spice.
Udang balado		Minangkabau	Seafood	A hot and spicy shrimp dish.
Woku		Manado, North Sulawesi	Spicy dish	Chicken or seafood (usually Fish) poured with Manadonese spicy yellow sauce/gravy.

=== Soy-based foods ===
Name	Image	Origin/Popularity	Type	Description
Mun tahu		Chinese Indonesian	Soy food, tofu dish	Soft tofu with minced chicken and shrimp braised in savoury sauce.
Oncom		West Java	Fermented food, soy food	Fermented beans using Neurospora intermedia mould.
Sapo tahu		Chinese Indonesian	Soy food, tofu dish	Soft tofu with vegetables, meat or seafood.
Tahu		Nationwide	Fermented food, soy food, tofu dish	Chinese origin, basically a soy milk cheese. It can be fried, stir fried, stewed, as soup ingredient, even also for sweets.
Tahu campur		Lamongan, East Java	Soy food, tofu dish	Fried tofu, lontong rice cakes, lentho (fried black-eyed pea patty) or sometimes replaced by perkedel, bean sprouts, lettuce, noodles and krupuk crackers, served in savoury petis-based beef stew.
Tahu goreng		Nationwide	Soy food, tofu dish	Deep fried tofu.
Tahu isi		Nationwide	Soy food, tofu dish	Deef fried tofu filled with vegetables such as bean sprouts and julienned carrot, and sometimes a few minced meat.
Tahu sumedang		Sumedang, West Java	Soy food, tofu dish	Deep fried tofu, served with sweet soy sauce/kecap manis and chili.
Tahu tauco		Nationwide	Soy food, tofu dish	Tofu in tauco sauce.
Tahu tek		Lamongan, East Java	Soy food, tofu dish	Deep fried tofu served with julienned vegetables and peanut, soy sauce and petis sauce. The tahu tek variant with egg addition is called tahu telur.
Tahu telur		Surabaya, East Java	Soy food, tofu dish	Deep fried tofu and egg, served with julienned vegetables and peanut, soy sauce and petis sauce
Tempeh		Nationwide	Fermented food, soy food	Can be cooked into various dishes; such as tempe bacem, tempe goreng, tempe orek, tumis tempe.
Tempeh burger		Nationwide	Soy food, hamburger	A fusion Javanese burger. Hamburger tempeh buns with salad, sauces or seasonings.
Tumpang		Central Java	Fermented dish, soy food	Similar to gulai, but rotten tempeh is used as seasoning instead of turmeric. Might add other ingredients such as beef ligaments. This dish can be found in Central and western part of East Java.
Yong tau fu		Nationwide	Soy food, tofu dish	A tofu dish that consisting primarily of tofu filled with ground meat mixture or fish paste.

=== Preserved meats ===
Name	Image	Origin/Popularity	Type	Description
Cha sio		Chinese Indonesian	Roasted meat	Chinese Indonesia roasted pork meat.
Dendeng		Nationwide, but especially Minangkabau	Meat dish	A thinly sliced dried meat. It is made of preserved through a mixture of sugar and spices and dried via a frying process.
Pekasam		South Kalimantan	Fermented food	A freshwater fish that fermented until it tastes sour, then seasoned with chili and sugar.
Serundeng		Java	Sprinkle dry meat	Beef sauted with grated coconut, garlic, ginger, lemongrass, salt, hot pepper, and terasi. Can be sprinkled on soto, or eaten with sticky rice.

== Rice dishes and porridges ==
=== Congees and porridges ===
Name	Image	Origin/Popularity	Type	Description
Bubur asyura		Sumatra	Grain porridge	Type of porridge made from grains. Usually served during Islamic New Year.
Bubur ayam		Java	Rice porridge, congee	Rice porridge served with soy sauce, spices, fried shallots, shredded chicken meat, beans, cakwee, krupuk, and sambal.
Bubur candil		Java	Sweet porridge	Glutinous rice cake ball stewed in gula jawa (palm sugar), served with thick coconut milk. Similar to kolak biji salak.
Bubur cha cha		Betawi and Malay	Sweet porridge	A traditional Betawi and Malay dessert, prepared using pearled sago, sweet potatoes, yams, bananas, coconut milk, pandan leaves, sugar and salt. It can be served hot or cold.
Bubur kacang hijau		Nationwide	Sweet porridge	Green beans porridge, sweetened with sugar, and served with thick coconut milk.
Bubur ketan hitam		Nationwide	Sweet porridge	Black glutinous rice porridge, sweetened with sugar, and served with thick coconut milk.
Bubur sumsum		Nationwide	Sweet porridge	White congee made from rice flour and eaten with brown sugar sauce.
Bubur pedas		Kalimantan	Rice porridge	Type of porridge made from finely ground sauteed rice and grated coconut. It is popular during Ramadan.
Jagung bose		Timorese	Corn porridge, grits	Grits that usually served with a mixture of kidney beans, peanuts, and se’i.
Tinutuan		Manado, North Sulawesi	Rice porridge, congee	Rice porridge served with spices, corn, vegetables, cassava or sweet potato, shallots, shredded salted fish, leek, and sambal.

=== Rice cake dishes ===
Name	Image	Origin/Popularity	Type	Description
Docang		Cirebon, West Java	Rice cake dish	A traditional food made of slices of rice cake, cassava leaves, sprouts, and krupuk, served in a thick vegetable sauce called dage, which is made of mashed tempeh mixed with grated coconut.
Ketupat sayur		West Sumatra and Jakarta	Rice cake dish	Pressed rice cake served with chicken or meat soup in coconut milk, chayote, jackfruit, and kerupuk.
Kupat tahu		Javanese and Sundanese	Rice cake dish	Pressed rice cake served with fried tofu and bean sprouts in peanut sauce topped with crispy krupuk crackers.
Lontong balap		Surabaya, East Java	Rice cake dish	Rice cake dish made from lontong, taoge (bean sprouts), fried tofu, lentho (fried mashed beans), fried shallots, sambal petis and sweet soy sauce.
Lontong cap go meh		Betawi and Chinese Indonesian	Rice cake dish	Lontong (pressed rice cake) served in soup, chicken, egg and meat, especially served on the fifteenth day of the first month of each Chinese year/Cap Go Meh.
Lontong sayur		Betawi	Rice cake dish	Pressed rice cake served with egg and tofu in coconut milk, common beans, chayote, jackfruit, and kerupuk.

=== Rice dishes ===
Name	Image	Origin/Popularity	Type	Description
Nasi ambeng		Javanese	Rice dish	A fragrant rice dish that consists of steamed white rice, chicken curry or chicken stewed in soy sauce, beef or chicken rendang, sambal goreng, urap, perkedel, and serundeng.
Nasi ayam		Semarang, Central Java	Rice dish, meat dish	A dish composed of rice, chicken, egg, tofu, and served with a sweet-salty coconut milk gravy.
Nasi bakar		Nationwide	Rice dish	A traditional steamed rice seasoned with spices and ingredients and wrapped in banana leaf secured with lidi semat (small needle made of central rib of coconut leaf) and later grilled upon charcoal fire.
Nasi bali		Nationwide, but especially popular in Bali	Rice dish	Balinese-style of mixed rice. The tastes are often distinctly local, punctuated by basa genep.
Nasi bebek		Chinese Indonesian	Rice dish, meat dish	Made of either braised or roasted duck and plain white rice.
Nasi bebek goreng		Nationwide, but especially popular in East Java and Bali	Rice dish, meat dish	Traditional seasoned fried duck, served with sambal hot and spicy chili paste, served with steamed rice.
Nasi biryani or nasi briyani		Malay and Indian Indonesian	Rice dish	A popular mixed rice dish derived from India with local taste, this dish almost similar to nasi kebuli.
Nasi bogana		Tegal, Central Java	Rice dish	A steamed rice dish wrapped in banana leaves and served with a variety of side dishes.
Nasi campur or nasi rames		Nationwide	Rice dish	Mixed rice with assorted vegetables and meat of choice.
Nasi dagang		Riau Islands	Rice dish	A rice dish consisting of rice steamed in coconut milk, fish curry and extra ingredients such as fried shaved coconut, hard-boiled eggs and vegetable pickles.
Nasi gandul		Javanese	Rice dish with beef soup	A rice dish served in sweet and spicy beef soup, specialty of Pati Regency, Central Java, Indonesia.
Nasi goreng		Nationwide	Rice dish, fried rice	(Fried Rice) steamed rice stir-fried with eggs, meatballs, chicken/beef/shrimp, assorted vegetables. The rice is made brown with thick and sweet soy sauce (kecap manis).
Nasi goreng jawa		Javanese	Rice dish, fried rice	Javanese fried rice, commonly seasoned with sambal.
Nasi goreng kambing		Betawi	Rice dish, fried rice	Spicy fried rice with goat meat, cooked in ghee.
Nasi goreng pattaya		Malay	Rice dish, fried rice	A type of fried rice that made by covering or wrapping chicken fried rice, in fried egg. It is often served with chili sauce and cucumber.
Nasi jamblang		Cirebon, West Java	Rice dish	Rice dish with menus are usually available which include chili fries, tofu vegetables, lung (troop), liver or meat stews, cakes, satay potatoes, scrambled eggs, fried eggs, cooked chili, stewed fish, salted fish, tofu and tempeh.
Nasi jinggo		Bali	Rice dish	A Balinese typical fast food that is packaged with small portions of banana leaves.
Nasi kabsah		Arab Indonesian	Rice dish	Mixed rice dish that originating from Arabia.
Nasi kapau		Minangkabau	Rice dish	A steamed rice topped with various choices of dishes originated from Bukittinggi, West Sumatra.
Nasi kari		Nationwide	Rice dish	Rice dish mixed with curry (it can be chicken, mutton, or fish head curry).
Nasi kebuli		Betawi and Arab Indonesian	Rice dish	Steamed rice dish cooked in goat broth, milk, and ghee. Usually served during Mawlid.
Nasi kucing		Nationwide	Rice dish	A traditional rice dish that originated from Yogyakarta and Central Java. It consists of a small portion of rice with toppings, usually sambal, dried fish, and tempeh, wrapped in banana leaves.
Nasi kuning		Nationwide	Rice dish	Usually eaten during special event. The rice is cooked with coconut milk and turmeric, hence the name nasi kuning (yellow rice). It is usually served with more variety of side dishes than nasi campur.
Nasi lemak		Nationwide, but especially popular in North Sumatra and Riau	Rice dish	It is a Malay fragrant rice dish cooked in coconut milk and pandan leaf. Usually served for breakfast.
Nasi liwet		Solo, Central Java	Rice dish	Usually rice processed with coconut milk and served with chicken, egg, and spicy broth.
Nasi mandi		Arab Indonesian	Rice dish	Usually made from rice, meat (lamb, camel, goat or chicken), and a mixture of spices.
Nasi megono		Javanese	Rice dish	A rice dish with chopped young jackfruit mixed with coconut and other spices. This dish influenced by Indian cuisine.
Nasi minyak		South Sumatra and Jambi	Rice dish	A cooked rice with ghee and spices.
Nasi padang		Nationwide	Rice dish	This term usually means rice with a variety of dishes common in the specific region, cooked in coconut milk and a taste of chili.
Nasi pecel		Java	Rice dish	Rice served with cooked vegetables and peanut sauce. The vegetables are usually kangkung or water spinach, long beans, cassava leaves, papaya leaves, and in East Java often used kembang turi. Taste best when eaten with fried tempeh, traditional cracker, and spiced coconut flakes. Popular in East and Central Java.
Nasi tempong		Javanese	Rice dish	Steamed rice usually served with fried fish, vegetables, and tempeh. Served with hot and spicy sambal. Specialty of Banyuwangi, East Java.
Nasi tim		Chinese Indonesian	Rice dish	Steamed rice usually served with chicken and mushroom cooked in sweet soy sauce. Served with ginger.
Nasi timbel		Sundanese	Rice dish	A hot dish consisting of steamed rice wrapped inside a banana leaf.
Nasi tutug oncom		Sundanese	Rice dish	A savoury rice dish, made of rice mixed with roasted oncom fermented beans.
Nasi uduk		Betawi	Rice dish	Steamed rice cooked with coconut milk. It is usually served with variety of vegetables and meat of choice. It is similar to nasi rames, but the rice is steamed.
Nasi ulam		Jakarta	Rice dish	Steamed rice mixed with kuah semur (sweet soy sauce soup), serundeng (coconut granules) and peanut granules, sliced cucumber and bean sprouts; served with variety of vegetables and meat of choice toppings, such as dendeng daging (beef jerky), omelette, anchovy, fried tempeh and tofu, rice vermicelli, fried mashed potato. It is similar to nasi uduk and nasi rames, but the rice is mixed.
Rijsttafel		Nationwide	Rice dish	Rice accompanied by side dishes served in small portions.
Tumpeng		Nationwide	Rice dish	Cone shaped rice surrounded with assorted dishes.
Uli bakar		West Java	Sticky rice	Grilled sticky rice, commonly eaten with oncom or serundeng grated coconut.

== Noodle dishes ==
Name	Image	Origin/Popularity	Type	Description
Bakmi		Nationwide	Noodle dish	Bakmi is normally boiled for serving. When bakmi is intended for use in soup, it is usually boiled separately from the broth. The noodles are usually mixed with either pork fat, chicken fat, or beef fat.
Bihun goreng		Nationwide	Noodle dish	Fried thin rice noodles with spices and chili darkened with kecap manis.
Char kway teow		Chinese Indonesian	Noodle dish	This dish is commonly stir-fried with egg, slices of sausages, fishcake, beansprouts, and less commonly with other ingredients.
I fu mi		Nationwide	Noodle dish	It is a crispy deep-fried thick noodle dish served in a thick savory sauce with pieces of meat or seafood and vegetables.
Kwetiau ayam		Chinese Indonesian	Noodle dish	Flat noodle with chicken, sometimes served with pangsit (wonton) and bakso (meatball) soup.
Kwetiau goreng		Nationwide	Noodle dish	Stir fried flat noodle, similar to char kway teow.
Kwetiau siram sapi		Chinese Indonesian	Noodle dish	A dish of flat rice noodles stir-fried and topped with slices of beef or sometimes beef offal served either dry or with soup.
Laksa		Nationwide	Noodle dish	A spicy noodle soup derived from Peranakan cuisine which has various types. It consists of thick wheat noodles or rice vermicelli with chicken, prawn or fish, served in spicy soup based on either rich and spicy curry coconut milk or on sour asam.
Laksa banjar		Banjarmasin, South Kalimantan	Spicy noodle dish	Steamed noodle-like balls, made from rice flour paste, served in a thick yellowish soup made from coconut milk, ground spices, and snakehead fish broth.
Laksa betawi		Jakarta	Spicy noodle dish	Betawi laksa contains rice vermicelli, beansprouts, and dried shrimp broth soup.
Laksa bogor		Bogor, West Java	Spicy noodle dish	The popular one in Indonesia is Laksa Bogor which contains rice vermicelli, beansprouts, and oncom.
Lakso		Palembang, South Sumatra	Noodle dish	A spicy noodle dish served in savoury yellowish coconut milk-based soup, flavoured with fish, and sprinkled with fried shallots.
Macaroni schotel		Nationwide	Pasta, casserole	A type of macaroni casserole that is usually made with cheese, potato, and meat (smoked beef, sausage or tuna).
Mi aceh		Aceh	Noodle dish	Acehnese Curry noodles. There are two variations: fried and dry, and soupy. Usually made with goat meat or seafood and served with emping, slices of shallots, cucumber, and lime.
Mi ayam		Javanese and Chinese Indonesian	Noodle dish	Chicken noodle dish. Also known as Cui Mie. Usually served with spring onions, fried wontons, and chicken soup.
Mi bakso		Nationwide	Noodle dish	Noodle soup with bakso meatball.
Mi bangladesh		Nationwide	Noodle dish	It's made from Fried noodles with half-cooked egg, chicken and fried onions.
Mi cakalang		Manado, North Sulawesi	Noodle dish	Skipjack tuna noodle soup.
Mi caluk		Aceh	Noodle dish	It is a noodle dish served with a splash of thick spicy sauce made from a mixture of tomato, chili pepper or chili sauce, coconut milk, ground peanuts, spiced with shallot, garlic, lemongrass, and citrus leaf, and served with pieces of vegetables, sliced cucumber and krupuk.
Mi celor		Palembang, South Sumatra	Noodle dish	A noodle and egg dish. With beansprout and fried shallots. The white sauce is made with a mixture of "ebi" or dried shrimp with a unique taste.
Mi gomak		Batak	Noodle dish	Thick spicy noodle soup dish served in coconut milk and andaliman-based broth, specialty of Toba Batak region of North Sumatra.
Mi goreng		Nationwide	Noodle dish	(Fried Noodles) served with eggs, sometimes chicken, beef or seafood, with assorted vegetables such as thinly sliced carrots, (bok choi) or Chinese cabbage.
Mi jawa		Javanese	Noodle dish	A traditional Javanese-style noodle.
Mi kangkung		Jakarta	Noodle dish	Noodle served with kangkung (water spinach), and sweet chicken.
Mi kari		Malay and Indian Indonesian	Noodle dish	A noodle dish made up of thin yellow egg noodles or bihun with spicy curry soup, sambal, coconut milk, and a choice of dried tofu, prawns, cuttlefish, chicken, egg, and mint leaves.
Mi kering		Makassarese and Chinese Indonesian	Noodle dish	Dried noodles served with thick gravy and sliced chicken, shrimp, mushrooms, liver, and squid.
Mi koba		Bangka Belitung	Noodle dish	Noodles with fish broth served with boiled egg.
Mi koclok		Cirebon, West Java	Noodle dish	Noodle in white-coloured extra-thick soup, made of chicken broth and coconut milk and shredded chicken breast.
Mi kocok		Bandung, West Java	Noodle dish	Noodle in beef broth served with cow's tendons or cartilage.
Mi kopyok		Semarang, Central Java	Noodle dish	A boiled noodle in garlic soup.
Mi kuah		Nationwide	Noodle dish	Boiled noodle soup.
Mi ongklok		Wonosobo, Central Java	Noodle dish	A boiled noodles were made using cabbage, chunks of chopped leaves, and a starchy thick soup called ‘’loh’’. Usually served with satay and tempeh.
Mi pangsit		Nationwide, but especially Javanese and Chinese Indonesian	Noodle dish	Noodle served with pangsit or soft-boiled wonton.
Soto mi		Nationwide	Noodle dish	A spicy noodle soup dish.

== Soups and stews ==
Name	Image	Origin/Popularity	Type	Description
Asam pedas		Malay and Minangkabau	Stew, spicy fish	Sour and spicy fish stew dish, popular in Sumatra and Kalimantan.
Ayam buah keluak		Peranakan	Stew	A chicken rib stew cooked with the nuts from the Pangium edule. For this recipe, the contents of the buah keluak is dug out and sauteed with aromatics and seasonings, before it is stuffed back into the nuts and braised with the chicken rib pieces.
Bak kut teh		Riau	Meat soup	A pork rib dish cooked in broth.
Bakso		Nationwide	Meatball	Beef meatballs. Usually served in a bowl of beef broth, with yellow noodles, bihun (rice vermicelli), vegetables, tofu, egg (wrapped within bakso, Chinese green cabbage, bean sprout, sprinkled with fried shallots and celery.
Bakso ikan		Nationwide	Meatball	Small balls that were made from fish.
Bakwan malang		Malang, East Java and Bali	Meatball	Also known as bakso malang, meatball noodle soup with fried wontons.
Brenebon		Eastern Indonesia	Vegetable soups	A kidney beans soup with vegetables served in broth seasoned with garlic, pepper and other spices.
Brongkos		Yogyakarta and Central Java	Meat stew	Meat (beef or mutton) with beans (black-eyed peas or kidney beans) stew, with spicy soup made of kluwek, coconut milk and other spices.
Coto makassar		Makassarese	Meat soup	A Makassarese beef soup, a traditional beef and offal soto variant from Makassar, South Sulawesi.
Empal gentong		Cirebon, West Java	Meat soup	Mutton or goat offal soup.
Feijoada		Timorese	Meat soup	A Timorese beans soup with beef and pork, influenced by Portuguese cuisine.
Kaledo		Donggala, Central Sulawesi	Meat soup	A traditional cow's trotters soup served in spicy broth.
Katemak		Timorese	Meat soup	A beef soup served with sweet potatoes, sweet corns, and some green vegetables such as cassava leaves and papaya leaves.
Konro		Buginese and Makassarese	Meat soup	A spicy ribs soup specialty of Makassar, South Sulawesi.
Marak		Arab Indonesian	Meat soup	Goat meat dish with pumpkin and chicken meat. This dish was result of Arab–Indonesian acculturation.
Pallubasa		Makassar, South Sulawesi	Meat soup	Spicy beef offal soup.
Pindang		Palembang, South Sumatra	Fish soup	Fish boiled in salt and sour-tasting spices, usually tamarind.
Rawon		East Java	Meat soup, stew	A beef soup in dark soup. The dark colour comes from the meaty seeds of kluwak nuts. Usually served with uncooked mung bean sprouts and salty duck eggs.
Saksang		Batak highlands	Stew	Pork or dog meat (or more rarely, water buffalo meat), cooked in its blood, mixed with coconut milk and spices (including kaffir lime and bay leaves, coriander, shallot, garlic, chili pepper and Thai pepper, lemongrass, ginger, galangal, turmeric and andaliman.
Saltah		Arab Indonesian	Stew	Dish with the base is a brown meat stew called maraq, a dollop of fenugreek froth, and sahawiq. Rice, potatoes, scrambled eggs, and vegetables are common additions to saltah.
Sayur asem		Nationwide	Vegetable soup	Sour dish (tamarind) clear soup with assorted vegetables such as: (melinjo) or gnetum gnemon, melinjo leaves, sweet corn (still on the cobs), young papaya, peanuts, and tamarind.
Sayur bayam		Nationwide	Vegetable soup	Spinach and corn in clear soup flavoured with temu kunci.
Sayur lodeh		Nationwide	Vegetable soup	Mixed vegetables in coconut milk stew.
Sayur oyong		Nationwide	Vegetable soup	Chinese okra vegetable soup with rice vermicelli.
Sayur sop		Nationwide	Vegetable soup	A vegetables soup (common beans, carrot, cabbages, potato, celery, cauliflower, fried shallots) with macaroni and bakso or sausage in chicken broth soup, often includes diced chicken.
Sekba		Chinese Indonesian	Meat soup	Pork offals stewed in mild soy sauce-based soup.
Semur		Nationwide	Stew	Stew made of kecap manis (sweet soy sauce) and spices, usually uses beef.
Sop buntut		Nationwide, but especially in Java	Meat Soup or roasted meat	An ox-tail soup, served in clear soup or roasted alone then served with barbecue sauce.
Sop saudara		Makassar, South Sulawesi	Meat soup	A spicy beef or buffalo soup.
Soto, sroto, coto, or tauto		Nationwide	Meat soup	A soup of chicken or beef. Many variants of soto has developed across Indonesia. Many types of soto have the colour of yellow because turmeric is added as one of the ingredients.
Soto ayam		Nationwide	Meat soup	A yellow spicy chicken soup with lontong or ketupat and rice vermicelli.
Soto betawi		Betawi	Meat soup	A type of soto that were made of beef or beef offal, cooked in a whitish cow milk or coconut milk broth, with fried potato and tomato.
Soto madura		East Java	Meat soup	A type of soto made with either chicken, beef or offal, in a yellowish transparent broth.
Soto padang		Minangkabau	Meat soup	A beef rice noodle soup with potatoes and egg, specialty of Padang.
Sup ayam		Nationwide	Meat soup	A soup made from chicken, simmered in water, usually with various other ingredients.
Sup ercis or erten		Nationwide	Vegetable soup	A soup that made of thick stew of green split peas, celeriac or stalk celery, onions, leeks, carrots, and often potato. This dish was result of Dutch–Indonesian acculturation. This dish is similar to sop senerek.
Sup kambing		Nationwide	Meat soup	Mutton soup prepared with goat meat, tomato, celery, spring onion, ginger, candlenut and lime leaf, in savoury broth.
Sup krim ayam		Nationwide	Meat soup, cream soup	Indonesian chicken cream soup.
Sup sarang burung		Chinese Indonesian	Bird's nest soup	Edible bird's nest soup.
Sup wortel		Nationwide	Vegetable soup	A soup prepared with carrot as a primary ingredient. It can be prepared as a cream or broth-style soup.
Tekwan		Palembang, South Sumatra	Fishcake soup	A soup of fishcake with bangkoang and mushroom.
Tengkleng		Java	Meat soup	Goat bone soup.
Timlo		Javanese	Meat soup	A beef and vegetable soup. Some versions also have noodles, as a beef noodle soup.
Tongseng		Solo, Central Java	Meat soup	Goat meat or beef stew dishes in a curry-like soup with vegetables and kecap manis (sweet soy sauce).

== Salads and vegetable dishes ==
Name	Image	Origin/Popularity	Type	Description
Acar		Nationwide	Salad, pickles	Various chopped vegetables in vinegar.
Asinan		Java	Salad, vegetarian food	A pickled (through brined or vinegared) vegetable or fruit dish.
Cah kangkung		Nationwide	Vegetarian food	A vegetable dish of stir-fried water spinach.
Cap cai		Chinese Indonesian	Vegetarian food	Stir fried of ten types of vegetables dish. There are two types of Cap Cai, Red and White. Red uses Indonesian Tomato Sauce or Ketchup to give it a distinct sweet flavour, while the white one has nothing added to it.
Daun ubi tumbuk		Sumatra, Kalimantan, and Sulawesi	Vegetarian food	Pounded cassava leaf in spices.
Gado-gado		Java	Salad, vegetarian food	A mixture of vegetables, shrimp or fish crackers with peanut sauce. Often dubbed the Indonesian salad.
Hutspot		Nationwide	Vegetarian food	Indo-Dutch-origin boiled and mashed potatoes, carrots, and onions. It can be served with sambal.
Jasuke		Nationwide	Salad	Sweet corn topped with cheese shreds and condensed milk
Kangkung belacan		Nationwide	Vegetarian food	Stir-fried water spinach seasoned with shrimp paste.
Karedok		West Java	Salad, vegetarian food	Raw vegetables served with peanut sauce. An equivalent to Jakarta's Gado-Gado (It's close to East Java pecel, but karedok uses raw vegetables).
Ketoprak		Jakarta	Vegetarian food	Similar to gado-gado but is served with bihun (rice vermiceli) and salty, hence the whole dish is sometimes called "Bakmi Ketoprak"/Ketoprak noodle).
Kuluban		Java	Salad, vegetarian food	Javanese traditional salad.
Lalap		Sundanese and Javanese	Salad, vegetarian food	It is a raw vegetable salad served with sambal terasi.
Pecel		Central Java and East Java	Salad, vegetarian food	Javanese traditional salad served in peanut sauce.
Plecing kangkung		Lombok, West Nusa Tenggara	Spicy vegetable	Lombok cuisine water spinach in plecing sambal.
Rujak		Nationwide	Salad	There are many kinds of rujak, the most common one is Rujak Buah (fruit rujak). Rujak manis, is a mixture of fruit covered with sweet and spicy coconut sugar sauce, sometimes ground peanut is also added to the sauce.
Rujak cingur		Surabaya, East Java	Vegetables with cow's lips	A mixture of vegetables, tofu, tempeh, lontong rice cake, beansprouts with petis black fish paste sauce and slices of boiled cow's lips.
Rujak juhi		Betawi and Chinese Indonesian	Vegetables with salted cuttlefish	A mixture of vegetables, tofu, noodles, lontong rice cake, potato, and juhi salted cuttlefish served in spicy peanut sauce.
Rujak shanghai		Betawi and Chinese Indonesian	Vegetables with boiled seafood	A mixture of kangkung water spinach, preserved squid, edible jellyfish, daikon and cucumber, served in thick red-colored sweet and sour sauce, sprinkled with peanuts granules and sambal.
Rujak soto		Banyuwangi, East Java	Vegetables with soto	A unique blend of vegetable salad with soto, include soto daging (beef) or soto babat.
Salad makaroni		Nationwide	Salad	A type of pasta salad, served cold made with cooked elbow macaroni and usually prepared with mayonnaise.
Tauge goreng		Bogor, West Java	Stir fried bean sprout	A savoury vegetarian dish made of stir fried tauge (bean sprouts) with slices of tofu, ketupat rice cake and yellow noodle, served in spicy oncom-based sauce.
Terong balado		Minangkabau	Vegetarian food, spicy dish	Eggplant in balado sauce.
Ulam		Malay	Salad, vegetarian food	A traditional salad produced from the fresh leaves, vegetables or fruits which can be eaten raw or after soaked in hot water.
Urap		Javanese	Salad, vegetarian food	A salad dish of steamed vegetables mixed with seasoned and spiced grated coconut for dressing.
Yee sang		Chinese Indonesian	Fish salad	Fresh fish salad with sliced vegetables, such as carrot and turnips. Usually served during Chinese New Year.

== Breads and sandwiches ==
Name	Image	Region/Ethnicity	Type	Description
Apam		Nationwide, especially popular in Java	Bread, pancake, fermented food	A steamed dough made of rice flour, coconut milk, yeast and palm sugar, usually served with grated coconut.
Bakpau		Nationwide	Bread, dumpling	A type of baozi that very typical in Indonesia, filled with chocolate, strawberry, cheese, mung bean, read bean, minced beef, diced chicken, or minced pork.
Bolu gulung		Nationwide	Bread, cake	A type of Swiss roll that filled with butter cream, cheese, kaya, or fruit jam. It is also very common for Swiss rolls to be sold by the slice, but some shops sell by both slice and roll.
Bolu kukus		Nationwide	Bread, cake	A sponge cake that mainly only uses wheat flour (without any rice flour and tapioca) with common vanilla, chocolate, or strawberry flavouring, acquired from food flavouring essence as ingredients.
Bolu pandan		Nationwide	Bread, cake	A light, fluffy, green-colored sponge cake flavored with the juices of pandan leaves.
Chapati		Indian Indonesian	Flatbread	A thin, unleavened flatbread originating from India, brought by the Indian immigrant to the country.
Kamir		Central Java	Bread	A round-shaped bread that almost similar to apem, consisting of flour, butter, and egg mixture, sometimes mixed with other ingredients such as Ambon banana or tapai.
Kompia		Java and Lesser Sunda Islands	Bread	A bread that made of lard, onions, salt and flour. A ball of flour is stuffed with a filling of other desired ingredients and flattened with a rolling pin.
Naan		Arab Indonesian and Indian Indonesian	Flatbread	A leavened, oven-baked flatbread. It is usually eaten with an array of sauces such as chutney and curries.
Oliebol		Nationwide	Bread, dumpling, fried dish	Fried dumpling bread or cake, filled with raisins or apple.
Ontbijtkoek		Nationwide, with Dutch-influenced	Bread	A wheat bread with rich spices usually served during breakfast. This dish was result of Dutch–Indonesian acculturation.
Panada		Manado, North Sulawesi	Bread, dumpling, fried dish	Fried bread filled with spicy tuna.
Roti bakar		Nationwide	Bread, sandwich, toast	Toast that served with jam, chocolate, or cheese, commonly known as street food.
Roti bolen		Nationwide	Bread, cake	Baked pastry with crust layers similar to those of croissant, baked flour with butter or margarine layers, filled with cheese and banana. Other variants uses durian fillings. The cake demonstrate European pastry influences.
Roti buaya		Betawi	Bread, pastry	Crocodile-shaped bread commonly served during Betawi wedding and celebrations.
Roti canai		Acehnese, Malay, Minangkabau, and Indian Indonesian	Flatbread	Heavy Indian influenced paratha-like roti served with curry (especially goat or lamb curry) or other condiments.
Roti gambang or ganjel rel		Jakarta and Semarang, Central Java	Bread, pastry	A rectangular shaped brown bread with sesame seeds, flavored with cinnamon and palm sugar. Usually served during Dugderan and Ramadhan.
Roti jala		Malay and Minangkabau	Pancake	A pretty dish that looks like a lace doily due to the way it is made. Usually served with curry goat or lamb goat.
Roti john		Malay	Sandwich	A Malay omelette sandwich, a European-influenced dish.
Roti konde or roti maryam		Javanese and Arab Indonesian	Flatbread	A type of roti canai. Their recipes are quite similar and influenced by Indian paratha.
Roti lapis tempe		Nationwide	Sandwich	A Javanese fusion dish of fried, grilled or otherwise cooked tempeh patties, sandwiched between slices of bread.
Roti meses		Nationwide	Sandwich	Sandwich bread with sprinkles as filling or topping.
Roti pita		Arab Indonesian	Flatbread	A yeast-leavened round flatbread baked from wheat flour, sometimes with a pocket.
Roti tisu		Malay	Flatbread	A thinner version of the traditional roti canai, as thin as a piece of 40–50 cm round-shaped tissue.

== Snacks and starters ==
=== Savoury snacks ===
Name	Image	Region/Popularity	Type	Description
Ampo		Central Java and East Java	Soil food	A snack made by soil. The snack consists of pure clay, without any mixture of ingredients.
Arem-arem		Java	Dumpling, rice cake	Similar to lontong, but flavoured with coconut milk, and stuffed with cooked ground meat, or tofu and tempeh.
Bakcang		Chinese Indonesian	Dumpling, rice cake	Rice cake filled with meats, sometimes beans, mushroom, and salty egg, wrapped in bamboo leaves.
Bakwan		Nationwide	Fried dish	A traditional fritter consisting of vegetables and batter. The ingredients are vegetables; usually beansprouts, shredded cabbages and carrots, battered and deep fried in cooking oil.
Bakso bakar		Nationwide	Meatball dish	Grilled and skewered bakso, prepared in a similar fashion to satay.
Bakso goreng		Java	Meatball dish	Fried bakso with a rather hard texture, usually consumed solely as a snack.
Batagor		West Java	Dumpling, fishcake	Batagor is actually an abbreviation of bakso tahu goreng (which literally means fried tofu and meatballs), it's a variant of the siomay in which the siomay was deep-fried.
Belalang goreng		Central Java, Yogyakarta, and East Java	Insect dish	Fried grasshopper.
Be urutan		Bali	Pork sausage	A Balinese traditional pork (mostly) sausage.
Bitterballen		Nationwide	Fried dish	A meat-based snack with round-shape, almost similar to kroket.
Cakwe		Java	Doughnut, fried dish	A long golden-brown deep-fried strip of dough and commonly chopped or thinly sliced and then eaten for breakfast with bubur ayam.
Chai kue		West Kalimantan	Dumpling	A traditional dumpling that must be steamed before served. Filled of yam, taro, or chives. This food is similar to croquette and pastel.
Cilok		Bandung, West Java	Dumpling	Ball-shaped dumpling made from aci (tapioca starch), cilok is an abbreviation of aci dicolok or "poked tapioca", served with peanut sauce, kecap manis (sweet soy sauce), sambal, bottled chili sauce, or served in soup.
Cimol		Bandung, West Java	Fried dish	A small snack made from rounded tapioca flour doughs which is then fried. Cimol comes from Bandung, West Java.
Cireng		West Java	Fried dish	A small snack made out of fried tapioca batter
Combro		Sundanese	Fried dish	A fritter made from grated cassava with round or oval-shape. This dish is filled of oncom and chilli.
Donat jawa		Javanese	Doughnut, fried dish	A Javanese-style of ring-shaped fritter made from cassava with savoury taste.
Donat kentang		Nationwide	Doughnut, fried dish	A ring-shaped fritter made from flour and mashed potatoes, coated in powder sugar or icing sugar.
Epok-epok or Karipap		Malay	Dumpling, fried dish	A dumpling snack usually filled with chicken and potato with a dried curry inside.
Jalangkote		Makassarese	Dumpling, fried dish	Fried pastry with an empanada-shape and stuffed with vegetables, potatoes and eggs. Spicy, sweet and sour sauce will be dipped into prior to be eaten.
Jemput-jemput		Malay	Fried dish	A traditional Malay fritter snack made from flour and then fried. It is usually round in shape and tends to vary in size.
Kembang tahu		Chinese Indonesian	Soy food, tofu dish	Soft tofu with warm sweet ginger soup.
Kerak telor		Jakarta	Egg dish, omelette	It is made from chicken or duck egg made into omelette which is mixed with glutinous rice and spice, it is served with coconut granules.
Kroket		Nationwide	Fried dish	A type of croquette, made of mashed potato filled with minced chicken.
Kuaci		Nationwide	Edible plant seeds	A baked plant seeds, it can be sunflower or pumpkin seeds.
Lemper		Java	Dumpling, rice cake	A traditional rice cake, made from glutinous rice and filled usually with chicken.
Lepet		Javanese, Malay, and Sundanese	Dumpling, rice cake	Sticky rice dumpling mixed with peanuts cooked with coconut milk packed inside janur (young coconut leaf or palm leaf). It is similar to lontong, but with stickier texture and richer flavour acquired from coconut milk and peanuts.
Lumpia		Nationwide	Spring roll	A spring roll, made of thin paper-like or crepe-like pastry skin called "lumpia wrapper" enveloping savory or sweet fillings. It is often served as an appetizer or snack, and might be served deep fried or fresh (unfried).
Lumpia semarang		Semarang, Central Java	Spring roll	Semarang style spring roll, made mainly from cooked bamboo shoots and chicken/prawn. Sometimes boiled quail egg is added. It is eaten with a dipping sauce made from coconut sugar, vinegar and garlic.
Martabak		Nationwide	Egg dish, pancake	Indonesian's version of Murtabak, sometimes filled with beef and scallions, or shreds of peanut and chocolate.
Martabak aceh		Acehnese	Egg dish, pancake	A type of Indonesian martabak, that shaped like roti canai and served with curries.
Martabak mesir		West Sumatra	Egg dish, pancake	Minangkabau-style of Indonesian martabak. It is Arab–Indian–Minangkabau fusion dish.
Martabak mi		Nationwide	Egg dish, pancake	Noodles mixed with eggs then fried, shaped like martabak generally.
Mendoan		Central Java	Soy food, fried dish	Deep fried battered tempeh, cooked lightly in a short time and resulted in limp texture.
Nagasari		Nationwide	Dumpling, banana cake	Steamed rice cake wrapped in banana leaves, and stuffed with banana.
Ngo hiang		Chinese Indonesian	Fried dish	A deep-fried dish that consisting of vegetables with meat or shrimp seasoned with five-spice powder in a thin egg crêpe.
Nyonya chang		Peranakan	Dumpling, rice cake	A type of zongzi that filled of minced pork with candied winter melon, ground roasted peanuts, and a spice mix.
Otak-otak		Nationwide	Fishcake	Usually made from Spanish mackarel fish paste or Milkfish, spiced and wrapped in banana leaves, then grilled and served with peanut sauce.
Pai ti		Peranakan and Malay	Pastry	A thin and crispy pastry tart shell filled with a spicy, sweet mixture of thinly sliced vegetables and prawns.
Pangsit basah		Chinese Indonesian	Dumpling, wonton dish	Wonton served in gravy with noodle or other gravy-dishes.
Pangsit goreng		Chinese Indonesian	Dumpling, wonton dish, fried dish	Fried wonton filled with chicken or shrimp with sweet and sour sauce.
Pastel		Nationwide	Dumpling, fried dish	Fried flour dumpling filled with vegetables and meat.
Pastel tutup		Nationwide	Pie	A type of shepherd's pie that made with chicken and several vegetables.
Pisang cokelat		Java	Fried dish	A savoury snack made of slices of banana with melted chocolate or chocolate syrup, wrapped inside thin crepe-like pastry skin and being deep fried.
Pisang goreng		Nationwide	Fried dish	A battered and deep-fried banana or plantain.
Pisang molen		Nationwide	Fried dish	Banana wrapped around in tape-shaped thin pastry dough prior to frying, creating crunchy textures of pastry skin, while the banana inside remains moist and soft.
Popiah		Chinese Indonesian	Spring roll	A spring roll with Chinese origin and Fujian-style. This dish almost equal to lumpia.
Risoles		Nationwide	Spring roll, pastry	Fried rolls with breadcrumbs filled with vegetables and meat.
Samosa		Malay, Arab Indonesian, and Indian Indonesian	Dumpling, fried dish	It is a fried or baked dish with a savoury filling, such as spiced potato, curry, cheese or rousong.
Semar mendem		Java	Dumpling, rice cake	A variant snack almost identical to lemper that made of glutinous rice filled with shredded seasoned chicken. Instead of banana leaf wrapping, semar mendem uses a thin omelette as wrapper, hence rendering the whole package edible.
Siomay		Sundanese and Chinese Indonesian	Dumpling, fishcake	A light meal which has a similar form to Chinese Dim Sum, shaped like ice cream cone except the bottom is flat and made traditionally from mackerel fish meat served with peanut sauce, sometimes added with key lime or soy sauce.
Sumpia		Nationwide	Spring roll	Much smaller and drier lumpia with similar beef or prawn floss filling
Tahu aci		Tegal, Central Java	Soy food, tofu dish	A small snack made from tofu and flour. Its come from Tegal, Central Java.
Tahu gejrot		Cirebon, West Java	Soy food, tofu dish	Deep fried tofu, served with a sauce made from coconut sugar, sweet soy sauce/kecap manis, chili, garlic and shallot.
Tahu gunting		Surabaya, East Java	Soy food, tofu dish	Deep fried tofu cut with scissors, served with a sauce made from rice flour, peanuts and chili.
Tahu sumedang		Sumedang, West Java	Soy food, tofu dish	Deep fried tofu, served with sweet soy sauce/kecap manis and chili.
Timphan		Aceh	Dumpling, banana cake	A steamed banana dumpling that consists of glutinous rice flour, ground banana and coconut milk. It is quite similar to Javanese or Buginese nagasari.

=== Sweet snacks ===
Name	Image	Region/Popularity	Type	Description
Bagea		Maluku Islands	Cake	A cake made of sago, has a round shape and creamy color. It has a hard consistency that can be softened in tea or water, to make it easier to chew.
Bahulu		Malay	Pastry	A Malay traditional cake with soft texture. Usually served for breakfast.
Bakpia		Nationwide, but especially in Java	Pastry, bean cake	A popular Indonesian bean-filled moon cake-like pastry.
Bakpia pathok		Yogyakarta	Pastry, bean cake	A small patty of baked pastry filled with sweet mung bean paste.
Brem		Madiun, East Java	Sweets	Brem is made from fermented tape. Brem is a special snack from Madiun, East Java. The liquid version is light alcoholic beverage also called Brem originated from Bali.
Clorot		Nationwide, but especially Javanese	Sweets	Sticky dough of glutinous rice flour sweetened with coconut sugar filled into the cone-shaped janur (young coconut leaf), and steamed until cooked.
Dadar gulung		Javanese, today nationwide	Pancake	Usually has a green colour, which is acquired from daun suji or pandan leaves It is a green-coloured folded omelette or pancake made of rice flour, filled with grated coconut and palm sugar.
Gethuk		Java	Cassava cake	Cassava paste, sweetened with sugar and moulded in a special tools that it resembles noodles. Often served with fresh grated coconut.
Kaasstengels		Nationwide	Cookie	It is made from dough flour, eggs, margarine, and grated cheese. This cake shaped rectangular. Usually served during Eid ul-Fitr, Christmas, and Chinese New Year.
Kembang goyang		Betawi and Javanese	Cookie	Made of rice flour which is mixed with eggs, sugar, a pinch of salt, and coconut milk. The dough can be fried after heating the oil and the ‘’kembang goyang’’ mold.
Klappertaart		Manado, North Sulawesi	Coconut custard	Tart made from flour, sugar, milk, butter, as well as coconut flesh and juice.
Klepon		Nationwide	Sweet coconut cake	Boiled rice cake, stuffed with coconut sugar, and rolled in fresh grated coconut. It is flavoured with pandan leaves juice.
Kue ape		Jakarta	Pancake	A thin wheat flour batter pancake with thicker part on the middle, colloquially called kue tetek (breast cake).
Kue busa or schuimpje		Nationwide	Pastry	A sweet pastry made of eggs that are beaten until foamy with fine sugar until stiff. Formed using triangular plastic and baked in the oven.
Kue carabikang		Java	Cake	A traditional cake made of rice flour shaped like flower-chapped and colorful. It tastes sweet.
Kue gapit		Cirebonese and Javanese	Waffle	A waffle-cracker snack that grilled between iron molds like a waffle generally.
Kue kaak		Arab Indonesian	Biscuit, cookie	A small circular biscuit as result of acculturation between Arabs and Indonesian.
Kue kacang tanah		Nationwide	Sweet snack	A kind of pastry made from peanuts with various forms, such as round, heart, or crescents.
Kue keranjang		Chinese Indonesian	Sweets	A food prepared from glutinous rice. Usually served during Chinese New Year.
Kue ku		Betawi, Javanese, and Chinese Indonesian	Pastry	A small round or oval shaped Chinese pastry with soft sticky glutinous rice flour skin wrapped around a sweet filling in the centre.
Kue leker		Java	Pancake, crepe	Indonesian crepe that made with wheat flour, eggs, milk, and sugar.
Kue lidah kucing		Nationwide	Cookie	A type of cookie shaped like a cat's tongue (long and flat). They are sweet and crunchy.
Makmur		Malay	Pastry	A traditional Malay pastry, made from butter, ghee and flour. Usually served during special occasion of Eid ul-Fitr.
Kue pancong, bandros or gandos		Jakarta and West Java	Pastry	This cake is made from rice flour and coconut-based batter and cooked in a special mold pan, sprinkled with granulated sugar. Its shape is similar to kue pukis.
Kue pukis		Nationwide	Pastry	This cake is made from egg mixture, granulated sugar, flour, yeast and coconut milk. The mixture is then poured into a half-moon mold and baked on fire (not oven). Pukis can be said to be actually a modification of waffles.
Kue putri salju		Nationwide	Cookie	A type of cookie which is crescent-shaped and coated with powdered sugar covered like snow.
Kue rangi		Betawi and Javanese	Pastry	A Betawi traditional cake that made from a mixture of starch with grated coconut which is baked with a special mold on a small stove.
Kue satu		Java	Cookie	White-colored traditional cookie with sweet mung beans powder that is crumbled when being bitten.
Kue sus		Nationwide	Pastry	A baked pastry filled with soft and moist cream made from the mixture of milk, sugar and flour.
Kukis jagung		Nationwide	Cookie	A type of cookie prepared with corn products.
Ladyfinger		Nationwide	Biscuit	A low density, dry, egg-based, sweet sponge biscuits roughly shaped like a large finger.
Laklak		Bali	Pancake	Balinese traditional little pancake with grated coconut and melted palm sugar.
Lapis legit or spekuk		Nationwide	Layered cake	A spiced layered cake, made mainly of egg yolk, flour and margarine/butter.
Mochi		Chinese Indonesian and Japanese Indonesian	Sweet rice cake	Rice flour based cake filled with peanuts paste, sometimes sprinkled with sesame seeds.
Nastar		Nationwide	Pastry	It has round shape with a diameter of about 2 centimetres. The pineapple jam is filled inside instead of spread on top. The cookie is often decorated with small pieces of cloves or raisins on top of it.
Onde-onde		Nationwide	Pastry, rice ball	Glutinous rice cake balls, filled with sweet green beans paste, and rolled in sesame seed and then fried.
Pinyaram		Minangkabau and Malay	Cake	A traditional cake made from mixture of white sugar or palm sugar, white rice flour or black rice, and coconut milk.
Semprong		Nationwide	Egg roll	A wafer snack made by clasping egg batter using an iron mold which is heated up on a charcoal stove.
Serabi		Java	Pancake	Rice pancake that is made from rice flour with coconut milk or shredded coconut as an emulsifier.
Spekulaas		Nationwide	Biscuit, cookie	A thin, very crunchy, caramelized, and slightly browned cookie, derived from Dutch cuisine.
Stroopwafel		Nationwide	Waffle	A wafer cookie made from two thin layers of baked dough joined by a caramel filling.
Terang bulan		Nationwide	Pancake	Originally a Chinese snack, but nowadays it is labelled as murtabak.
Untir-untir		Java	Doughnut, fried dish	Dough twist that is fried in peanut oil. It has a shiny and golden look with crispy taste.
Wajik		Nationwide, but especially Javanese	Sweets	A diamond-shaped compressed sweet glutinous rice cake.
Wingko		Semarang, Central Java	Coconut cake	A sweet baked coconut cake. This dish almost similar to bibingka.

=== Crackers, chips, and crisps ===
Name	Image	Region/Popularity	Type	Description
Amplang		Java and Kalimantan	Cracker	Savoury fish cracker snack, made from wahoo or any type of Spanish mackerel.
Emping		Nationwide	Cracker	Crackers made from flattened Gnemon/Belinjo seeds.
Intip		Java	Cracker	Similar to rengginang but larger. A traditional thick scorched rice cracker, made from cooked rice that stuck in the inner part of rice pot, seasoned with salt.
Kemplang		Malay and Palembangese	Cracker	Savoury fish cracker snack, made from wahoo or any type of Spanish mackerel. This dish is similar to amplang.
Keripik		Nationwide	Crisps, chips	A traditional chips or crisps, bite-size snack crackers that can be savoury or sweet.
Keripik pisang		Nationwide	Crisps, chips	Crispy banana chips.
Keripik sanjai		Minangkabau	Crisps, chips	Sliced cassava chips.
Keripik teripang		Surabaya, Gresik, and Lamongan in East Java	Crisps, chips	A traditional chips or crisps made of dried sea cucumber.
Kerupuk		Nationwide	Cracker, crisps	Deep fried crisps made from mainly tapioca flour, with added ingredients, such as prawn, fish, or garlic, and even ox/cow skin. It comes in different shapes and colours.
Kerupuk kulit sapi or kerbau		Nationwide	Cracker, crisps	Cow or buffalo skin crackers.
Kerupuk kulit babi		Chinese Indonesian and Balinese	Cracker, crisps	Pork skin crackers.
Kerupuk ikan		Nationwide	Cracker	A deep fried snack made from starch and fish.
Kerupuk udang		Nationwide	Cracker	A deep fried snack made from starch and prawn.
Rempeyek		Nationwide, but especially Javanese	Cracker	A deep-fried savoury Javanese cracker, made from flour with other ingredients, bound or coated by crispy flour batter.
Rengginang		Nationwide	Cracker	A traditional thick rice cracker, made from cooked glutinous sticky rice and seasoned with spices. This dish made into a flat and rounded-shape.
Sale pisang		Java	Crisps, chips	A chips-like snack that made of bananas which are combed thin and then dried in the sun. After dried in the sun, it can be directly eaten or fried first.

== Seeds, beans and peanuts ==
Name	Image	Region/Popularity	Type	Description
Beton or biji nangka rebus		Java and Sumatra	Jackfruit seed	Boiled jackfruit seeds seasoned with salt.
Jagung goreng		Nationwide but more common in East Nusa Tenggara	Fried corn	Crispy deep fried crispy corn kernels, consumed in similar fashion as fried peanuts. The type of corn used is the one that do not explode in the heat like popcorns.
Kacang disko or kacang Bali		Bali	Deep fried peanut, Fried peanut	Deep fried peanuts coated with crispy batter and seasoned with flavourings; sugar and salt, a popular accompaniment for beer.
Kacang goreng or kacang bawang		Nationwide	Deep fried peanut, Fried peanut	Deep fried peanuts with garlic.
Kacang mede or kacang mete		Nationwide	Deep fried cashew	Deep fried cashew nuts
Kacang tolo or roay		Nationwide	Fried pea	Deep fried peas with salt.
Kuaci		Nationwide	Edible plant seeds	A baked plant seeds, it can be sunflower or pumpkin seeds.
Pilus, kacang pilus, kacang sukro or kacang atom		Nationwide	Tapioca pearl snack	Pilus is deep fried tapioca balls, while kacang pilus or kacang sukro is peanut coated with tapioca.

== Sweet desserts ==
Name	Image	Region/Popularity	Type	Description
Agar-agar		Nationwide	Jelly	Puddings flavoured jellies like almond tofu, as well as fruit aspics.
Angsle		Java		A mix of melinjo, glutinous rice, peanut, sago pearl, white bread, coconut milk, screwpine leaf, ginger and milk.
Asida		Maluku Islands	Pudding	A dish made up of a cooked wheat flour lump of dough, sometimes with added butter or honey. It is popular during Ramadan.
Bibingka		Eastern Indonesia	Cake	A type of cake made with rice flour, sugar, clarified butter, and coconut milk. Usually served during Christmas.
Bika ambon		Medan, North Sumatra	Cake	A type of cake made with as tapioca flour, eggs, sugar, yeast and coconut milk. The yeast creates bubbles, which creates sponge-like holes and gives it a unique spongy texture when it is baked. It is generally sold in pandan and banana flavor, but today it is also available in durian, cheese and chocolate flavour.
Cincau		Nationwide	Jelly	A jelly-like dessert, made using the Platostoma palustre and has a mild, slightly bitter taste. It is served chilled, with other toppings such as fruit, or in bubble tea or other drinks.
Cendil		Java	Sweets, coconut cake	Rice flour-based small glutinous cake, sweetened with sugar, moulded and coloured. Served with fresh grated coconut.
Dodol or jenang		Java	Sweets	Rice flour-based small glutinous sweets, sweetened with coconut sugar, moulded and coloured. Often add fruit scent and taste such as durian.
Es lilin		Nationwide	Frozen dessert, ice cream	Various flavors ice cream with wooden sticks.
Geplak		Yogyakarta	Sweets	Sweets made from sugar and grated coconut.
Kochi		Malay, Javanese, and Peranakan	Dumpling	A cake dumpling made from glutinous rice flour, and stuffed with coconut fillings with palm sugar.
Kolak		Nationwide	Sweet cocktail	A mix of sweet potato, cassava, banana, pumpkin, diced in bite size pieces and stewed in coconut milk and palm sugar. Sometimes vanilla or ginger are added for extra flavour.
Kue bingka		Banjarese	Cake	A cake made of mashed potato, flour, eggs, sugar, coconut milk, vanilla, milk and margarine, all mixed as dough and baked until golden brown and cooked.
Kue bugis		Makassarese, Buginese, and Javanese	Cake	A traditional snack of soft glutinous rice flour cake, filled with sweet grated coconut.
Kue cubit		Nationwide	Cake	This cake is called kue cubit because of its small size: to eat it one has to pinch it.
Kue cucur		Nationwide	Pancake	Pancake made of fried rice flour batter and coconut sugar.
Kue lapis		Nationwide	Pudding, layered cake	A traditional snack of colourful layered soft rice flour pudding.
Kue lumpur surga		Nationwide	Cake	Cake made from coconut milk, potatoes, flour, and eggs shaped like mud.
Kue maksuba		Palembangese	Layered cake	A traditional layered cake which is mainly made with duck egg and sweetened condensed milk without any flours. Each cake needs approximately more than two dozens of duck eggs.
Kue mangkok		Java	Cupcake	Traditional steamed cupcake, similar to bolu kukus.
Kue putri salju		Nationwide	Cookie	A type of cookie which is crescent-shaped and coated with powdered sugar covered like snow.
Kue putu		Nationwide	Sweet coconut cake	Similar to klepon, except that it's cylindrical in shape whilst klepon is spherical.
Lupis		Java	Glutinous rice cake	Glutinous rice cake wrapped and cooked in banana leaves, served with grated coconut and drizzled with thick coconut sugar syrup.
Madumongso		Java	Sweets	This snack made from black sticky rice as a basic ingredient. The taste is mixed with sweet because the black rice is previously processed before it becomes tapai (through the fermentation process) and cooked become dodol.
Nata de coco		Nationwide	Confectionery, jelly, candy, fermented food	A jelly-like food produced by the fermentation of coconut water, which gels through the production of microbial cellulose by Komagataeibacter xylinus.
Pai susu		Bali	Pastry	A type of custard tart that consisting of an outer pastry crust filled with egg custard as well as condensed milk and baked.
Pastel de nata		Jakarta and Timor Island	Pastry	An egg tart pastry dusted with cinnamon, derived from Portuguese cuisine.
Poffertjes		Nationwide	Pancake	Similar to kue cubit. This cake has a light and spongy texture.
Puding sagu		Sumatra and Eastern Indonesia	Pudding	A sweet pudding made by boiling sago with either water or milk and adding sugar and sometimes additional flavourings.
Putu mangkok		Nationwide	Dumpling, sweet coconut cake	A round-shaped, traditional steamed rice flour kue or sweet snack filled with palm sugar. This dish is similar to kue putu.
Putu mayang		Nationwide, but especially Betawi	String hoppers	Made from starch or rice flour shaped like noodles, with a mixture of coconut milk, and served with kinca or liquid javanese sugar.
Seri muka		Banjarese and Malay	Pudding, layered cake	A two-layered dessert with steamed glutinous rice forming the bottom half and a green custard layer made with pandan juice.
Tapai		Nationwide	Fermented food	A traditional fermented food of rice or other starchy foods. It has a sweet or sour taste.

== Cheeses ==
Name	Image	Region/Popularity	Type	Description
Dali ni horbo		North Sumatra	Cheese	A cheese-like traditional dish, with a yellowish white appearance with tofu-like texture and milky flavor. Dali is made by boiling buffalo milk coagulated with papaya leaf or unripe pineapple juice.
Dangke		South Sulawesi	Cheese	A traditional cheese that made from buffalo or cow milk. This dish is processed by boiling fresh milk with sliced papaya leaves, stems, or unripe papaya fruits. Dangke is typically soaked in a brine solution overnight before being wrapped with banana leaves for masking the bitter taste caused by the addition of papaya leaves.
Edam		Nationwide	Cheese	A Dutch cheese made of cows or goats milk. Generally the edam cheese used for cooking kaasstengels.
Litsusu cologanti		Lesser Sunda Islands	Cheese	A type of cheese, with enzymes from litsusu tree as coagulant.

== Beverages ==
=== Hot beverages ===
Name	Image	Region	Type	Description
Air guraka		Ternate, North Maluku	Hot ginger drink	A ginger drink mixed with palm sugar and walnuts.
Bajigur		West Java	Hot sweet drink	Coconut sugar and coconut milk hot drink.
Bandrek		West Java	Hot sweet drink	A coconut sugar and ginger hot drink with bits of young coconut.
Java coffee				
Jahe Telor				A drink made of ginger and raw egg. Some variants colloquially known as STMJ (Susu Telor Madu Jahe or "milk egg honey ginger").
Kembang tahu		Nationwide		Tofu pudding with sweet ginger soup
Kopi dabe		Tidore, North Maluku	Coffee beverage	Coffee beverage mixed with ginger, nutmeg, cinnamon, clove, and pandan leaves.
Kopi durian		Sumatra	Coffee beverage	Coffee beverage mixed with durian as a replacement of sugar
Kopi hijau		Tulungagung, East Java	Coffee beverage	
Kopi jahe		Nationwide	Coffee beverage	Coffee beverage mixed with ginger
Kopi joss		Yogyakarta	Coffee beverage	Unrestrained coffee beverage served with a piece of burning charcoal immersed
Kopi kasar/kopyok		Gresik, East Java	Coffee beverage	
Kopi kawa		West Sumatra	Coffee beverage	Not an actual coffee; it's a beverage made of roasted coffee leaves
Kopi khop		Aceh	Coffee beverage	
Kopi kothok		Cepu, Central Java; Padangan, East Java	Coffee beverage	
Kopi lelet		Lasem, Central Java	Coffee beverage	
Kopi luwak		Sumatra, Java, Sulawesi, and Nusa Tenggara	Coffee beverage	Coffee beverage made of beans that are already digested by palm civet.
Kopi pala		Banda Islands	Coffee beverage	Coffee beverage mixed with nutmeg
Kopi pinogu		Suwawa, Gorontalo	Coffee beverage	
Kopi rarobang		Ambon, Maluku	Coffee beverage	Coffee beverage mixed with spices and walnuts
Kopi sanger		Aceh	Coffee beverage	Pulled coffee and milk
Kopi santan		Blora, Central Java	Coffee beverage	Coffee beverage mixed with coconut milk
Kopi talua		West Sumatra	Coffee beverage	Hot coffee beverage mixed blended egg yolk
Kopi takar		Mandailing Natal, North Sumatra	Coffee beverage	Coffee beverage and palm sugar served with cinnamon stick and coconut cup
Kopi tarik		Riau Islands	Coffee beverage	Pulled coffee and milk
Kopi tubruk		Java	Coffee beverage	Hot coffee beverage mix straight with coffee powder without straining.
Sara'ba		South Sulawesi, Makassar	Hot Drink	A drink made of palm sugar/brown sugar and ginger. It can be mixed with coconut milk, milk or raw egg yolk.
Sekoteng		Chinese Indonesian, Nationwide	Hot ginger drink	A hot drink made of ginger, sugar and milk with peanuts, slices of bread, and pacar cina.
Serbat				
Susu jahe pinang			Milk beverage	A hot drink made of milk, ginger, and areca palm fruit
Susu Telur Madu Jahe (STMJ)		Central Java, East Java	Milk beverage	A hot drink made of milk, egg yolk, honey and ginger
Teh bawang dayak		Kalimantan	Herbal tea beverage	A herbal tea made from dried shallot peels.
Teh manis panas			Tea beverage	A hot tea mixed with sugar.
Teh poci		Tegal	Tea beverage	Hot tea served in clay teapot with large crystallized sugar.
Teh sarang semut		Merauke, Papua	Herbal tea beverage	A herbal tea made from musamus or Macrotermes house.
Teh talua		West Sumatra	Tea beverage	Mixed of hot tea and blended egg yolk.
Teh tarik		Riau Islands	Tea beverage	Pulled sweet milk tea
Wedang angsle		East Java		
Wedang jahe		Central Java	Ginger tea/drink	Made of fresh ginger, boiled and mixed with palm sugar or granulated cane sugar. Served hot or warm.
Wedang kacang tanah		Semarang		A hot drink made from peanuts.
Wedang kalau batuk		Batak and Java		
Wedang ronde		Yogyakarta	Hot ginger drink	
Wedang tape		Central Java, East Java		A hot drink made from tape (glutinous rice tape or cassava tape).
Wedang uwuh		Yogyakarta		A hot drink with a bright red color and a fragrant aroma. with the composition: ginger, rock sugar, secang, nutmeg, cinnamon, lemongrass, cloves, and cardamom.

=== Cold beverages ===
Name	Image	Region	Type	Description
Bandung		Bandung, West Java	Beverage	A beverage consists of milk flavoured with rose cordial syrup, giving a pink colour. It is popular during ramadan.
Beras kencur		Java	Herbal drink	Made from rice, turmeric, and brown sugar.
Bir kocok		Bogor, West Java	Ginger drink	Shaken ginger drink with ice
Bir pletok		Jakarta	Ginger drink	Shaken ginger drink with ice
Dadiah		West Sumatra	Yoghurt	Traditional West Sumatran water buffalo milk yoghurt.
Es asam jawa or air gula asam		Central Java and Yogyakarta	Tamarind drink	A cold drink made from the juice of asam jawa served with palm sugar and ice.
Es air mata pengantin		Riau	Cold drink	A cold drink consists of the three layer colorful grated agar jelly and basil seeds.
Es blewah		Nationwide	Fruit cocktail	A cold drink made from the fruit of blewah.
Es buah		Nationwide	Fruit cocktail	A cold drink from fruit, ice, syrup and condensed milk
Es campur		Nationwide	Sweet dessert	Shaved ice with coconut pieces, various fruits (usually jackfruit), grass jelly, syrup and condensed milk
Es cao		Central Java and East Java	Jelly drink	A cold drink made from black grass jelly with cocopandan syrup.
Es cendol		Nationwide	Sweet jelly drink	Rice flour jelly with green natural coloring from pandan leaf, mixed with coconut milk, shaved ice and palm/brown sugar
Es cincau		Nationwide	Jelly drink	Grass jelly and shredded ice with sugar or syrup.
Es dawet		Banjarnegara, Central Java	Cold dessert	
Es doger		Bandung, West Java	Cold sweet dessert	Cold and sweet coconut ice dessert with syrup and various fillings.
Es durian		Nationwide	Cold sweet dessert	A type of ice cream made from Durian.
Es goyobod		West Java	Cold sweet dessert	
Es gempol		Central Java	Cold sweet dessert	Rice flour dough doused with coconut milk soup
Es jeruk		Nationwide	Cold drink	Juice of sweet orange with sugar and ice
Es kelacin		West Sulawesi	Cold drink	Flesh coconut mixed with green grass jelly in an iced coconut milk soup.
Es kelapa muda		Nationwide	Cold drink	Fresh young coconut, coconut water mixed with or without syrup. Usually served intact whole fruit
Es kopi susu gula aren		Nationwide	Cold drink	Iced coffee with milk and palm sugar.
Es kuwut		Bali	Cold drink	Consists of coconut, citrus, honeydew, and selasih (basil seeds).
Es laksamana mengamuk		Riau Islands	Cold dessert	Fresh mango with milk.
Es lidah buaya		West Kalimantan	Cold drink	Made from aloe vera, French basil, Javanese black jelly, coconut milk, palm sugar, pandanus leaf, and sugar.
Es matoa		Papua	Cold drink	Made from matoa fruit, kolang-kaling (aren palm fruit), and jelly.
Es omu		Gorontalo	Cold drink	Made from coconut flesh, coconut water, and palm sugar.
Es pisang ijo		South Sulawesi	Cold dessert	Sweet green battered banana with rice pudding.
Es puter		Java	Ice cream	Ice cream that made from coconut milk with a rough texture and traditionally frozen.
Es samudra		Dumai, Riau	Cold drink	Consists of white bread, durian, seaweed, and cocopandan syrup.
Es sekemu		Banten	Cold drink	Consists of coconut water, coconut flesh, sapodilla, and basil seeds.
Es selendang mayang		Jakarta	Cold dessert	Iced coconut milk soup with rice and palm flour jelly.
Es serbat kweni		Lampung	Cold drink	Made from mango kweni and palm sugar.
Es sinom		Surabaya	Cold drink	Made from sinom (tamarind leaves), turmeric, and sugar.
Es siwalan		Nationwide	Cold dessert	
Es sunset papua		Papua	Cold drink	Mixed of orange juice, carrot juice, syrup, and basil seeds.
Es teh tarik		Riau Islands	Sweet iced tea	Sweet pulled milk tea with ice
Es tebu		Java		Extract of sugarcane with ice.
Es teler		Nationwide		A mixed of avocado, young coconut, jack fruit, shredded iced with sweet condensed milk.
Es timun serut		Aceh	Cold drink	Made from cucumber.
Jamu		Nationwide	Herbal drink	
Jus alpukat		Nationwide	Juice	Avocado juice with chocolate condensed milk.
Jus buah naga		Nationwide	Juice	Purple pitaya juice
Jus belimbing		Depok, West Java	Juice	Carambola juice
Jus durian		Nationwide	Juice	Durian juice.
Jus gandaria		Ambon	Juice	Mango-plum juice.
Jus lidah buaya		Depok, West Java	Juice	Aloe vera juice.
Jus markisa		Depok, West Java	Juice	Passion fruit juice.
Jus martabe		Medan	Juice	Mixed of passion fruit juice and tamarillo juice.
Jus nanas		Nationwide	Juice	Pineapple juice.
Jus patikala		Southeast Sulawesi	Juice	Kecombrang fruit juice
Jus rumput laut		Depok, West Java	Juice	Edible seaweed juice.
Jus tala'		Jeneponto	Juice	Palmyra fruit juice.
Jus terung belanda		Sumatra and Sulawesi	Juice	Tamarillo juice.
Lahang		West Java	Cold sweet beverage	Drink made from Arenga pinnata (aren) sap.
Legen		East Java		A drink made of Siwalan palm sap.
Liang teh		Chinese Indonesian, Medan, North Sumatra	Sweet iced tea	
Minas		Sinjai	Cold drink	A drink made from tapai, milk, duck egg, coconut water, and honey.
Sari temulawak		Java	Herbal drink	A juice of Java ginger.
Soda gembira		Nationwide	Cold drink	
Soda susu		Nationwide	Cold drink	
Sweet iced tea (es teh manis)		Nationwide	Cold drink	

=== Alcoholic beverages ===
Name	Image	Region	Type	Description
Anggur		Nationwide	Wine	Sweet wine produced by Orang Tua brand
Arak		Nationwide		
Balo		South Sulawesi		
Bir Bintang		Nationwide	Beer	Local brand beer
Brem		Bali; Madiun (solid form)	Sweet alcoholic beverage	Brem is made from fermented tape. Brem is a special beverage from Bali. Usually brem also present in solid form as snacks.
Cap Tikus		North Sulawesi		
Ciu		Central Java		
Congyang		Semarang, Central Java		
Cukrik		Surabaya, East Java		
Lapen		Yogyakarta		
Moke		Flores, East Nusa Tenggara		
Saguer		North Sulawesi		
Sopi		Maluku; East Nusa Tenggara		
Swansrai		Papua		
Tuak		Nationwide		

== Seasonings and condiments ==
Name	Image	Region	Type	Description
Abon		Nationwide	Sprinkle dry condiments	A dried meat product with a light and fluffy texture similar to coarse cotton. Made of beef, chicken, or fish and similar to serundeng.
Balado		Minangkabau	Sauce	Hot and spicy bumbu that made by stir frying ground red hot chili pepper with other spices including garlic, shallot, tomato and key lime juice in coconut or palm oil.
Bawang goreng		Nationwide	Garnish	Crispy fried onions or shallots sprinkled upon various dishes to give aroma and crispy texture.
Budu		Sumatra, Riau Islands, and West Kalimantan	Sauce	An anchovies sauce.
Bumbu kacang		Nationwide	Sauce	A sauce made from ground roasted or fried peanuts. This sauce used with chicken, meat, and vegetables, adding flavor to grilled skewered meat, such as satays, poured over vegetables as salad dressing, or as dipping sauce.
Colo-colo		Maluku	Sauce	Chopped red chili peppers, bird's eye chili, shallots, red and green tomatoes, and a pinch of salt and sugar, mixed with fresh calamansi juice, served in black coconut oil residue, or caramelized rarobang (watery residue of coconut oil-making process), or today often replaced with kecap manis sweet soy sauce.
Dabu-dabu		North Sulawesi	Sauce	Sliced chili, tomatoes and shallots. Condiments for grilled fish.
Hagelslag or meses		Nationwide	Sweet sprinkles	A very small pieces of confectionery used as a decoration or to add texture to desserts such as brownies, cupcakes, doughnuts or ice cream. The tiny candies are produced in a variety of colors and are generally used as a topping or a decorative element.
Kecap manis and kecap asin		Nationwide	Sauce	Soy sauces, available in sweet (manis) and salty (asin).
Kerisik		Malay	Sprinkle dry condiments	A condiment that made from coconut with dark brown colour. This condiment used in Malay cuisine, such as rendang and laksa.
Mayones		Nationwide	Sauce	A thick cold condiment or dressing commonly used in sandwiches, salads, or fritters.
Muisjes		Nationwide	Sweet sprinkles	Traditional bread topping that made of aniseeds with a sugared and colored outer layer. This dish derived from Dutch cuisine.
Pecel		Java	Sauce	A mixture of vegetables and a type of traditional cracker with spicy peanut paste. Madiun and blitar in East Java are popular for their pecel.
Petis		Java	Sauce	A black coloured shrimp paste that popular in Java. This condiments usually used with laksa, popiah, rujak cingur, dan rujak petis. Petis can also be made from fish or krill that have been coated in salt and fermented for up to two years.
Rica-rica		Manado, North Sulawesi	Spicy sauce	Sauce made of rich chopped chilies.
Sambal		Nationwide	Spicy sauce	Chili sauce with rich variants across Indonesia, among other uses shrimp paste.
Sambal goreng teri		Nationwide	Spicy sauce, salted anchovy	Spicy salted anchovy with peanuts.
Saus tiram		Nationwide	Sauce	Oyster sauce with dark coloured.
Selai kacang		Nationwide	Spreads	A food paste or spread made from ground, dry-roasted peanuts.
Selai serikaya		Nationwide	Spreads	A sweet creamy coconut spread made from coconut milk (locally known as santan) and duck or chicken eggs (which are flavored with pandan leaf and sweetened with sugar).
Tauco		Nationwide	Sauce	Tauco is a paste made from preserved fermented yellow soybeans.
Tempoyak		Sumatra and Kalimantan	Fermented food spicy condiment	Durian fermented with mixture of salt for three to five days, mixed with ground chili and shrimp paste.
Terasi or belacan		Nationwide	Shrimp paste	A dried shrimp paste, is usually purchased in dark blocks, but is also sometimes sold ground as granulated coarse powder.
Tumpang		Java	Sauce	Tumpang or sambal tumpang is a typical food from Kediri, East Java. Sambal tumpang has been made of rotten tempeh mixed and cooked with various spices such as chili, onion, salt and other spices.

== Common ingredients ==
=== Spices ===
- Anise (Adas Manis)
- Asam kandis (dried fruit of Garcinia xanthochymus)
- Asam sunti (dried fruit of Averrhoa bilimbi)
- Candlenuts (Kemiri)
- Cardamom (Kapulaga)
- Chili (Cabai)
- Cinnamon (Kayu Manis)
- Clove (Cengkeh)
- Coriander seeds (Ketumbar)
- Cumin seeds (Jinten)
- Fennel (Adas)
- Fenugreek (Klabet)
- Fingerroot (Temu Kunci)
- Galangal (Lengkuas)
- Garcinia atroviridis (Asam Gelugur)
- Garlic (Bawang putih)
- Shallot (Bawang merah)
- Onion (Bawang bombay)
- Ginger (Jahe)
- Kaempferia galanga (Kencur)
- Nutmeg (Pala)
- Pangium edule (Kluwak)
- Star anise (Pekak, bunga lawang)
- Tamarind seeds (Asam)
- Torch ginger (Kecombrang, Etlingera elatior)
- Turmeric (Kunyit)
- Zingiber zerumbet (Lempuyang)

=== Herbs ===
- Indonesian bay leaves (daun salam)
- Kaffir lime Leaves (daun jeruk purut)
- Lemongrass (serai)
- Pandan (Pandanus amaryllifolius, a variety of Pandanus, used to add a distinct aroma to some dishes and desserts)
- Lemon Basil (kemangi)
- Lime Leaves (daun jeruk)
- Turmeric Leaves (daun kunyit)
- Celery leaves (daun seledri)

== Vegetables ==
- Aloe vera (lidah buaya)
- Asparagus
- Broccoli (brokoli)
- Carrot (wortel)
- Cassava (singkong)
- Cassava leaves (daun singkong)
- Cauliflower (kembang kol)
- Cabbage (kol)
- Celery (seledri)
- Chayote
- Chayote gourd (labu siam)
- Corn (jagung)
- Cucumber (timun)
- Eggplant (terong)
- Jicama (bengkuang)
- Sweetcorn (jagung muda)
- Sweet potato (kentang manis / ubi)
- Snap peas (kapri)
- Leek (bawang prei)
- Mushroom (jamur); various Mushroom species, Button mushroom, Oyster mushroom and more
- Shallot (bawang merah), small red onions (Allium ascalonicum), as also used in south India; more common than large onions (Allium cepa, bawang Bombay)
- Garlic (bawang putih)
- Leaf amaranth (bayam/bayem); various Amaranthus species, often incorrectly called spinach though they belong to the same family as Spinacia oleracea
- Bok choi, pak choi (sawi hijau)
- Napa cabbage (sawi putih)
- Choi sum (caisim)
- Kailan
- Chives (kucai)
- White carrot (lobak)
- Water convolvulus (kangkung)
- Green beans (buncis, kacang buncis)
- Long beans (kacang panjang)
- Winged beans (kecipir)
- Bitter gourd (pare)
- Beansprout (tauge)
- Potato (kentang)
- Peas (kacang polong)
- Pumpkin (labu)
- Taro (keladi)
- Taro leaves (daun keladi)
- Tomato (tomat)
- Luffa (oyong)
- Okra (okra)
- Papaya leaves (daun pepaya)
- Yellow velvetleaf (genjer)
- Belinjau (leaves and fruits of Gnetum gnemon)
- Young jackfruit (nangka muda)
- Banana flower (jantung pisang)
- Young Rattan stem tips (Pucuk rotan muda (Pakkat))

== Fruits ==
- Apple - Apel
- Avocado - Alpukat
- Baccaurea racemosa - Menteng
- Banana - Pisang
- Bouea macrophylla - Gandaria
- Breadfruit - Buah roti
- Star Fruit - Belimbing
- Coconut - Kelapa
- Dragon fruit - Buah naga
- Duku - Duku
- Durian - Durian
- Gnetum gnemon - Melinjo
- Guava - Jambu biji
- Grape - Anggur
- Jackfruit - Nangka
- Kaffir lime - Jeruk Obat / Jeruk Limau
- Lime - Jeruk Nipis
- Longan - Kelengkeng
- Lychee - Leci
- Mango - Mangga
- Mangosteen - Manggis
- Orange - Jeruk
- Papaya - Pepaya
- Passionfruit - Markisa
- Persimmon - Kesemek
- Pineapple - Nanas
- Pomelo - Jeruk Bali
- Pometia pinnata - Matoa
- Rambutan - Rambutan
- Snake Fruit - Salak
- Sapodilla - Sawo
- Soursop - Sirsak
- Spondias dulcis - Kedondong
- Syzygium malaccense - Jambu Bol
- Water apple - Jambu air
- Watermelon - Semangka

== Gallery ==
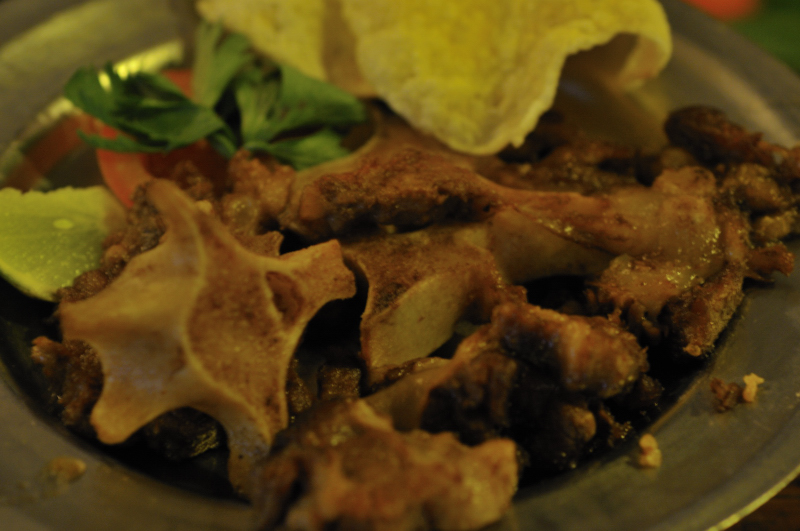
Sop Buntut Goreng

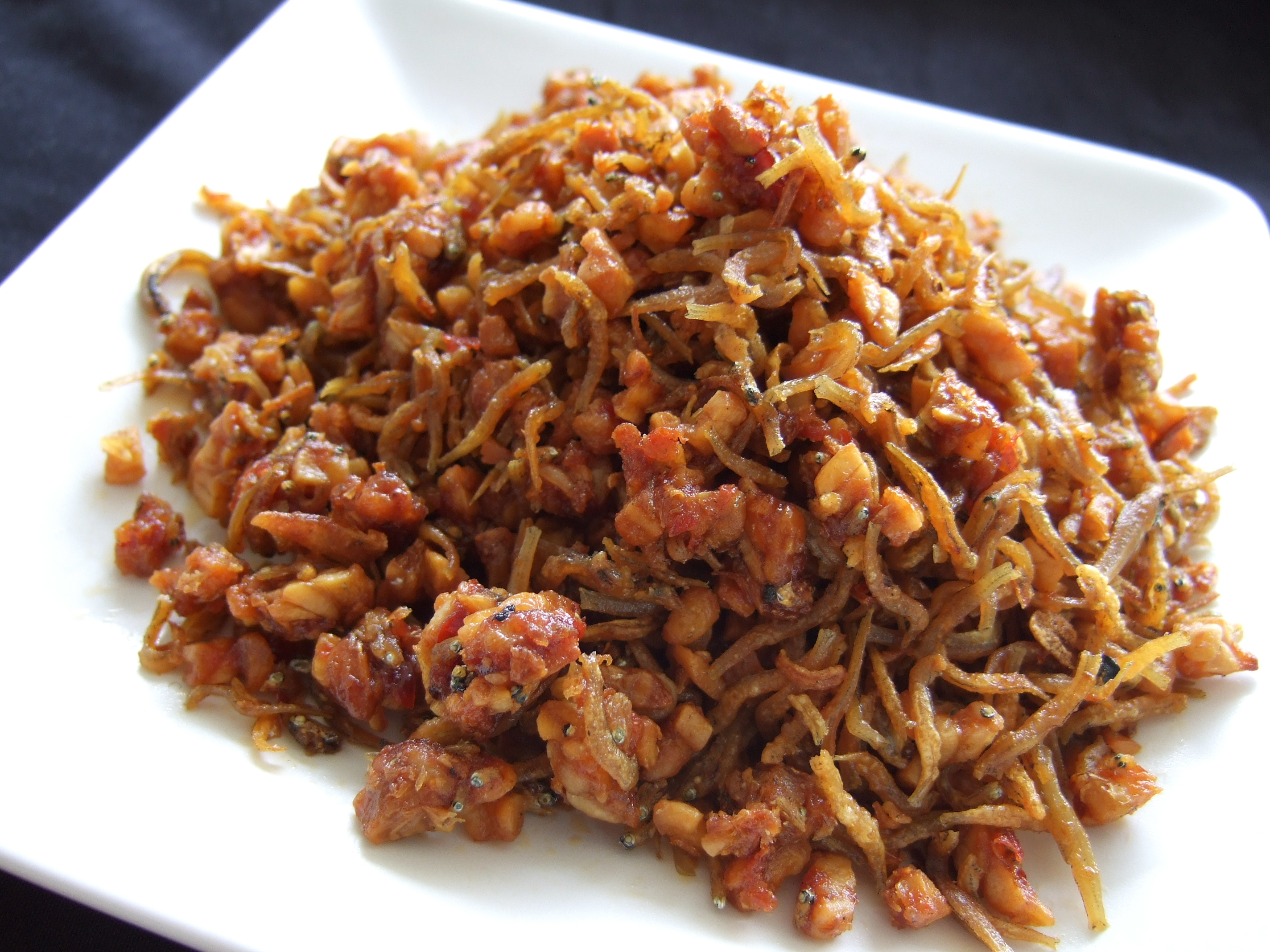
Sambal Goreng Teri Tempe

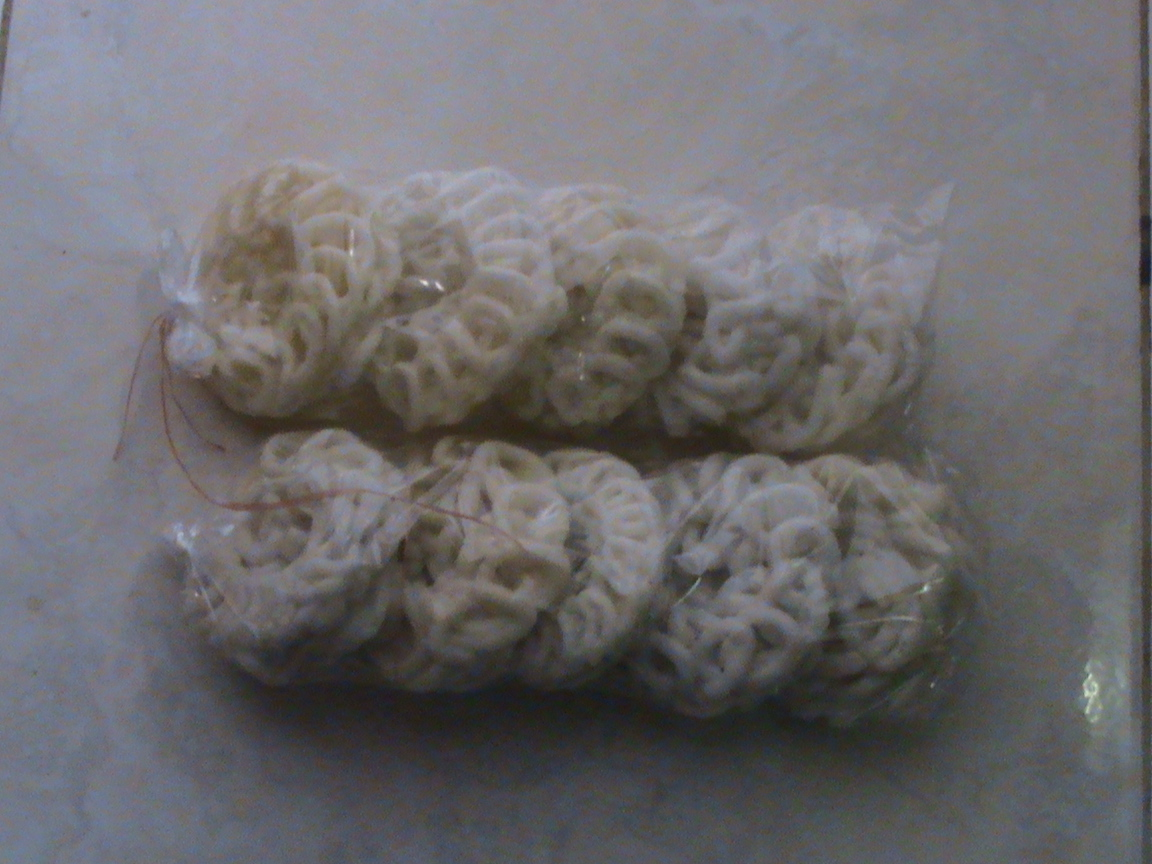
Krupuk

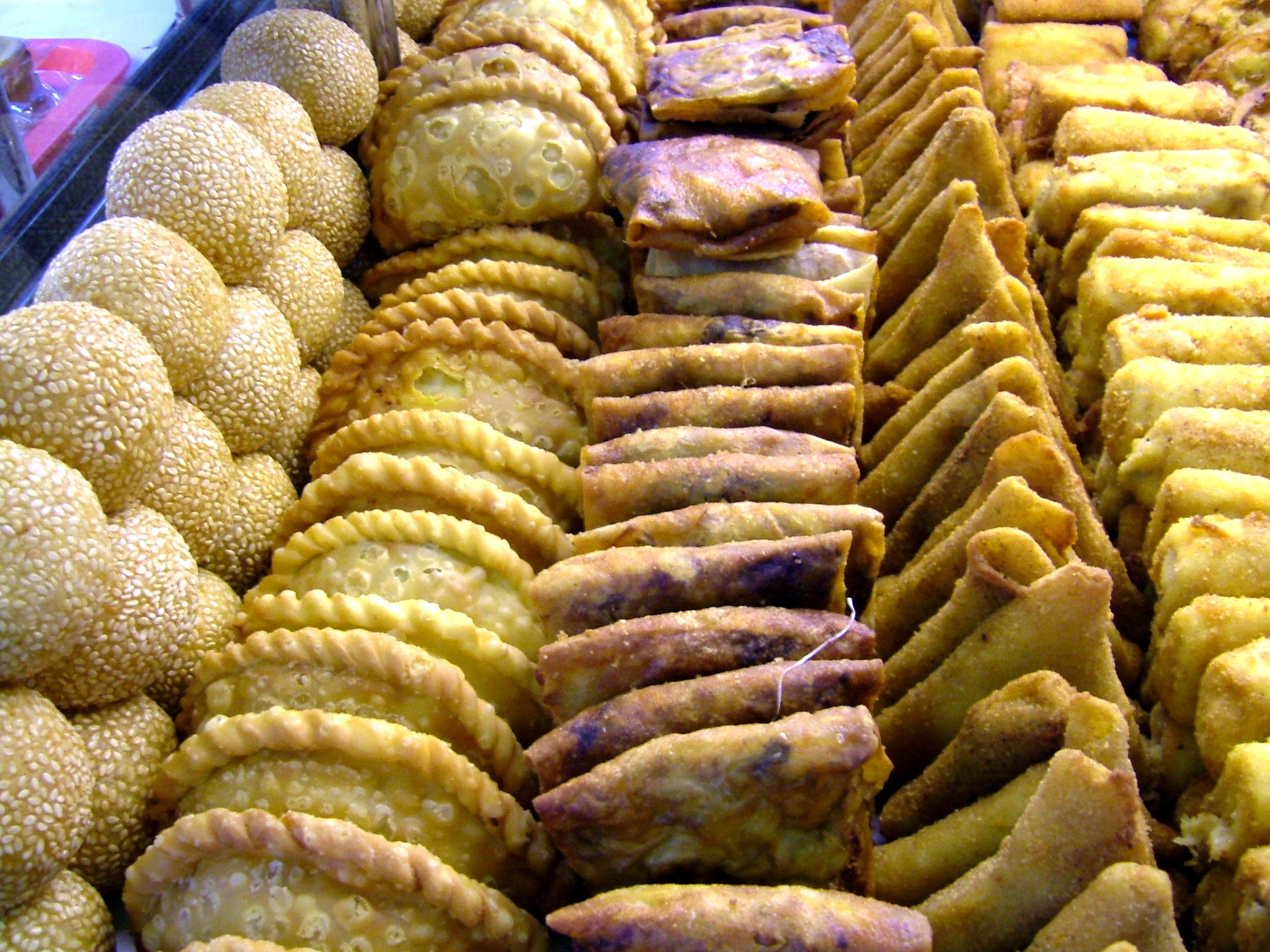
Indonesian snacks

== See also ==
- Cuisine of Indonesia
- List of cuisines
- List of Indonesian beverages
- List of Indonesian desserts
- List of Indonesian snacks
- List of Indonesian soups
- Street food of Indonesia
