= Nian Guangjiu =

Chinese entrepreneur

- 年广九
- Born: 17 January 1940 (other sources say 1935 or 1937); Huaiyuan County, Anhui, China
- Died: 11 January 2023 (aged 82); Wuhu, Anhui, China
- Spouse: Chen Huifang (陈慧芳)

Nian Guangjiu (Chinese: 年广九; pinyin: Nián Guǎngjiǔ; 17 January 1940 – 11 January 2023) was a Chinese entrepreneur from Huaiyuan County, Anhui. He produced and sold melon seeds under the brand name "Fool's Melon Seeds".

== Life ==
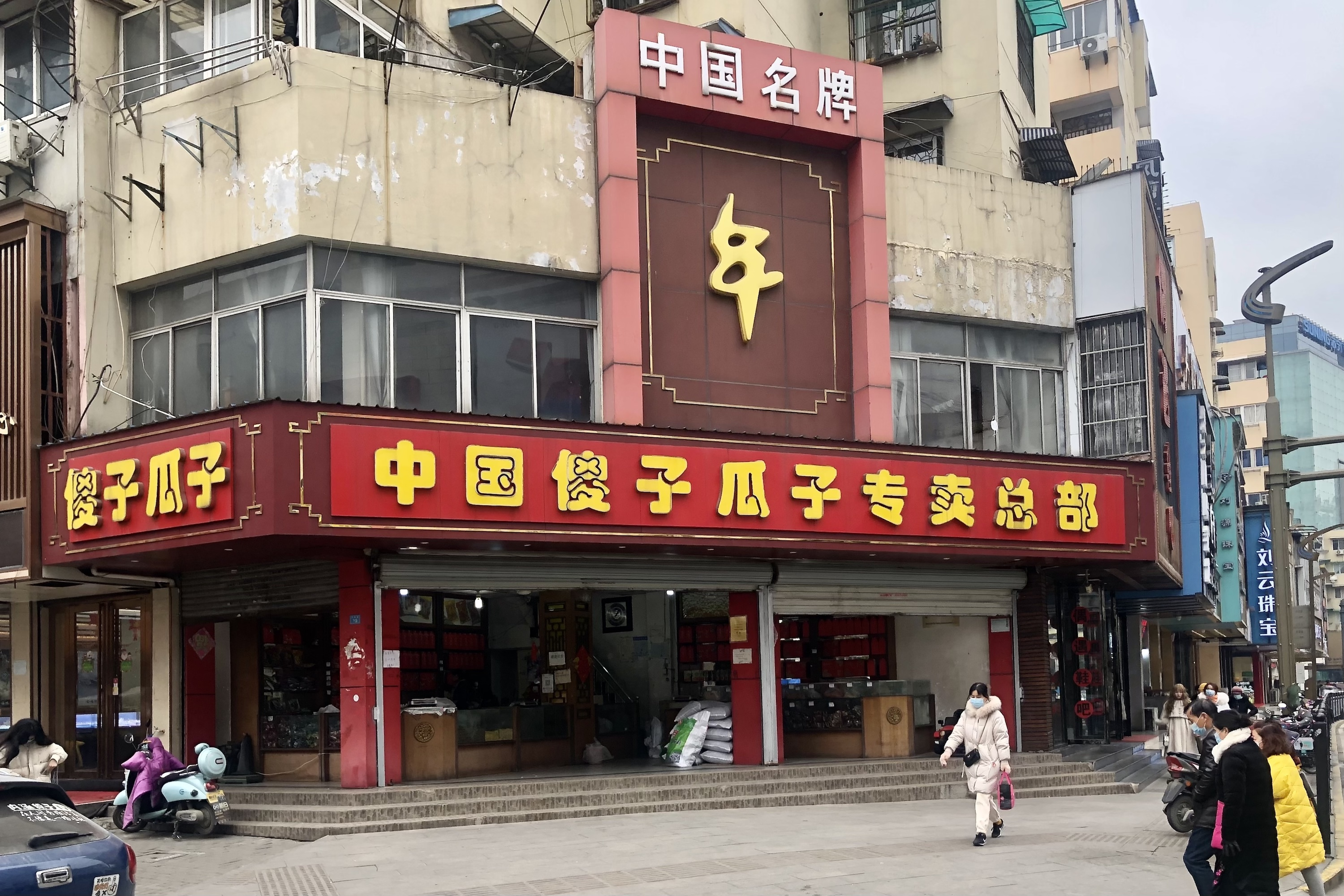
A Fool's Melon Seeds shop in Wuhu, Anhui

Nian Guangjiu was born in a Manchu family and grew up in poverty. Starting at age 9, he helped his parents sell fruit to earn a living. In 1963, he was convicted of "speculation and profiteering" (投机倒把罪) for selling fish; he was convicted to one year in prison and served five months. In 1966, he was imprisoned for more than 20 days as one of the "cow demons and snake spirits" vilified in the Cultural Revolution.

After he was released, he continued to engage in private enterprise, selling guazi (seeds eaten as snacks). Because melon seeds were rationed, it was illegal to sell them, and Nian Guangjiu repeatedly got in trouble with authorities for this activity. But his business was successful. His roasted seeds had a distinctive flavor, and he was known for his generous behavior when selling them. This led to people calling him a fool, and he accepted the term with pride, adopting the phrase "Fool's Melon Seeds" (Chinese: 傻子瓜子; pinyin: Shǎzi Guāzi) as his trademark. The goods continued to sell well, and by 1976 he had saved up 1 million RMB in profit.

At that time, before China's reform and opening up, few in the country were well off; even a family with 10,000 RMB to their names would be considered rich. Thus, Nian's 1 million RMB was seen as an astronomical figure. Because the sum was so large, Nian did not feel comfortable putting it in a bank but also knew that keeping it in his house would not be safe. So he wrapped the money in leather and buried it in his yard. After the 1976 Tangshan earthquake, he became concerned that if there was an earthquake in Wuhu and his house was destroyed, other people could dig up the money. So he dug up the money himself, but discovered that the banknotes had gotten moldy, so he spread them out in the sun. He later quipped that other families used their courtyards to dry grain in the sun, but he used his to dry money.

By the early 1980s, his increasingly large enterprise had more than 100 employees, which was against the country's labor policies at the time. He was reported to the authorities, and this caused his business to be discussed at the highest levels of the Chinese government. Chinese leader Deng Xiaoping opined that Nian's individual business activities did not pose a threat to the public ownership economy. Deng took a "wait and see" attitude, letting the business develop for the time being; as a result, Nian was not penalized.

As Nian's business thrived, he expanded to Shanghai. In 1983, the Wuhu government invited him to start a joint venture with a government entity; Nian initially refused, but later agreed. In August 1989, the Wuhu city procuratorial organ arrested Nian on charges of embezzlement and misappropriation of public funds. Because there was insufficient evidence of either crime, he was instead sentenced to three years' imprisonment for hooliganism, but this sentence was overturned by higher authorities.

After 2000, Nian transferred managerial authority over Fool's Melon Seeds to his sons and transitioned into retirement.

He died of natural causes in Wuhu on 11 January 2023.

== Personal life ==
Nian Guangjiu was married multiple times. In November 2006, his son Nian Jinbao (年金宝) died in a slum in Wuhu of what was found to be carbon monoxide poisoning. In November 2008, another son was kidnapped in Zhengzhou; the case drew the attention of city and province-level authorities, and after 32 hours he was rescued by police.

== Legacy ==
As a pioneering entrepreneur in post-1949 China, Nian remains a symbol of the country's market-oriented reforms and increasing support for private enterprise during the reform and opening up period. According to economist Keyu Jin, his successful business challenged Marxist orthodoxy, and the government's response signaled an opportunity for other entrepreneurs to start businesses. Nian became famous when Deng Xiaoping mentioned him in a speech in 1992.

Speaking after Nian's death, think tank researcher Tang Dajie said that his story "reminds us of unfair treatment meted out to private entrepreneurs, even to this day", whereas economist Sheng Hong said that the Fool's Melon Seeds story "showed the public how the government protected the private economy and enterprises".
