= Katemak =

Indonesian traditional food made from beef, sweet potatoes, and corn

Katemak is an Indonesian traditional dish from the East Nusa Tenggara Province. To prepare this dish, beef is boiled with sweet potatoes, sweet corn and some green vegetables such as cassava leaves and papaya leaves to make a soup. Some spices such as the small red onions, garlic and red chillies are added during cooking.

== See also ==
- List of Indonesian dishes
