= Laklak (food) =

Traditional Balinese pancake with grated coconut and melted palm sugar

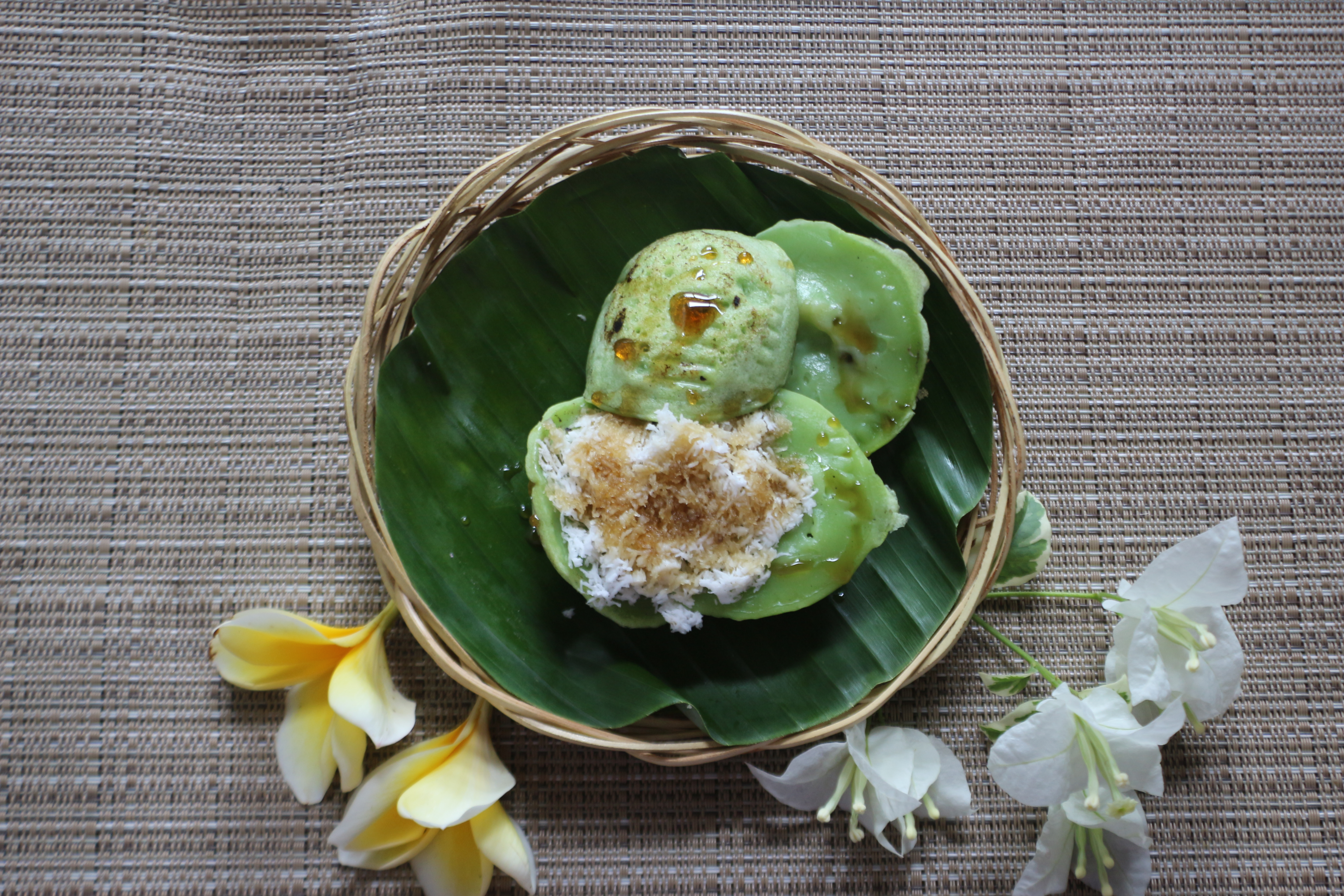
- A plate of laklak, popular in Bali.
- Type: Pancake
- Place of origin: Indonesia
- Region or state: Bali
- Main ingredients: Rice flour, coconut milk, suji leaf extract, baking powder, water, salt, grated coconut, brown sugar

Laklak is a traditional Balinese pancake made from rice flour and coconut milk. It features a small, round shape and has a soft, slightly chewy texture. Traditionally, it is colored green using suji leaf extract and cooked in individual molds. Laklak is commonly served with grated coconut and a sweet syrup made from palm sugar. The dish is a snack in Bali, where it is commonly sold at local markets and by street vendors. It is considered a breakfast food or a light snack. Ingredients typically include rice flour, water, coconut milk, suji leaf extract, baking powder, salt, grated coconut, and brown sugar.

== Etymology ==
Laklak is dervived from two Balinese words, la and lak. La means "careless" and lak means "the future." Together, Laklak serves as a redminder to individuals to not be careless about their future. It can also be referred to Jaja laklak, which belongs to the broader category of Balinese snacks known as jaja, which usually refers to any small, sweet cakes.

== Preparation ==
Preparation of Laklak starts by making the batter with rice and salt in a large bowl. Then gradually pour coconut milk and water while stirring until smooth and lump-free, but one should take care not to overmix the so the cakes remain soft. The palm sugar sauce is created by boiling palm sugar, water, a pandan leaf, and a pinch of salt in a saucepan until thickened. To cook the cakes, heat the laklak mold over a medium heat, lightly grease it, and pour two or three ladles of the batter. Once the edges are cooked and slightly dry, remove the cakes from the mold and drizzle the palm sugar sauce on top. Finally, garnish fresh grated coconut and roasted sesame seeds.

== See also ==
- Apam balik
- Bibingka
- Burgo
- Dadar gulung
- Idli
- Kue
- List of Indonesian dishes
- List of pancakes
- Murtabak
- Pannenkoek
- Poffertjes
- Roti canai
- Roti jala
- Serabi
- Wingko
