= Javanese doughnut =

Indonesian traditional doughnut

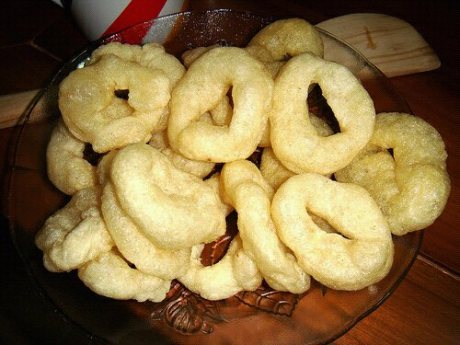
- A plate of javanese doughnut
- Alternative names: Donat jawa, gembus
- Type: Doughnut
- Place of origin: Indonesia
- Region or state: Java
- Created by: Javanese
- Main ingredients: Cassava

The Javanese doughnut, also known in Indonesian as donat jawa (Javanese: donat jawa or gembus), is a traditional doughnut snack, typically savoury, made of cassava instead of potato or flour. This doughnut is quite popular in Javanese cuisine in Java, especially in Central Java, Yogyakarta, and East Java, Indonesia. It is usually served during Javanese occasions, such as wedding parties, wayang shows, ketoprak theater, and Ramadan.

== See also ==
- Cuisine of Indonesia
- Donat kentang
- Javanese cuisine
- Kue
- List of Indonesian dishes
