= Teh poci =

Indonesian preparation of tea

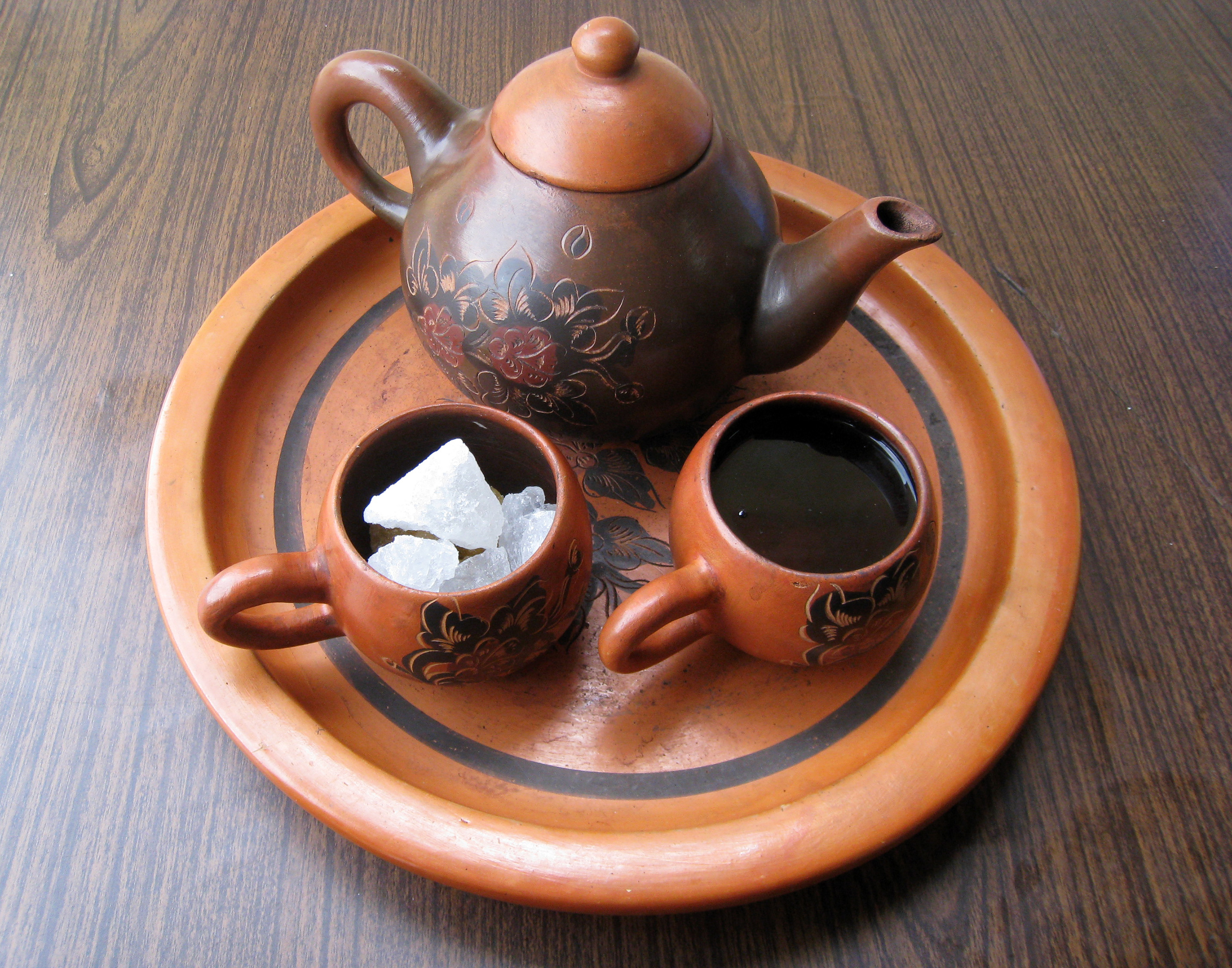
- Teh poci, served in earthenware teapots and cups, along with rock sugar.
- Place of origin: Indonesia
- Region or state: Central Java
- Created by: Javanese people
- Serving temperature: Hot

Teh poci is a tea that is uniquely brewed in a clay teapot and cup. This drink is served with rock sugar and consumed hot. It is a very popular drink among the people of Tegal, Slawi, Pemalang, Brebes, and surrounding areas of Indonesia.

== Etymology ==
There is a term WASGITEL for teh poci, which is an acronym of the Javanese words ''wangi'' (fragrant), ''panas'' (hot), ''sepet'' (astringent), ''legi'' (sweet), and ''kentel'' (thick). This describes the characteristics of *teh poci* as hot tea that is sweet, fragrant with jasmine aroma, and has a dark/thick black color.

Teh poci typically uses green tea or jasmine tea, which releases a distinctive aroma, and is usually served in the morning, afternoon, or evening, accompanied by snacks. The inside of the teapot used for brewing teh poci is usually never washed; instead, only the leftover tea is discarded. The people of Tegal believe that the leftover tea residue will enhance the taste and aroma of the teh poci, making it even more delicious.

== Distribution ==
Outside the Tegal area, teh poci can be found in Warung Tegal, and many sellers of teh poci equipment are already present in the Pantura (North Coast) road area.
