= White carrot =

White carrot may refer to:

- White varieties of the common carrot (Daucus carota subsp. sativus)
- Arracacha, an Andean root vegetable sometimes called white carrot

== See also ==
Other root vegetables are similar in appearance to a white carrot, and may be called "white carrot" in other languages, though not in English:

- Daikon, the large East Asian white radish.
- Parsnip
