= Kopi joss =

Indonesian coffee drink

Kopi jos
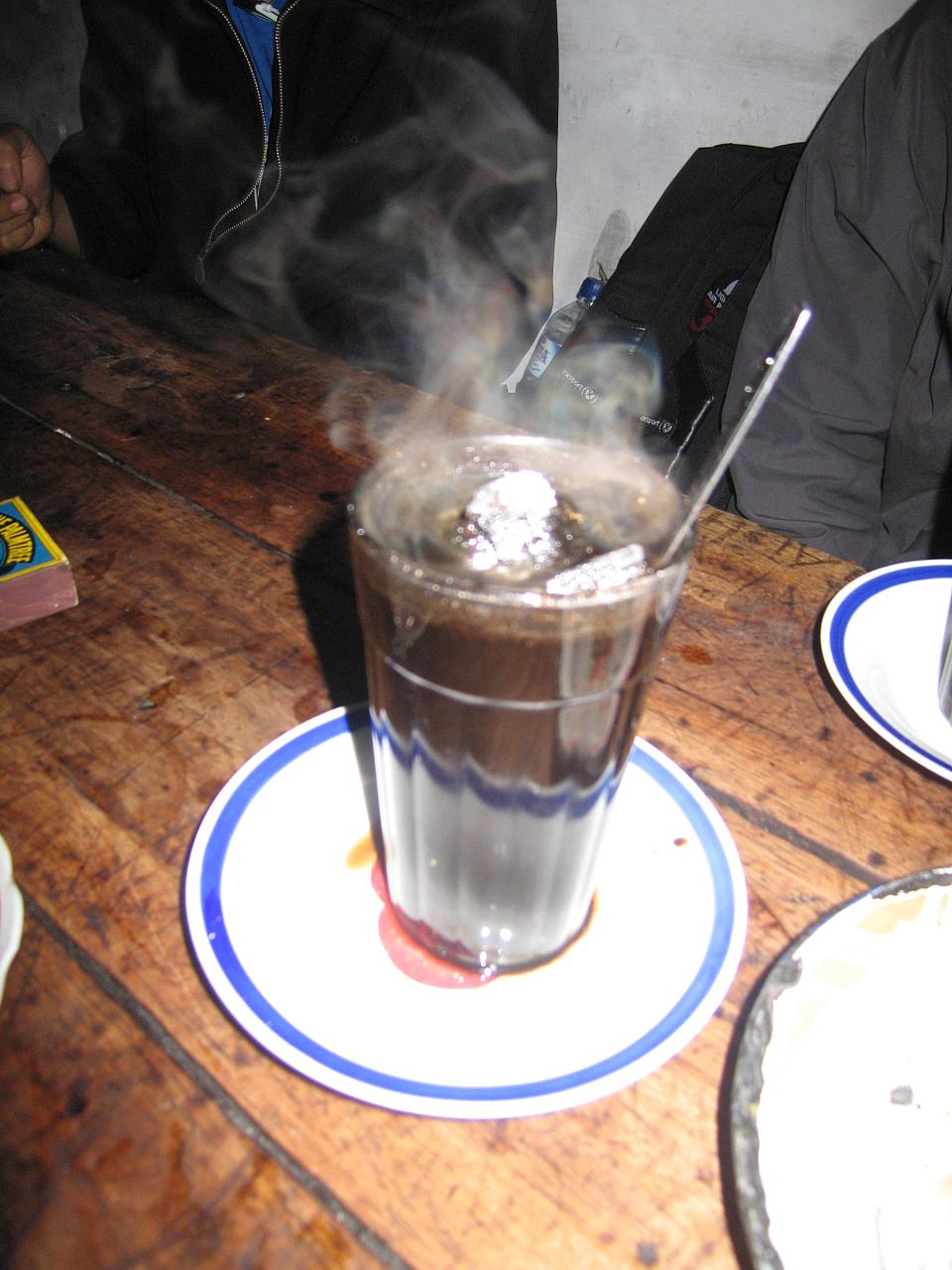
- Served kopi joss on plate
- Type: Coffee beverage
- Origin: Yogyakarta, Indonesia
- Ingredients: Coffee, sugar, charcoal

Kopi joss or kopi jos is a traditional coffee beverage from Yogyakarta served with hot charcoal. The hot charcoal is submerged in brewed black coffee and sugar before serving. This coffee is typically sold at angkringans, a type of street food stall or cart, in Yogyakarta. A cup of kopi joss is usually priced around 5 thousand rupiah.

== History ==
Kopi joss originated at Angkringan Lek Man, which is considered one of Yogyakarta's legendary angkringan. Due to its proximity to Tugu Station, many of Angkringan Lek Man's customers were railway employees. Most of these customers came from East Java and frequently ordered kopi kothok, a common coffee drink in East Java made by boiling coffee, sugar, and water together. However, at that time, Lek Man could not make kopi kothok. As a result, Lek Man took the initiative to drop a burning piece of charcoal into the coffee drink. From then on, many customers enjoyed this charcoal coffee and called it kopi joss. Kopi joss was subsequently widely imitated by other vendors and became one of Yogyakarta's distinctive drinks.
