= Kue bagea =

Indonesian cake

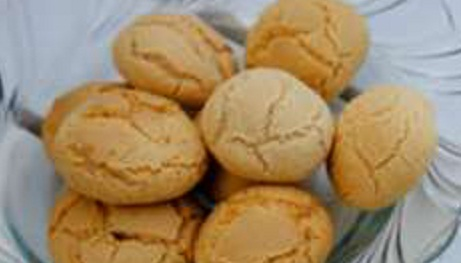
- Kue bagea in a basket
- Type: Cake, pastry, kue
- Course: Snack, dessert
- Place of origin: Indonesia
- Region or state: Eastern Indonesia
- Created by: Moluccans
- Serving temperature: room temperature

Kue bagea (also called sago cake) is a cake originating from Ternate in North Maluku, Indonesia. It has a round shape and creamy color. Bagea has a hard consistency that can be softened in tea or water, to make it easier to chew. It is prepared using sago, a plant-based starch derived from the sago palm or sago cycad.

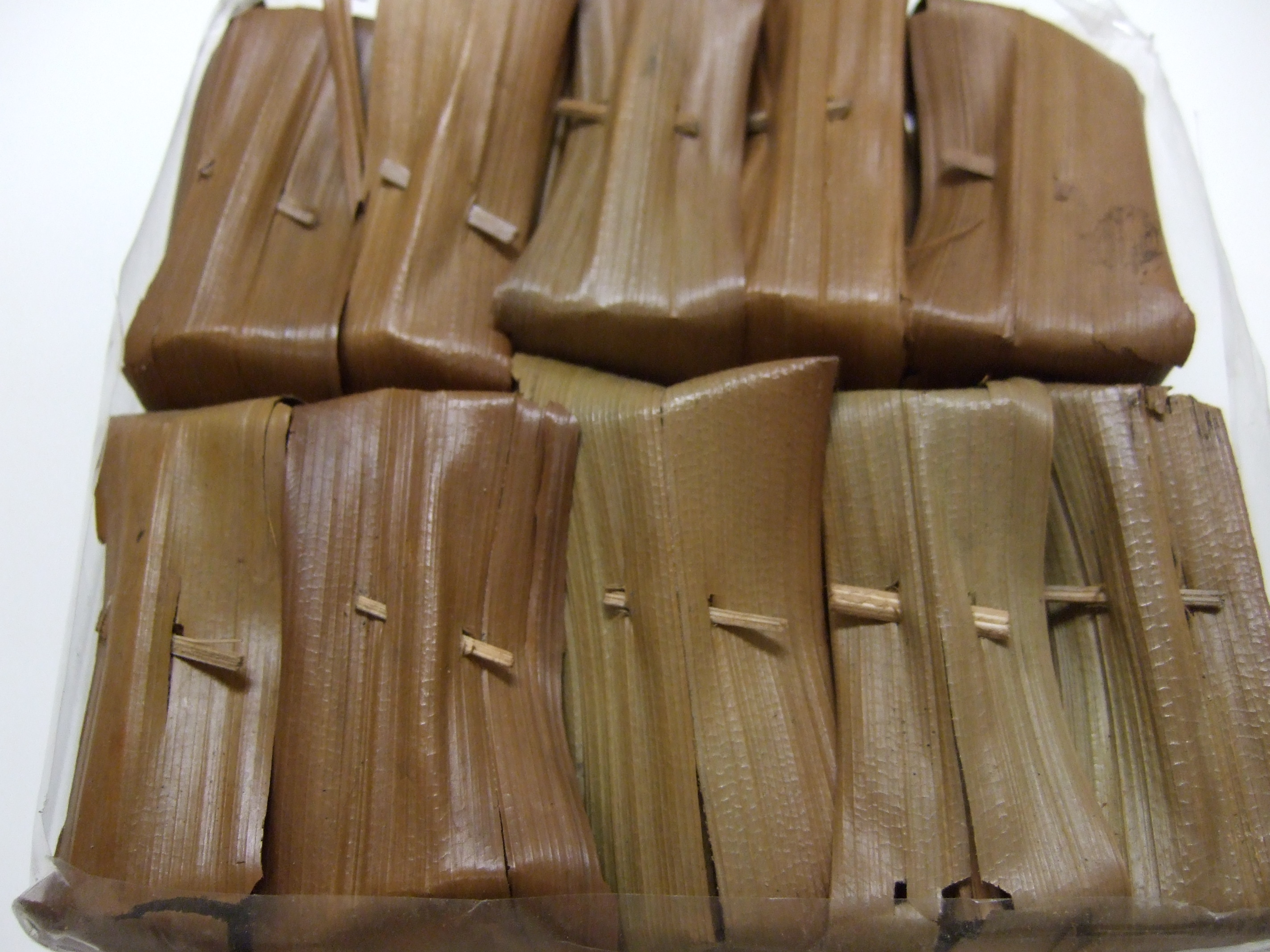
Bagea cakes in wrapping.

== See also ==
- Kue
