= Guazi =

Chinese roasted plant seed snack

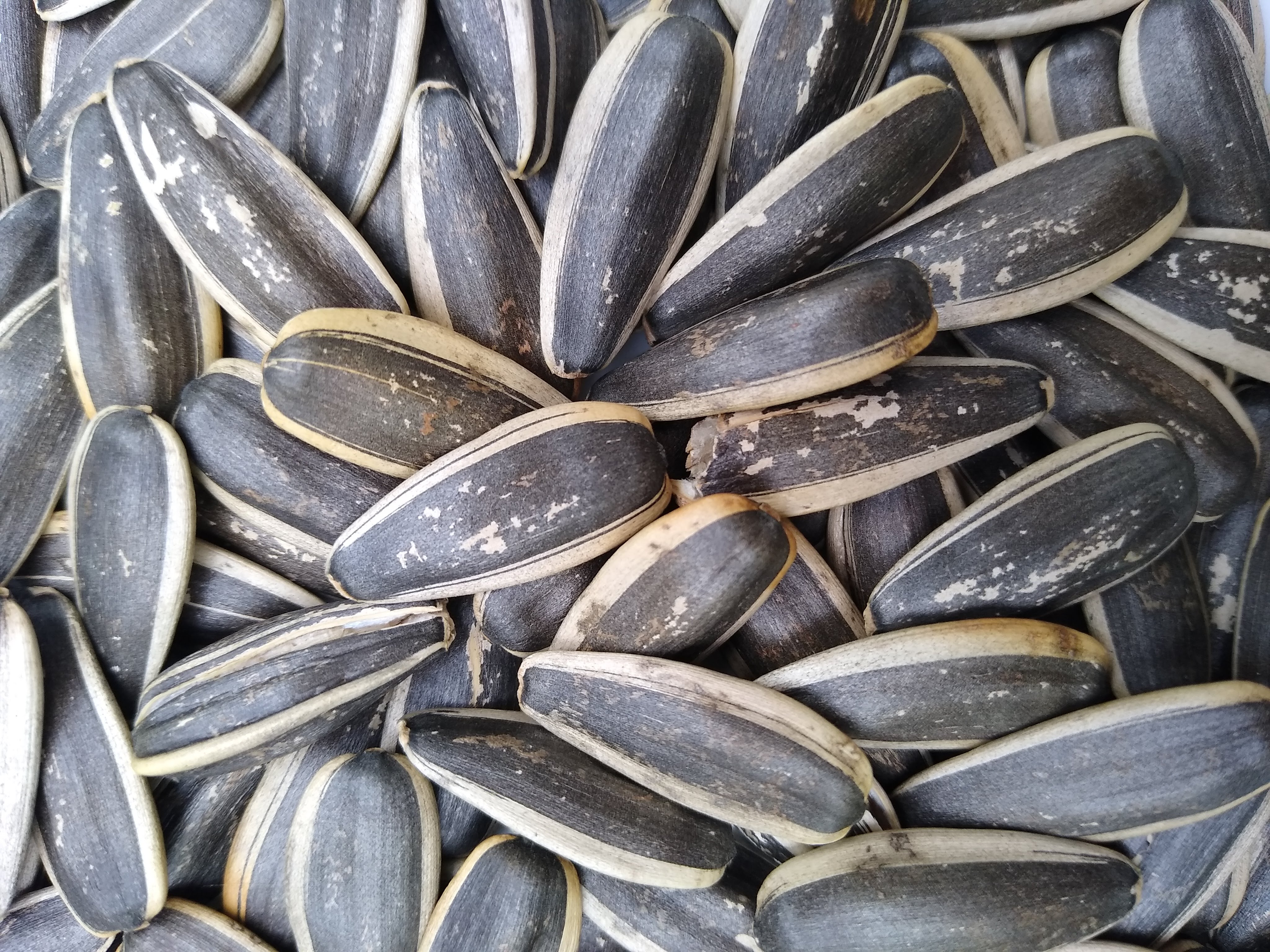
- Guazi or kuaci
- Alternative names: Kuaci (Indonesian)
- Course: Snack
- Region or state: East Asia and Southeast Asia
- Associated cuisine: China, Indonesia, Malaysia and Vietnam

Guazi (Chinese: 瓜子; Indonesian: kuaci), also called kwasi (Burmese: ကွာစေ့) refers to roasted plant seeds. It is a popular snack in China, Malaysia and overseas Chinese communities, especially in Indonesia. While directly translated as "melon seeds" it usually refers to baked seeds of the sunflower, pumpkin, or watermelon seeds. It is often served as an appetizer during banquets.

== History ==
The oldest documentation of the consumption of guazi is recorded in the Taiping Huanyu Ji though it is unclear what specific variety of seed was eaten. Watermelon seeds were the earliest to be consumed in China during the Tang dynasty and only became widespread during the Ming and Qing dynasties.

The Wanli Emperor was described by Liu Ruoyu in the Zhuo Zhong Zhi to have “loved eating fresh watermelon seeds baked with salt.” There is a folk song from the late Ming that described a girl gifting a bag of shelled seeds to her lover. Consumption of pumpkin and sunflower seeds only became commonplace after the Qing. Republican-era artist Feng Zikai observed the popularity of eating seeds during his lifetime in an article on the matter titled "Eating Guazi". Quan Yanchi wrote in his book Leaders Around the Dining Table how Mao Zedong and Liu Shaoqi enjoyed eating guazi.

== Idiom ==
The process of shelling each seed in order to eat the food is time-consuming for a relatively minimal amount of substance. Guazi are often cracked with the teeth, described by the verb kè (Chinese: 嗑; pinyin: kè), which requires some skill. This task can be viewed as wasteful and has been used to symbolize wasting time. It has also been used in context of wasting taxpayer money.

== Varieties ==
- Sunflower seed
- Pumpkin seed
- Watermelon seed

== See also ==
- Chinese cuisine
- Indonesian cuisine
- Malaysian cuisine
- Vietnamese cuisine
