= Butter mochi =

Hawaiian cake

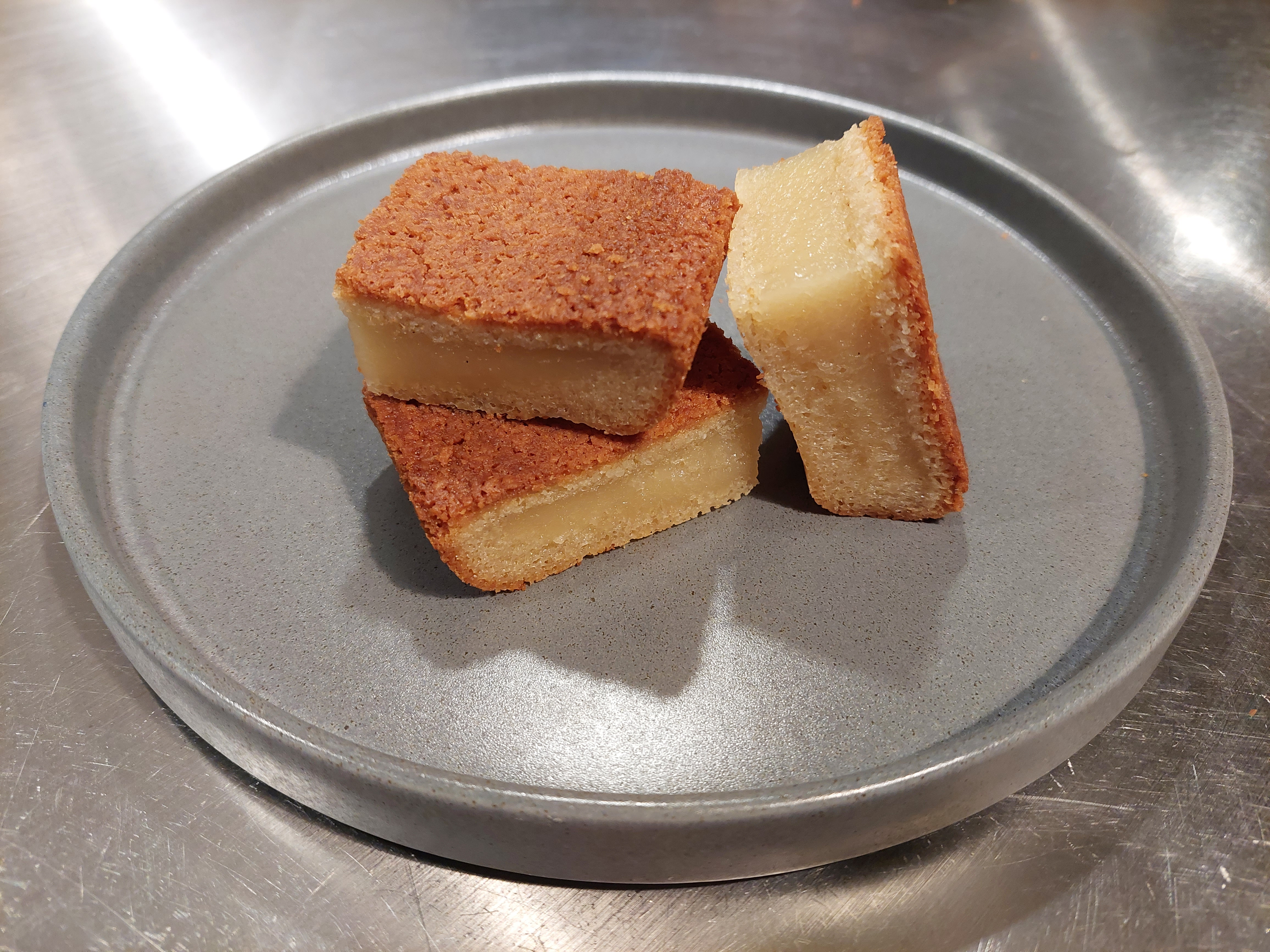
- Type: Confection
- Course: Dessert
- Place of origin: Hawaii
- Associated cuisine: Hawaiian cuisine
- Main ingredients: coconut milk; milk; sugar; butter; eggs; mochiko
- Similar dishes: Bibingka

Butter mochi is a cake made from coconut milk, glutinous rice flour (mochiko), sugar, butter, and eggs. It is a popular dessert in Hawaiian cuisine, where it is more popular than brownies are in the continental US. Having originated in Hawaii, it is an example of Hawaiian local food. It has been described as "a combo of cake and mochi."

== Description ==
Butter mochi combines textures and flavors of its two main influences, mochi and cake. It features a similar chewy ("Q") texture as mochi, but less pronounced through the addition of traditional cake ingredients such as eggs and butter as well as leavening introduced via baking powder.

The specific proportions of butter, sugar, eggs, and milk used in mochi determine the texture, which can approach in extremes that of custard or pound cake. Varying the milk used – fresh, evaporated, coconut, or a combination – changes the flavor, sometimes resulting in nutty or caramel-like flavors.

Unlike other mochi, butter mochi is baked rather than steamed, lending it a color and texture comparable to blondies and chess pie.

== History ==
The exact origins of butter mochi are unknown. According to the New York Times, recipes exist in community cookbooks all around the Hawaiian islands, including in pamphlets which date back "generations" (as of 2021). Rice flour, the main component of the dish, became the main starch of Hawaii due to Japanese immigration, and among other ideas the dish has been proposed to have Japanese origins. However, according to Rachel Laudan, neither the ingredient mixture or the cooking method appears traditionally Japanese. She speculates that it could possibly be an invention of Hawaiian home economists, employed by "the gas or electric companies", prompted by the introduction of ovens.

It is also possible that it is a descendant of bibingka, a similar cake from Filipino cuisine. Traditionally, bibingka was made with wet rice flour, coconut milk, sugar, eggs, and natural yeasts, in a container over the fire with embers on the lid; in modern times baking powder replaces yeast and an oven replaces the container. Some Filipinos in Hawaii use bibingka as a "loose term", occasionally referring to butter mochi.

Recipes in modern Hawaiian cookbooks include influences from various cultures, such as adding sweetened bean paste (Japanese), adding black beans or cheese (Filipino), or adding cocoa powder (a haole addition).

== Gallery ==
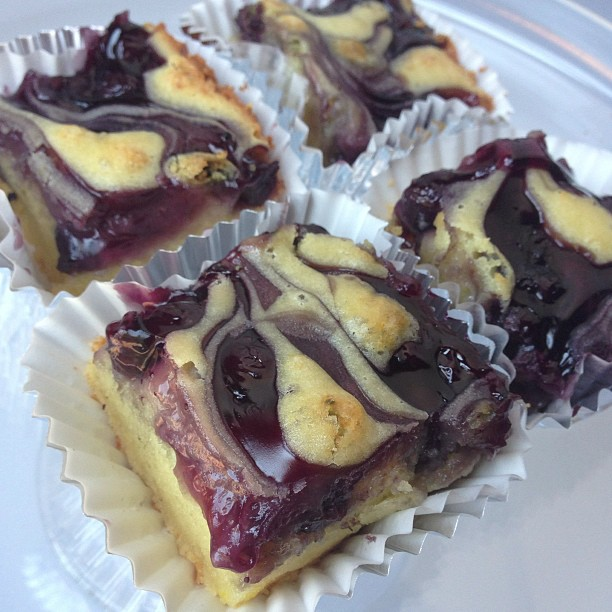
Variant marbled with a blueberry filling

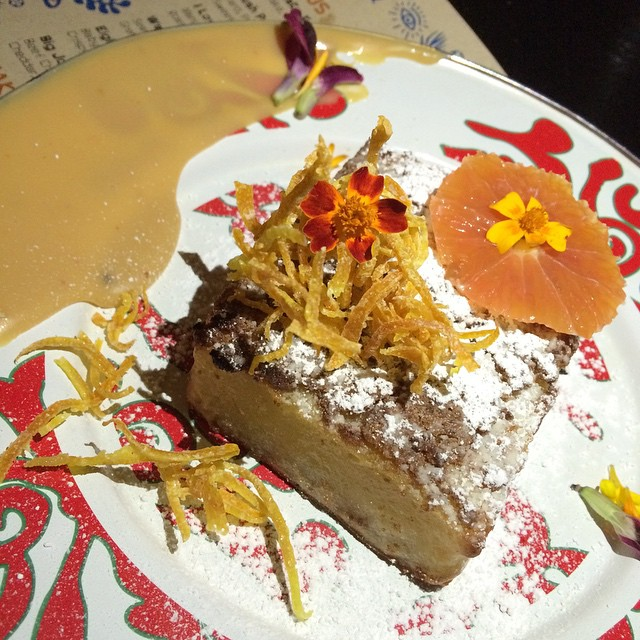
As served with fruit

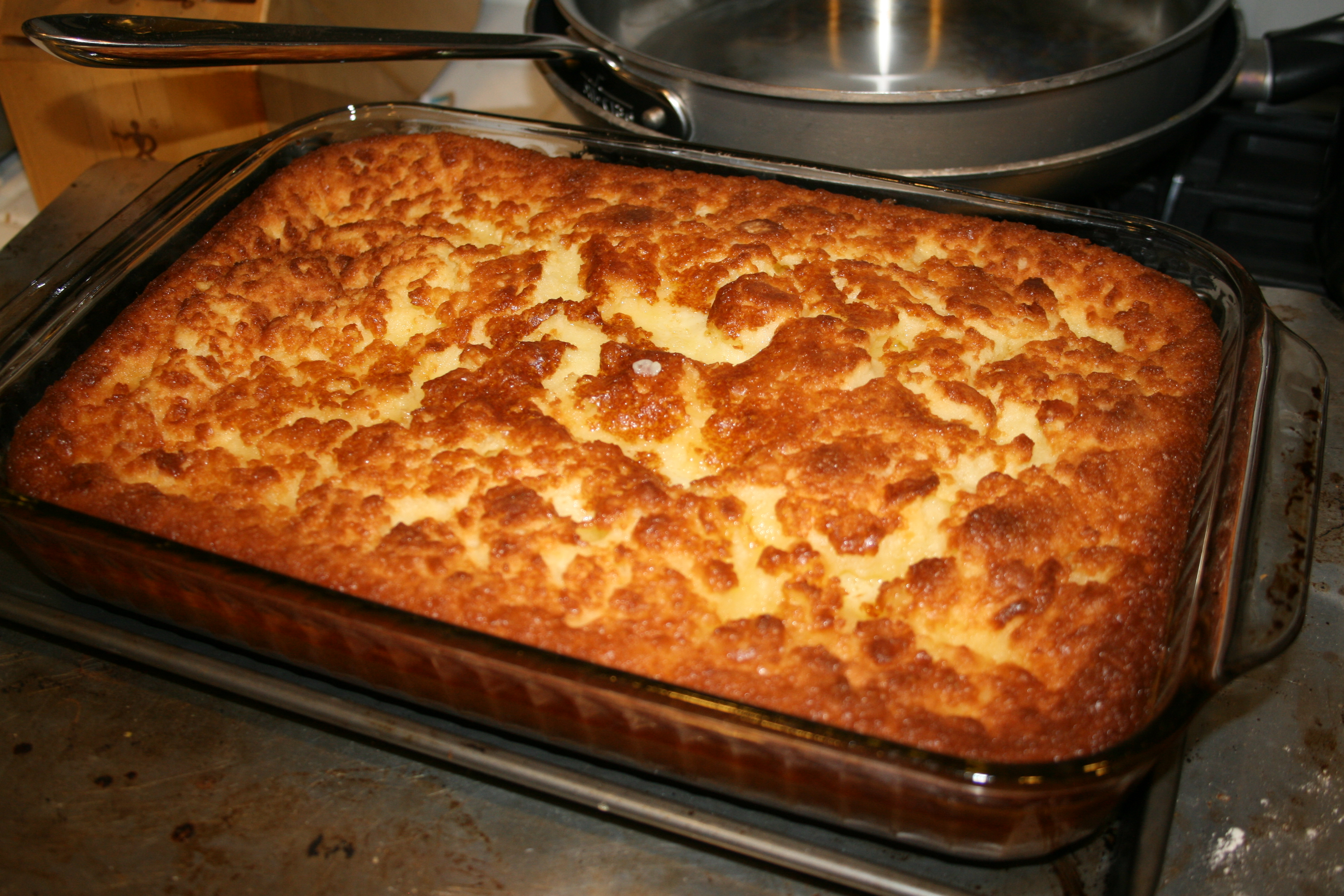
Entire tray after baking

== See also ==
- Bibingka
- Chichi dango, another confection popular in Hawaii based on glutinous rice flour
- Wingko
