= Bika ambon =

Indonesian dessert

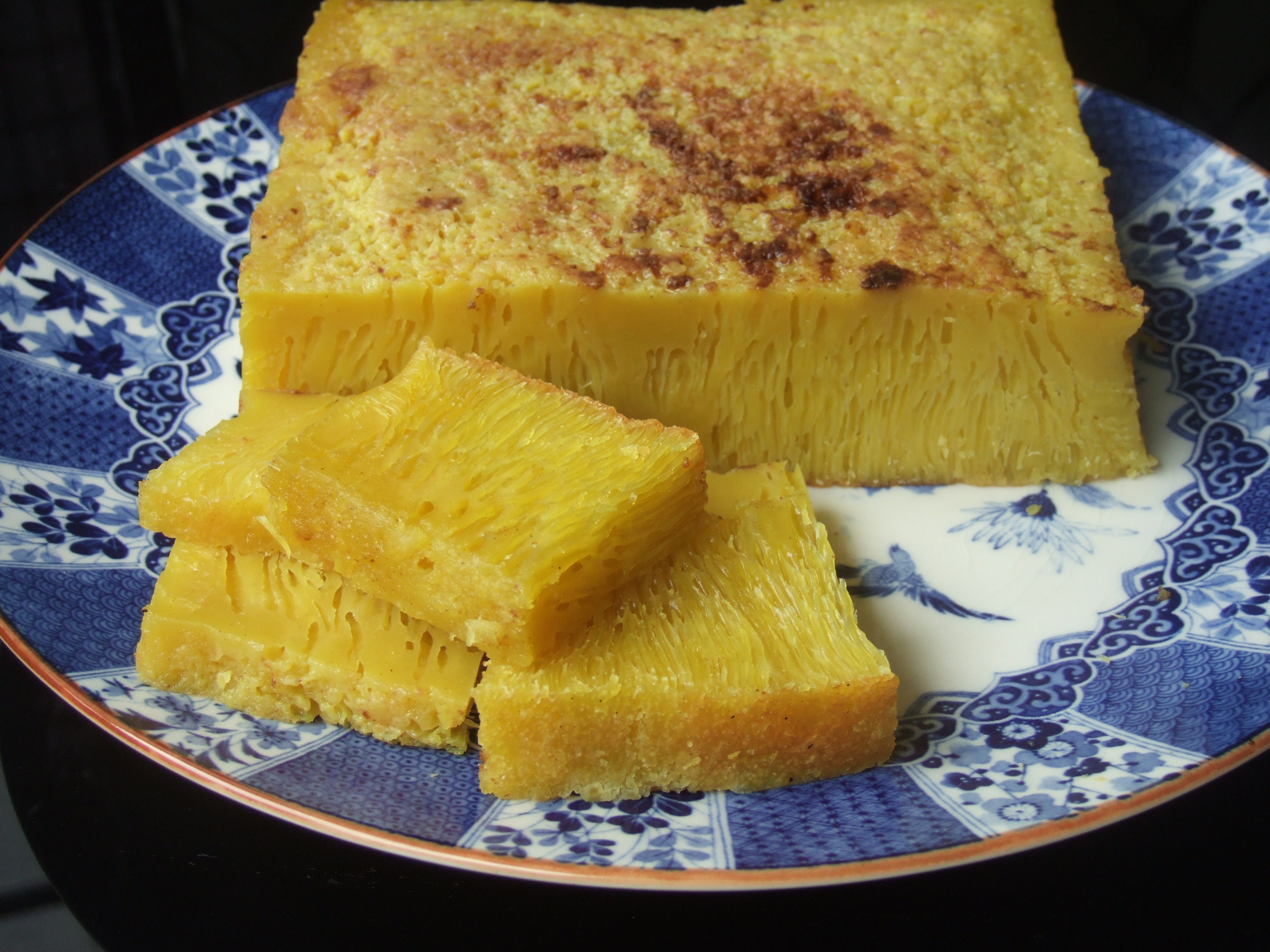
- Type: Cake, kue
- Course: Dessert or snack
- Place of origin: Indonesia
- Region or state: Medan, North Sumatera
- Main ingredients: Tapioca and sago flour, eggs, sugar, coconut milk
- Variations: Kue bingka
- Similar dishes: Bibingka, Malay sponge cake, Bánh bò

Bika ambon or golden cake or golden kuih bingka , is an Indonesian dessert made from ingredients such as tapioca flour, eggs, sugar, yeast and coconut milk. Bika ambon is generally sold in kaffir lime or pandan flavor, but today it is also available in other flavors like banana, durian, cheese and chocolate.

Originating from the city of Medan in North Sumatra, the cake is usually cooked twelve hours. This is thought to ensure that it lasts longer. After four days the cake starts to harden.

This cake is a further development of kue bingka, a famous traditional cake in the eastern parts of Indonesia.

The cake is notable for its sponge-like holes, which are formed by yeast in the cake dough that creates bubbles. These holes give it a unique spongy texture when it is baked. It is a close analogue of the Malay sponge cake, due to similar spongy holes, but the moisture and texture are slightly different.

== Etymology ==
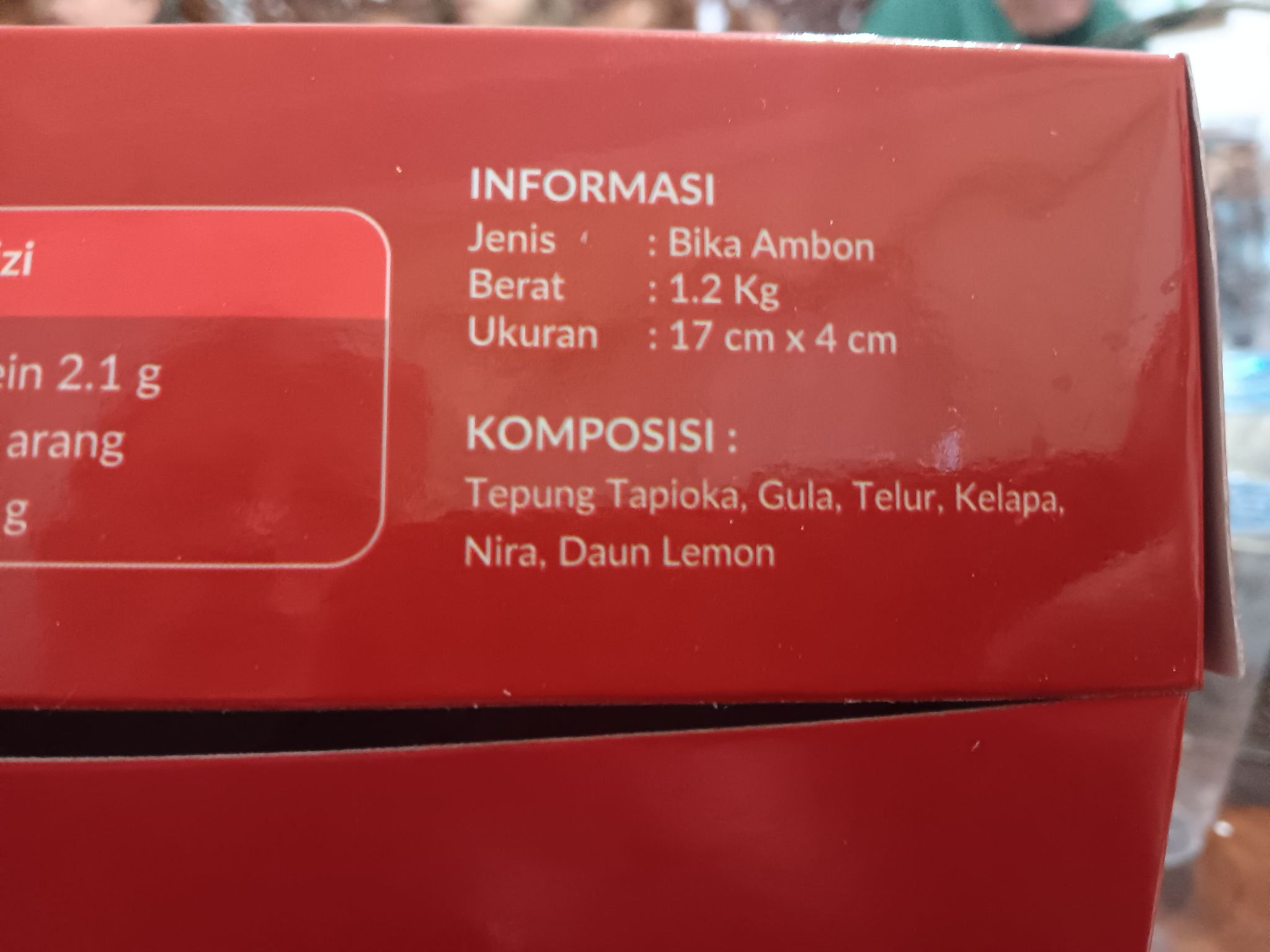
Ingredients as listed on the box of a bika ambon: tapioca flour, sugar, eggs, coconut, nira (aren sap), lime leaves

Although the name contains the word "Ambon", the name of an island and its largest city, Bika ambon is widely known as the specialty cake of Medan in North Sumatra and is often brought as a gift by those who visited the city. The origins of bika ambon are not known; however, there is some speculation that they came to Medan through Ambonese traders, where the locals took a liking to it.

Another popular explanation states that Bika Ambon derives its name from being first sold in Medan in Ambon street. Nowadays, Mojopahit Street, Medan Petisah is the most famous sales region of bika ambon in Medan, North Sumatra. There are at least 40 stores on that street that sell this kind of cake. It is also sold in other locations in Indonesia, including the tax-free areas at many airports.

Recently, bika ambon has become popular around Central Java, thanks to a few retail shops that sell various Indonesian traditional cakes.

== See also ==
- Kue
- White sugar sponge cake
- Bánh bò
