= Seri muka =

Layered-cake

Kuih seri muka سري موک
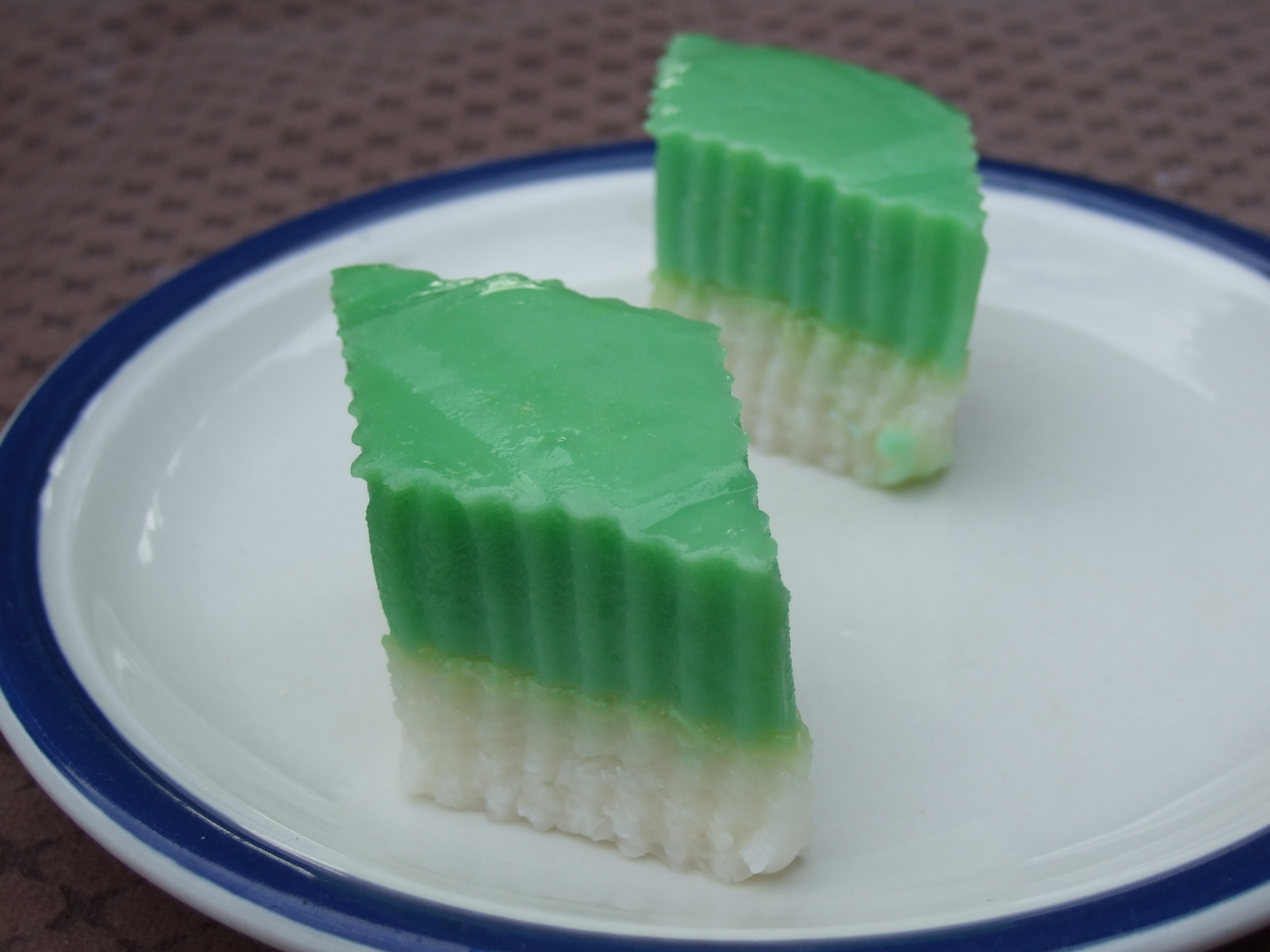
- A plate of kue seri muka
- Alternative names: Kueh sri muka or putri salat
- Type: Cake (layered cake), pudding, kue
- Course: Snack or dessert
- Place of origin: Indonesia and Malaysia
- Region or state: Southeast Asia
- Created by: Banjarese and Malays

Kuih seri muka (Jawi: سري موک), sri muka or putri salat (lit. 'pretty face cake') is a Malay originally from Malaysia and Banjarese two-layered dessert with steamed glutinous rice forming the bottom half and a green custard layer made with pandan juice (hence the green colour). Coconut milk is a key ingredient in making this kue. It is used to impart creamy taste when cooking the glutinous rice and making the custard layer. This kue is found in Indonesia (especially in South Kalimantan), Malaysia and Singapore.

In 2009, the Malaysian Department of National Heritage declared seri muka as one of 100 Malaysian heritage foods and drinks.

== See also ==
- Kue
- List of desserts
- List of Indonesian desserts
- List of steamed foods
- Banjarese cuisine
- Malay cuisine
