= Kue bingka =

Indonesian traditional cake

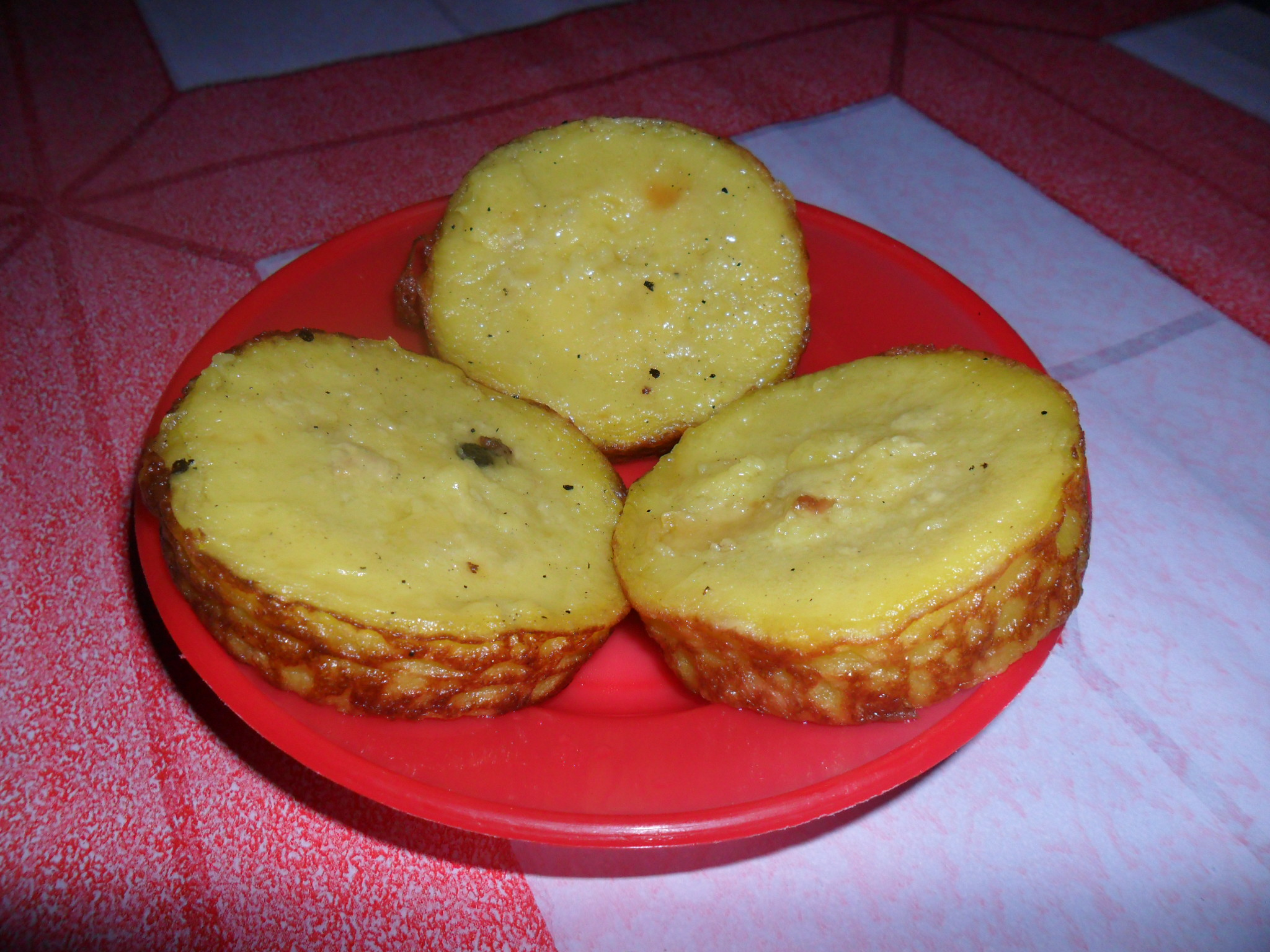
- A plate of kue bingka
- Type: Cake, kue
- Course: Dinner and dessert (on breakfast and iftar)
- Place of origin: Indonesia
- Region or state: South Kalimantan
- Variations: Various
- Similar dishes: Bika ambon, Bibingka, Wingko

Kue bingka is an Indonesian traditional cake (kue basah) that is one of the typical traditional Banjar kue mostly associated with South Kalimantan province, Indonesia. Kue bingka also found in Malay cuisine. It has a sweet taste and a soft texture. Kue bingka is one of the cakes used in the Banjar tradition to serve 41 types of cakes for special occasions such as weddings. Although it can be found throughout the year, kue bingka is usually common in Ramadan due to it is considered suitable for iftar.

Aside from being a typical Banjarese dessert, kue bingka is also famous in neighboring provinces such as East Kalimantan and Central Kalimantan, even to foreign countries such as Brunei, Malaysia and Singapore. Kue bingka was introduced by the Sino-Burmese to Lower Myanmar, where it is known as kway pinka (ကွေပင်ကား).

== Ingredients ==
Kue bingka is made up of flour, eggs, coconut milk, sugar and salt. As a rule, kue bingka is baked with floral prints. There are various kinds of kue bingka such as kue bingka tapai, potato, pumpkin and pandan. In addition, there are other types of kue bingka which are common during Ramadan, namely "kue bingka barandam" which is quite different from the usual kue bingka.

== Similar dishes ==
Kue bingka is almost similar to Filipino, Eastern Indonesian and Timorese bibingka and Javanese wingko.

== See also ==
- Cuisine of Indonesia
- Banjar cuisine
- Bibingka
- Kue
- Wingko
