= Pekasam =

Indonesian and Malaysian fermented dish

Pekasam ڤكاسم
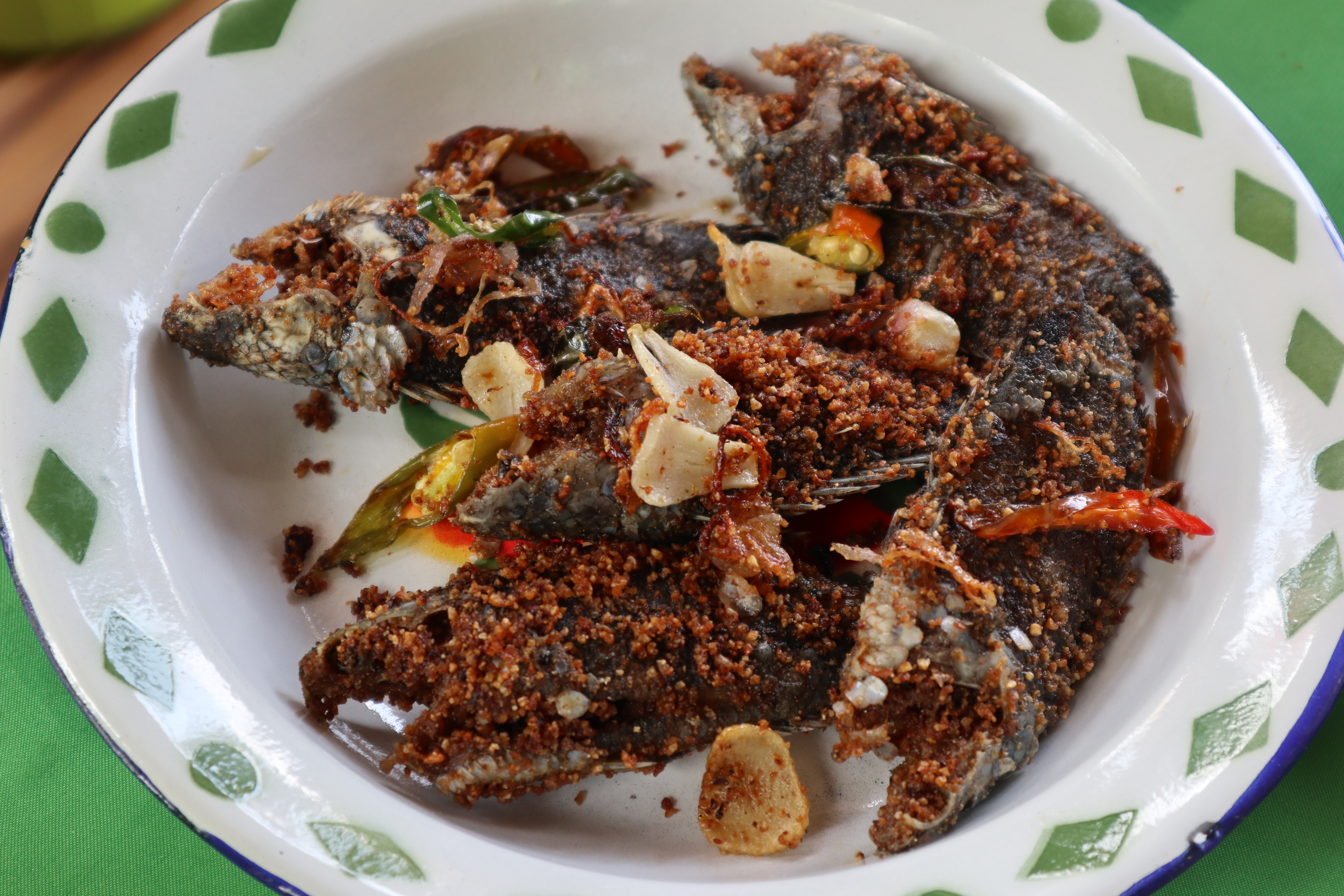
- Iwak pakasam basanga a dish of fried pekasam fish, a Banjar dish of South Kalimantan, Indonesia
- Course: Main course
- Place of origin: Indonesia and Malaysia
- Region or state: Sumatra, Malay Peninsula, Kalimantan
- Created by: Malay and Banjar peoples

Pekasam (Jawi: ڤكاسم), Pakasam or Bekasam is a Malay term for fermented food, more precisely fermented fish product. In Malay and Banjar cookery, pekasam usually refers to freshwater fish fermented with salt, palm sugar, toasted rice grains and pieces of asam gelugur.

== Distribution ==
Pekasam fish fermentation technique is widely distributed in Malay Archipelago; more precisely in Sumatra, Malay Peninsula, and Borneo.

Pekasam or Bekasam is widely distributed in Indonesia, especially in Gayo highlands in Aceh, Riau, South Sumatra, Kapuas Hulu in West Kalimantan, Banjarmasin in South Kalimantan, and Cirebon in West Java.

In Malaysia, the production of pekasam is concentrated at the northern end of the Malaysian peninsula in states such as Perlis, Kedah, Perak, and the Bornean state of Sarawak. In Malaysia, pekasam is the only fermented fish product that uses freshwater fish as the raw material, while in Indonesia, pekasam can be made of both freshwater fish or seafood. Thin beef strips is also used to make pekasam instead of fish in Malaysia. Chicken, mutton and squid eggs are also available as pekasam. Unlike fish pekasam, these variants are frozen after preparation and can last up to six months.

== Etymology ==
In Malay language, the term asam means "sour", which suggests the fermentation process that produces sour flavour. Pekasam tastes sour and mostly contain lactic acid bacteria. In most parts of Indonesia and Malaysia, pekasam refer to fermented fish. However in Aceh, northern tip of Sumatra, pekasam refer to fermented durian or tempoyak.

== As a preservation method ==
In Indonesia, pekasam as fish preservation method is quite widely distributed, especially in Sumatra, Kalimantan (Indonesian Borneo), and some parts of Java. The process of making fish pekasam or pickled fish takes more than a month. Initially, the fish meat used for the fish stock was preserved in the terracotta jar, mixed with salt, sugar and rice. The type of fish used in Cirebon pekasam is sailfish. In Cirebon, West Java, Pekasam or Bekasem is a special food prepared and consumed for Mawlid.

== As a dish ==
In Indonesia, making pekasam is a tradition in Banjarese of South Kalimantan. The term pekasam often added to a dish that uses pekasam fish as its main ingredients; such iwak pakasam basanga; a dish of fried pekasam fish, a Banjar dish of South Kalimantan.

In Malaysia pekasam is usually consumed deep-fried or prepared as a side dish that goes well with rice.

== See also ==
- Pindang
- Cincalok
- Narezushi
