= Salukara =

Pancake from Filipino cuisine

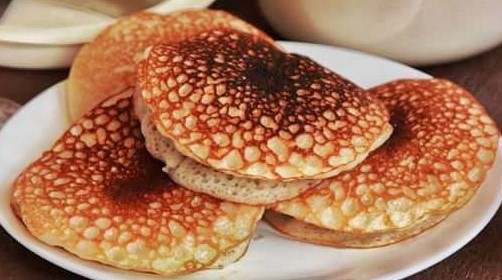
- Alternative names: Salokara, salucara, salocara
- Course: Dessert, breakfast
- Place of origin: The Philippines
- Region or state: Eastern Samar
- Serving temperature: Hot or warm
- Main ingredients: Rice flour, water or coconut milk, sugar, tubâ wine/yeast
- Variations: see Bibingka

Salukara is a type of pancake made by the Waray people in Eastern Samar, Philippines. Its ingredients are galapong (or glutinous rice flour), coconut milk, sugar, and water, the same as a cake called bibingka. Traditionally tubâ (palm wine) is used as the leavening agent, giving the pancakes a slightly sour aftertaste, though standard baker's yeast can be substituted. They are cooked in a pan or clay pot traditionally greased with pork lard or lined with banana leaves. They are commonly eaten for breakfast and for merienda.

== Description ==
Salukara is a Filipino pancake made with galapong, or ground rice flour. Simple yeast is used as a raising agent, while some use tuba, or palm wine. Rice is used to make it, with native rice being used. It is cooked in pans with pork lard. It is then contained in banana leaves. It tastes like bibingka, with a hint of puto. It has been compared to American pancakes.

== History ==
Salukara was already a delicacy from the Spanish tenure, with ingredients unchanged. Salukara was enjoyed by Ben Evardone, Eastern Samar's governor, House Representative Maria Fe and Actor Boy Abunda also enjoyed this dish. It appeared in television shows and festivals. Salukara is regularly sold near populated places. In July 2019, it was one of the entries in the Can-avid town festival. In December 2022, it was one of the entries in the Arteche town festival.

== See also ==
- Daral
- Kakanin
- Morón
- Puto
- Serabi

== Bibliography ==
- Alegre, Edilberto N. (1994). Pinoy Na Pinoy!: Essays on National Culture. Anvil. ISBN 978-971-27-0399-7.
- Tomás: The Literary Journal of the UST Center for Creative Writing and Studies. The Center. 2003.
