= Banjar cuisine =

Cuisine of the people of Banjar

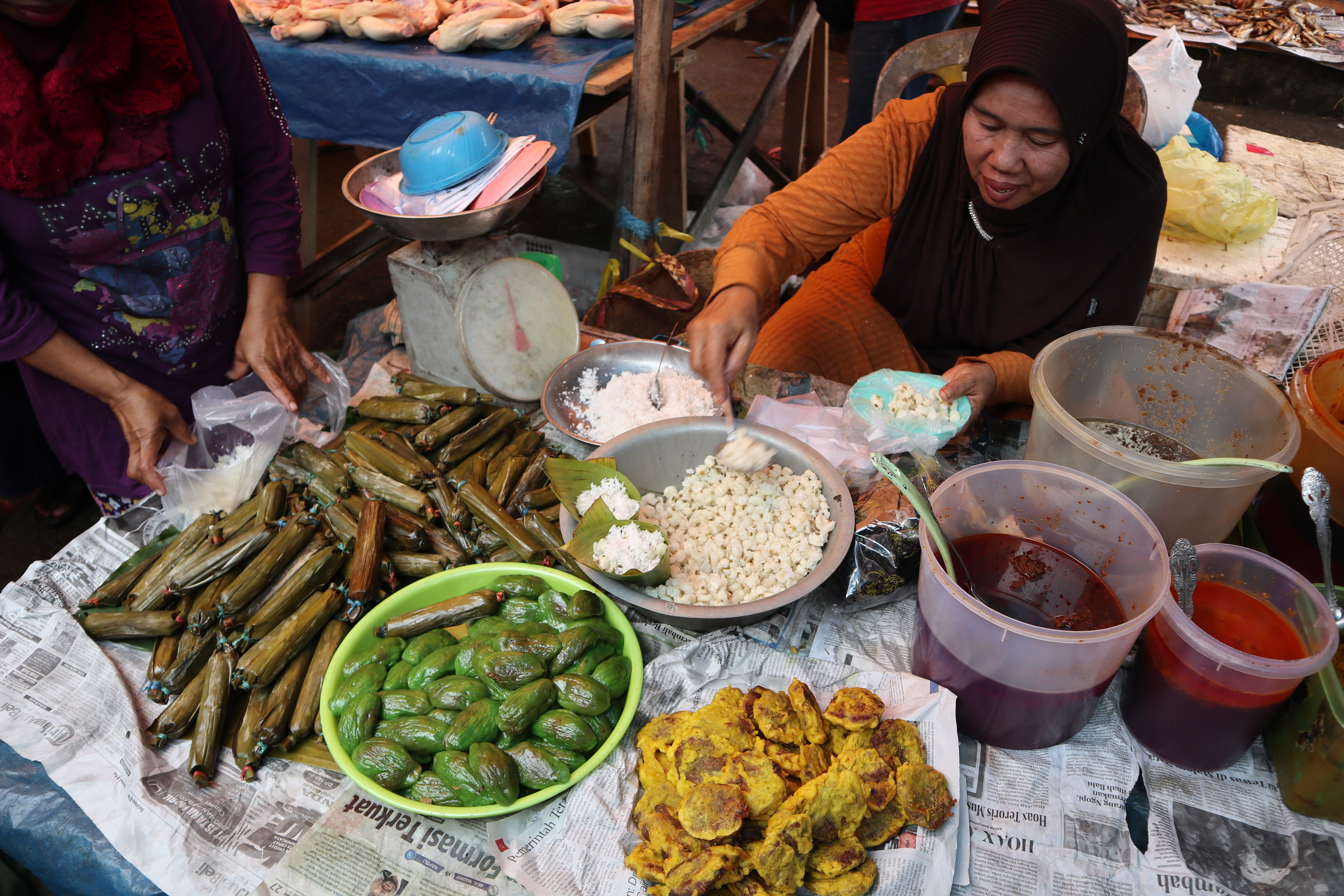
Banjarese traditional snacks being sold in a traditional market.

Banjarese cuisine is the cooking tradition and cuisine of Banjar people of South Kalimantan in Indonesia. Banjar cuisine is also found in neighbouring countries such as Brunei, Malaysia, and Singapore.

Banjar cuisine has been influenced by many cultures, includes Malay, Javanese, Chinese and Indian cuisine.

One of the famous culinary of Banjar cuisine is soto banjar . Soto banjar has become one of Indonesia's special foods that are already very well known and recognised by many people. Soto banjar is served in many restaurants throughout the province. Soto banjar is a soto made from chicken meat as its main ingredient, then added with various spices such as onion, white onion, cumin, fennel, and cinnamon to make the soto more savoury. Additional juice from lime makes this dish even more fresh. This dish is usually served during lunchtime.

Banjar cuisine generally includes soupy foods like sop ayam banjar. Unlike soto banjar, which uses ketupat, the chicken soup is served with steamed rice. The broth is made with spices like clove, star anise, nutmeg and ginger. Companions to this dish can include rice vermicelli, a sprinkle of fried shallots, a spring onion, and lime juice.

Ketupat Kandangan Banjar is a speciality of South Kalimantan which is usually associated with the Muslim holy day of Eid al-Fitr. It originated from Kandangan, South Hulu Sungai Regency. The food can usually be found around the Muslim holy month of Ramadan. What distinguishes this dish from the usual ketupat is that ketupat kandangan banjar use the tuna as its main ingredient. Sometime it would also use a baked cork fish and cooked with yellow coconut milk sauce. The spices used are from cinnamon, cloves, and cardamom. It tastes savoury and is suitable for eating during the day or breakfast.

Kue bingka is a cake (kue) that unique to the Banjarese. It feels very sweet, fat, and soft. Bingka is one of the cakes used in the Banjar tradition to serve 41 types of cakes for special occasions such as weddings. Although it can be found throughout the year, bingka is usually common in Ramadan because it is considered suitable for breaking the fast. Bingka is made of flour, eggs, coconut milk, sugar and salt. As a rule, bingka is baked with floral prints. There are various kinds of bingka such as bingka tapai, bingka kentang, bingka labu, bingka pandan and so forth. In addition, there are other types of bingka which are common during Ramadan, namely bingka barandam which is actually quite different from the usual bingka. Aside from being a typical Banjarese dessert, bingka is also famous in neighbouring provinces such as East Kalimantan and Central Kalimantan, even to foreign countries such as Malaysia and Brunei Darussalam.

Banjarese cuisine

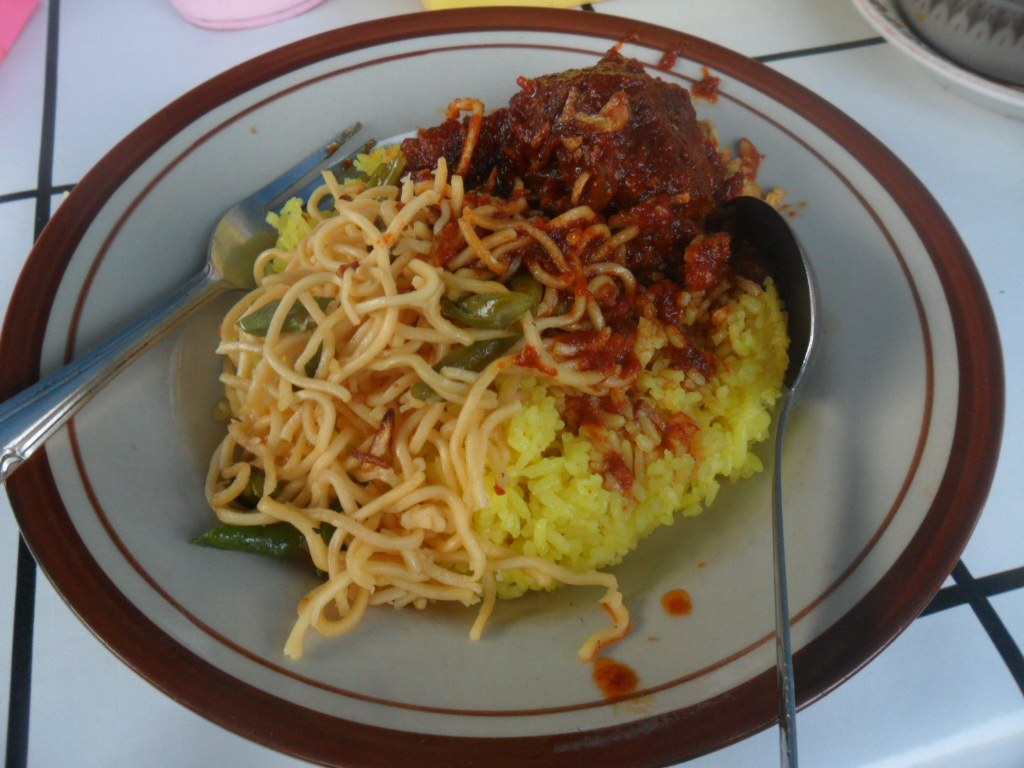
Banjar-style nasi kuning.

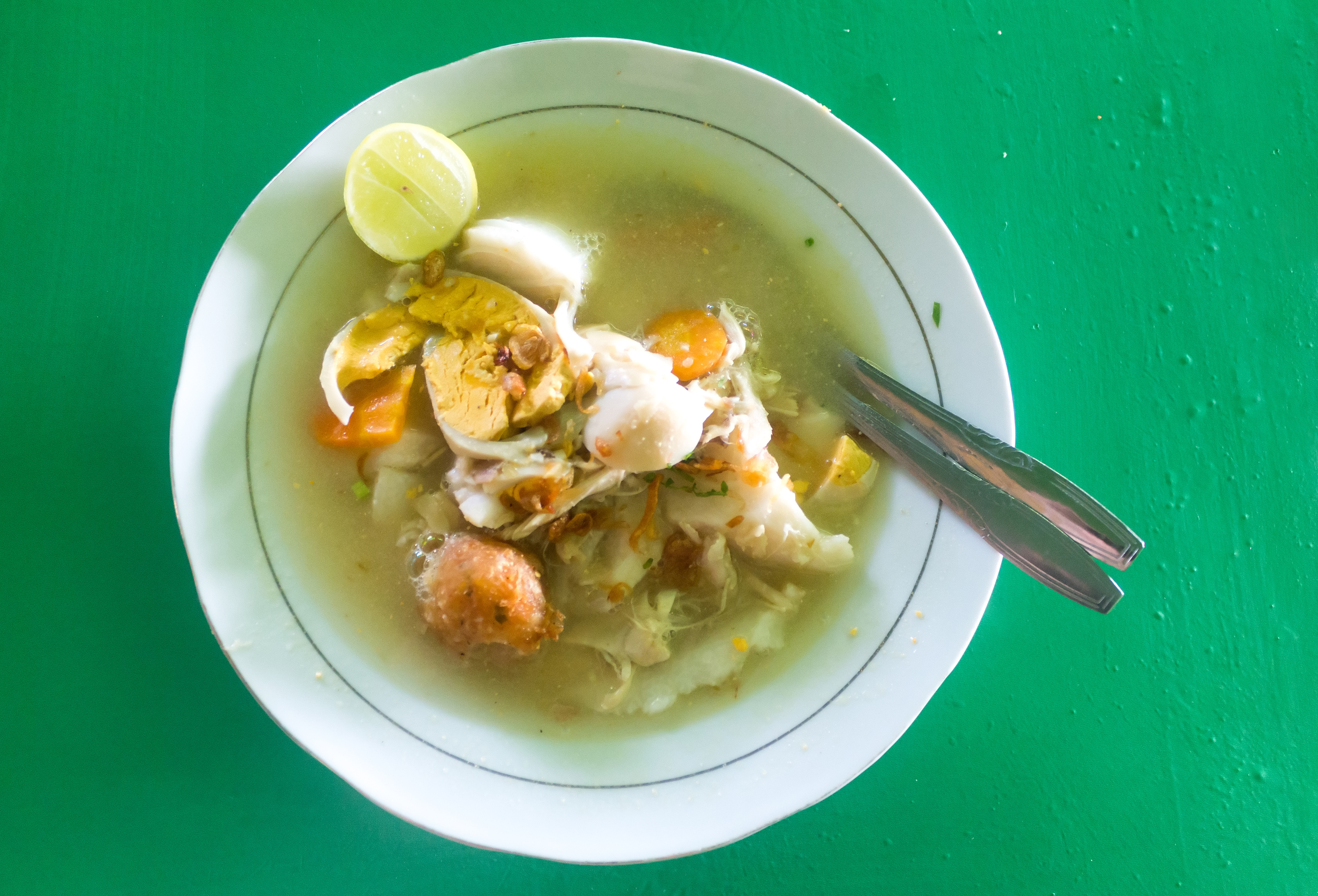
Soto banjar, one of the most well-known Banjar dishes.

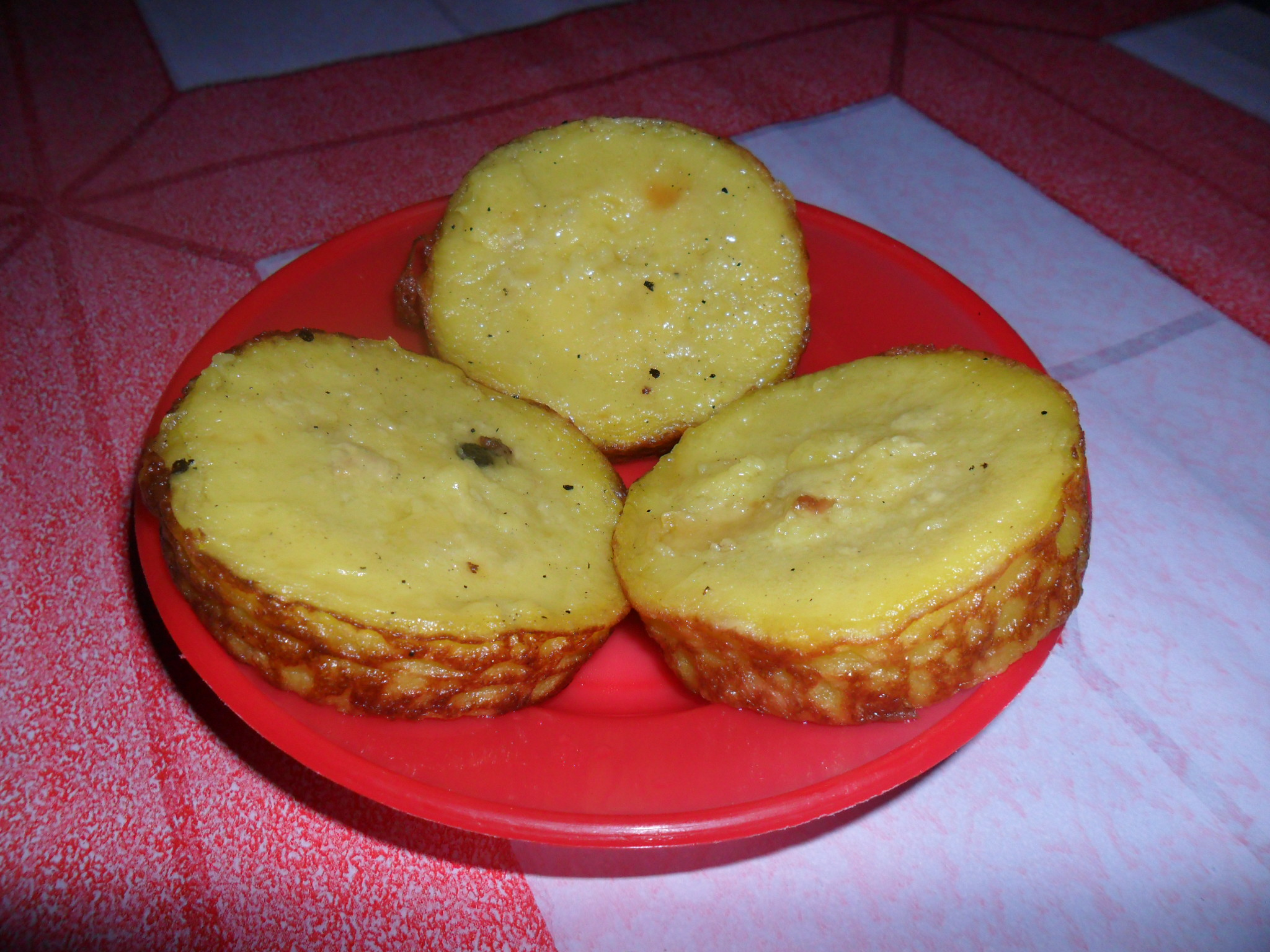
Bingka, a traditional Banjar dessert.

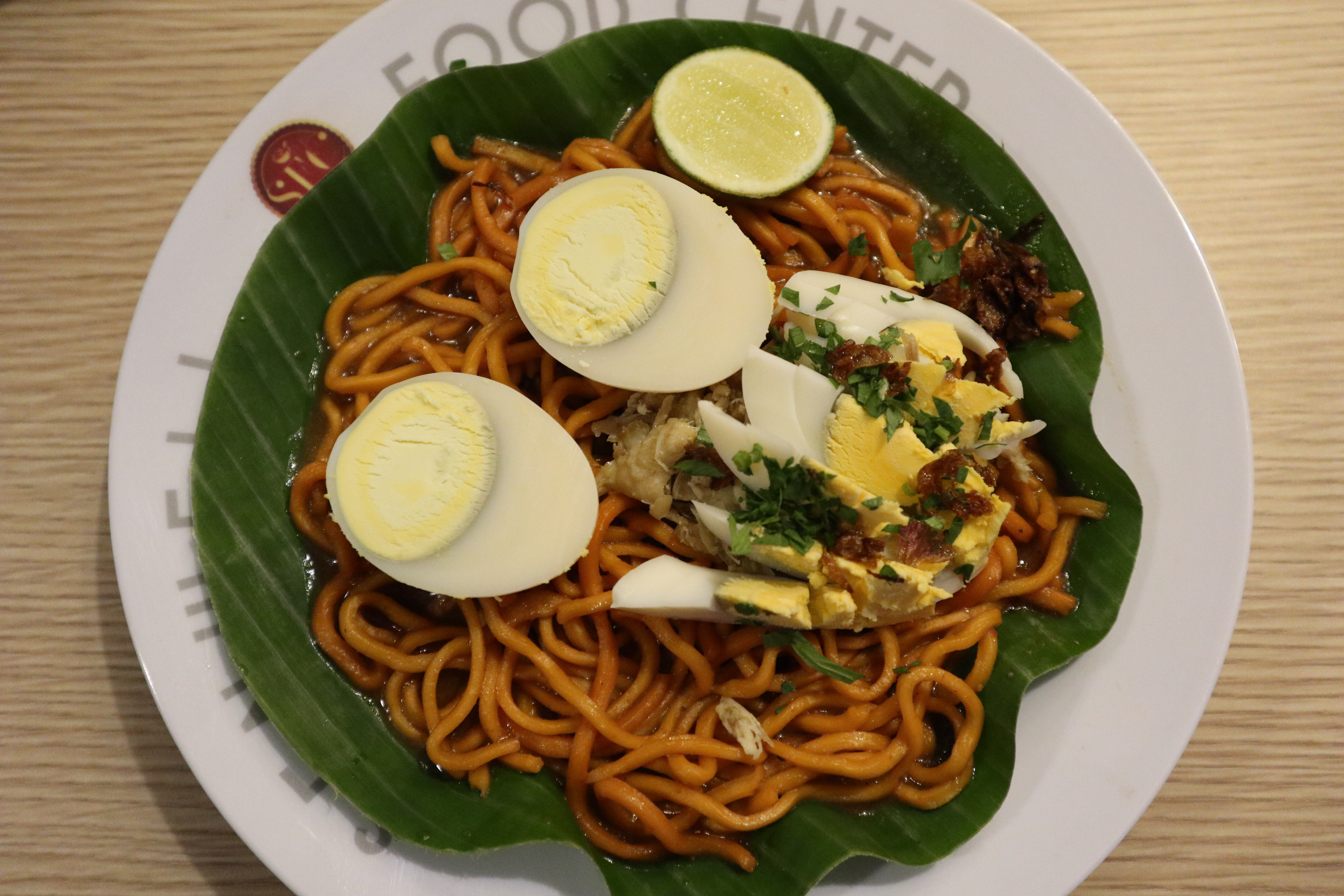
Mie bancir

== List of Banjarese dishes ==
- Apam Barabai, a snack made from rice flour, cassava tape, brown sugar, and white sugar.
- Amparan tatak, a banana rice cake.
- Babungku, a rice-flour based snack made with coconut milk and palm sugar.
- Bingka, very sweet, fat, and soft cake (kue) made of flour, eggs, coconut milk, sugar and salt. It is usually served during Ramadan.
- Gangan humbut, a coconut milk soup made with the heart of palm.
- Ikan haruan bakar, grilled striped snakehead fish.
- Ketupat, rice dumpling made from rice packed inside a diamond-shaped container of woven palm leaf pouch, Bajar styled Ketupat's tend to be longer with a sharper edge in it and is usually eaten with a grilled ikan gabus.
- Ketupat kandangan, ketupat served with tuna or baked snakehead fish and cooked in yellow coconut milk sauce.
- Lempeng, a stuffed banana cake.
- Lontong banjar, Banjar-styled lontong served with boiled eggs, chicken cooked in habang spices or grilled snakehead fish and served with yellow coconut milk sauce.
- Lontong orari, triangle-shaped lontong popular in the city of Banjarmasin.
- Mi bancir, noodles with chicken and boiled duck egg.
- Nasi kuning, fragrant yellow rice dish cooked with coconut milk and turmeric. Bajar styled nasi kuning is usually served with sambal habang and grilled snakehead or chicken, typically topped with serundeng.
- Nasi Sop ayam, Banjar-styled chicken soup consists of steamed rice and broth. The broth is made with spices like clove, star anise, nutmeg and ginger.
- Pekasam, fermented food of freshwater fish fermented with salt, palm sugar, toasted rice grains and pieces of asam gelugur.
- Pais, a rice flour snack made with coconut milk and wrapped in banana leaf.
- Petah, savoury rice flour based snack, usually eaten with a thick coconut milk-based sauce.
- Petah Arab, a variant of the original petah made using regular flour instead of rice flour, usually served with a goat curry. Popular among Arab descendants in Banjarmasin.
- Pupudak baras, a cylinder shaped snake.
- Pundut Nasi , rice dumpling made from steamed rice, coconut milk, and local variant of sambal known as sambal habang wrapped in banana leaves.
- Sari pangantin, a Bajar styled Kue lapis.
- Soto banjar, soto spiced with star anise, clove, lemongrass and sour hot sambal.

== See also ==
- Cuisine of Indonesia
- Javanese cuisine
- Malay cuisine
