= Wingko =

Indonesian traditional pancake dish

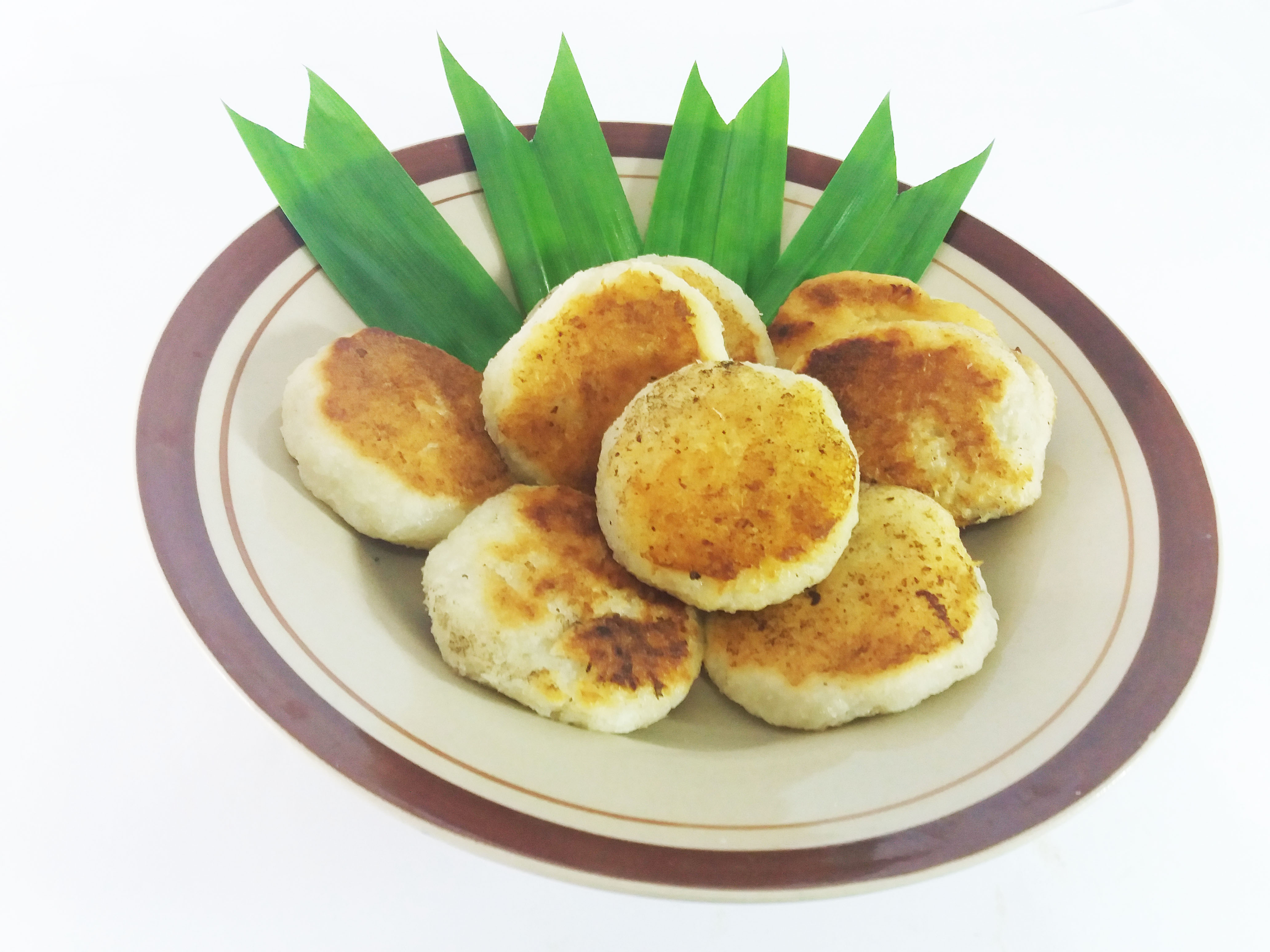
- A plate of wingko
- Alternative names: Wingko babat
- Type: Pancake
- Place of origin: Indonesia
- Region or state: Java and nationwide in Indonesia; also popular in Southeast Asia
- Main ingredients: Coconut

Wingko babat
Nutritional value per 100 g (3.5 oz)
- Energy: 1,485.3 kJ (355.0 kcal)
- Carbohydrates: 51.4 g
- Dietary fibre: 2.4 g
- Fat: 15.1 g
- Protein: 3.2 g
Vitamins and minerals
Vitamins	Quantity %DV^{†}
Thiamine (B1)	7% 0.08 mg
Riboflavin (B2)	6% 0.08 mg
Minerals	Quantity %DV^{†}
Calcium	4% 47 mg
Iron	6% 1.1 mg
Phosphorus	5% 63 mg
- Other constituents: Quantity
- Water: 29.7 g
- ^{†}Percentages estimated using US recommendations for adults. Source: Indonesian Ministry of Health AP113

Wingko, wiwingka, Masirat or bibika, which is sometimes called wingko babat, is a traditional Indonesian pancake-like snack made from coconuts. This kue is usually associated with Javanese cuisine.

Wingko is a type of cake made mainly of coconut and other ingredients. Wingko is especially popular along the north coast of Java. It is mostly sold by peddlers on trains, at bus and train stations, or in the producers' own shops.

Wingko is typically a round, almost hard coconut cake that is served in warm, small pieces. Wingko is sold either in the form of a large, plate-sized cake or small, paper-wrapped cakes.

The best-known wingko is made in Babat. As its full name, wingko babat, suggests, wingko actually originated in Babat, a small district in Lamongan regency in East Java, near the border with the regency of Bojonegoro. In Babat, a small town in Bojonegoro, wingko plays a significant role in the local economy. There are many wingko factories in that city, employing many workers. The factories receive coconut fruit from the neighbouring municipalities.

Today, various brands and sizes of wingko are for sale. Most wingko factories are still owned by Indonesian Chinese, and some still use Chinese-language names for their brands.

== See also ==
- Bibingka - a similar rice cake from the Philippines and eastern Indonesia
- Kue bingka - a similar cake from the Banjar and Malay people of Indonesia
- Butter mochi
