= Pundut Nasi =

Banjarese rice dish

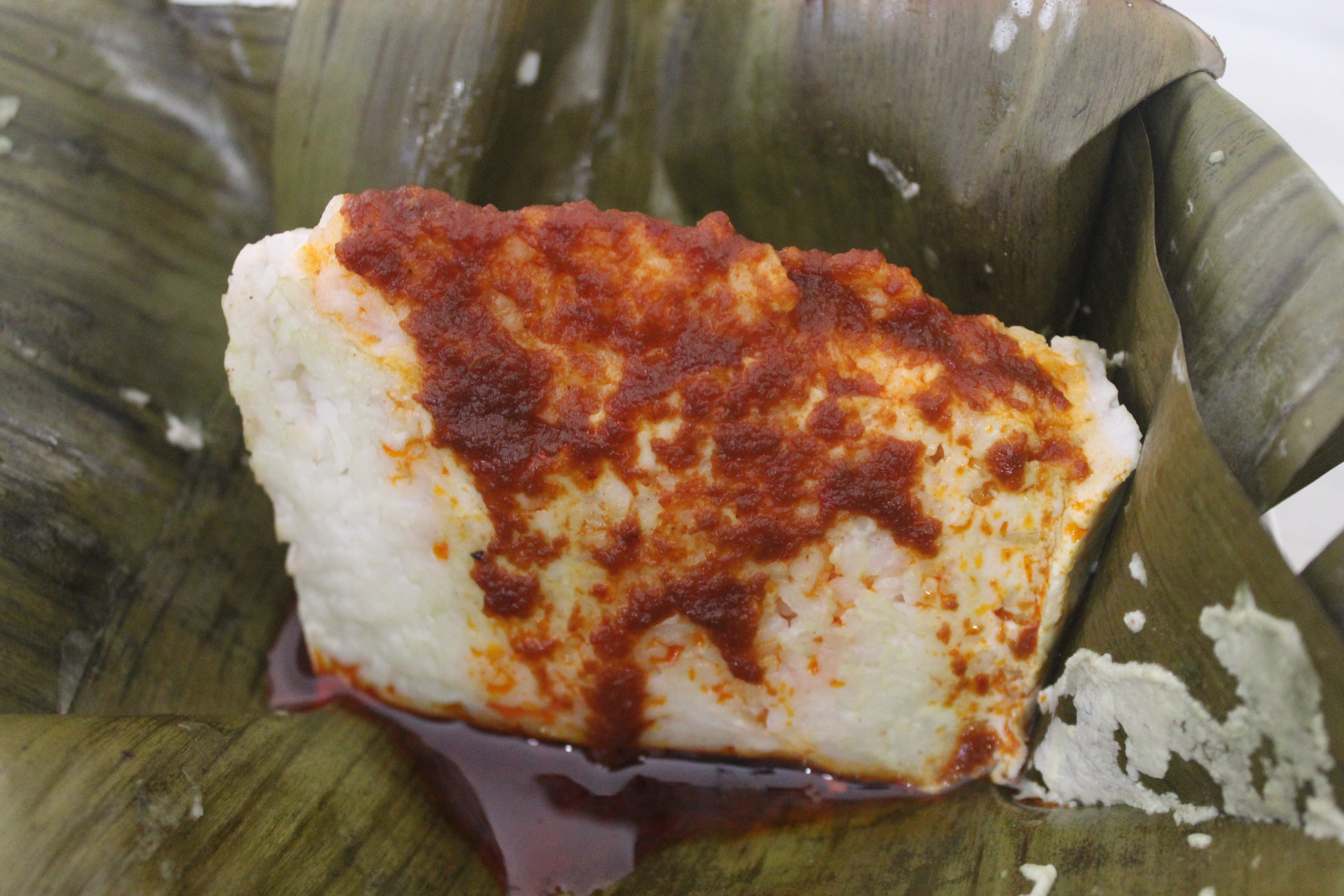
- Course: Snack
- Place of origin: Indonesia
- Region or state: Banjarmasin
- Main ingredients: Rice, grated coconut, brown sugar, coconut milk, banana leaf

Pundut Nasi (English: wrapped rice) is a traditional Banjarese food from South Kalimantan, Indonesia. It is made from steamed rice, coconut milk, and sambal habang wrapped in banana leaves.

Pundut Nasi has a savory flavor derived from the coconut milk fat and is steamed while wrapped in banana leaf. It is often consumed with side dishes such as duck eggs, snakehead fish, or papuyu fish, served with a drizzle of lapat sauce and sambal habang (red chili paste).

Pundut Nasi can be found in traditional markets or Indonesian food stalls. It is also found in the Kutai area and served at traditional events such as Beseprah (a communal dining tradition).
