= Bibingka =

Filipino baked rice cake

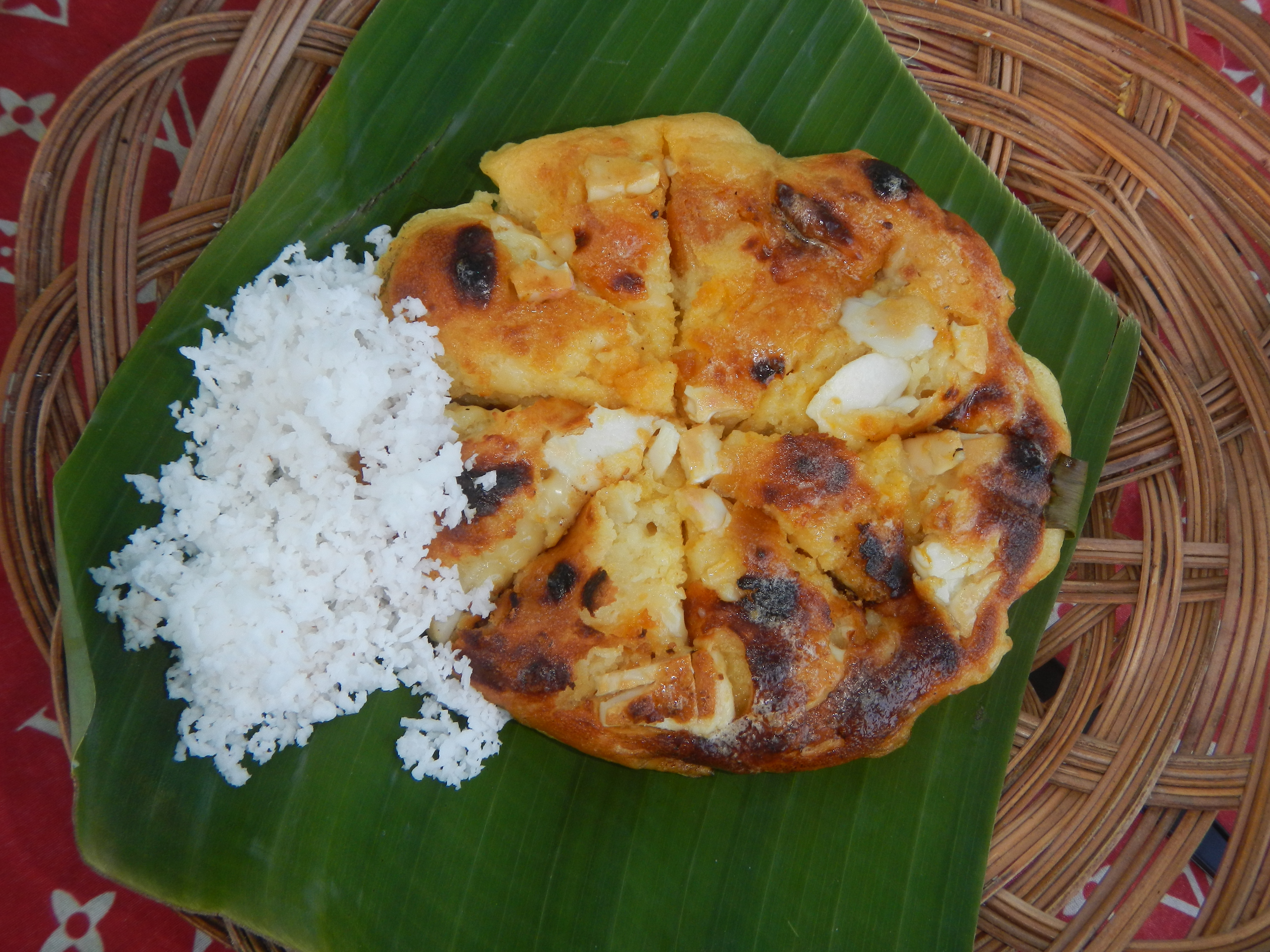
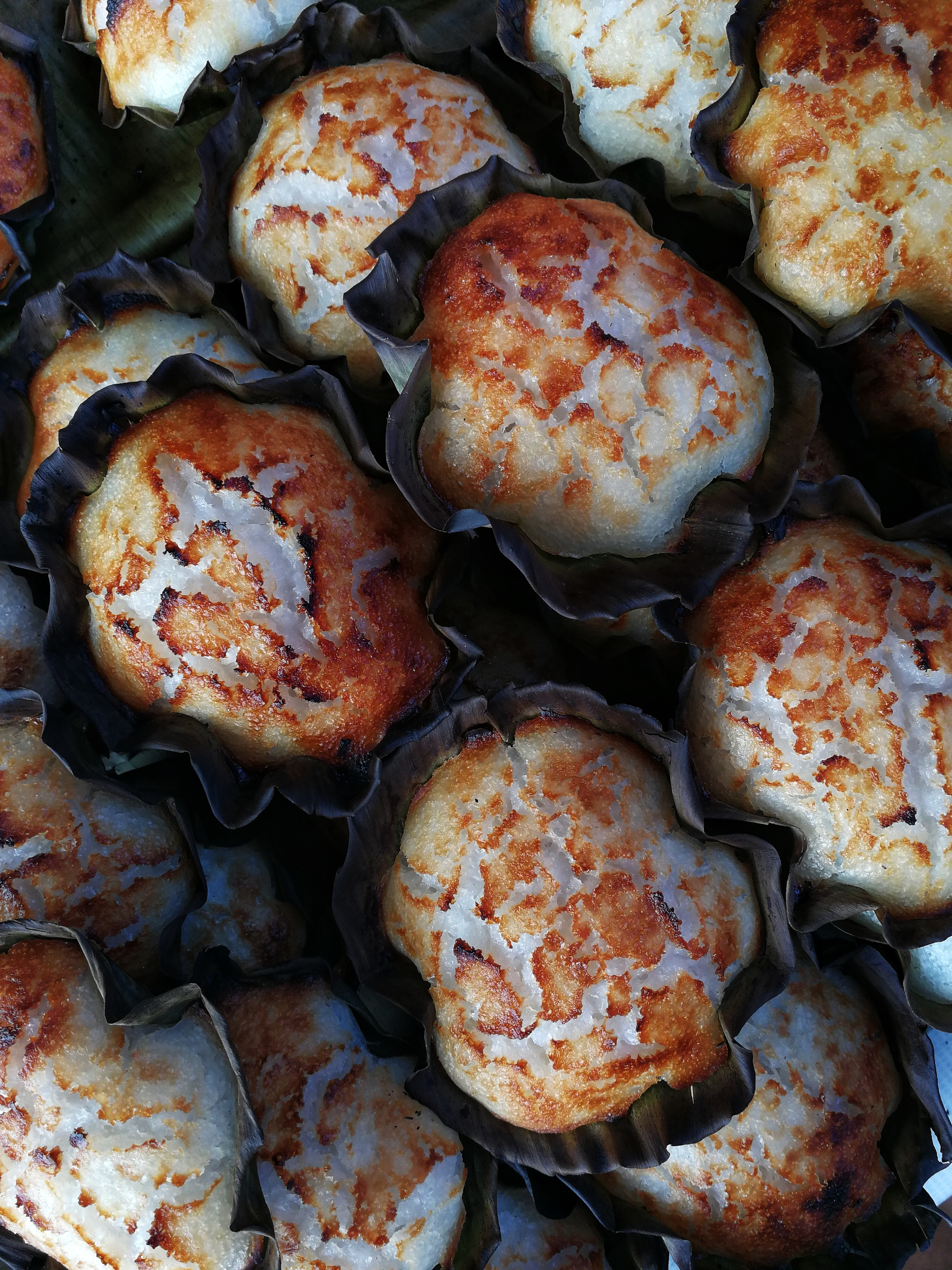
- Bibingka from Baliwag, Bulacan (top), Visayan variant of Bibingka (bottom)
- Alternative names: Bingka, Bingkah, Vivingka
- Course: Dessert, breakfast, merienda
- Place of origin: Philippines
- Serving temperature: Hot or warm
- Main ingredients: Glutinous rice (galapóng), water or coconut milk
- Ingredients generally used: Butter, muscovado, grated cheese, desiccated coconut, salted duck egg
- Variations: Salukara, Cassava cake, Bibingkang Malagkit
- Similar dishes: Panyalam, puto

Bibingka (/bɪˈbiːŋkɑː/; bib-EENG-kah) is a type of baked rice cake in Filipino cuisine that is cooked in a terracotta oven lined with banana leaves and is usually eaten for breakfast or as merienda (mid-afternoon snack), especially during the Christmas season. It is also known as bingka in the Visayas and Mindanao islands.

Bibingka can also be various other Filipino baked rice cakes, for example, those made with cassava flour (bibingkang cassava / bibingkang kamoteng kahoy), glutinous rice (bibingkang malagkit), or plain flour.

== Etymology ==
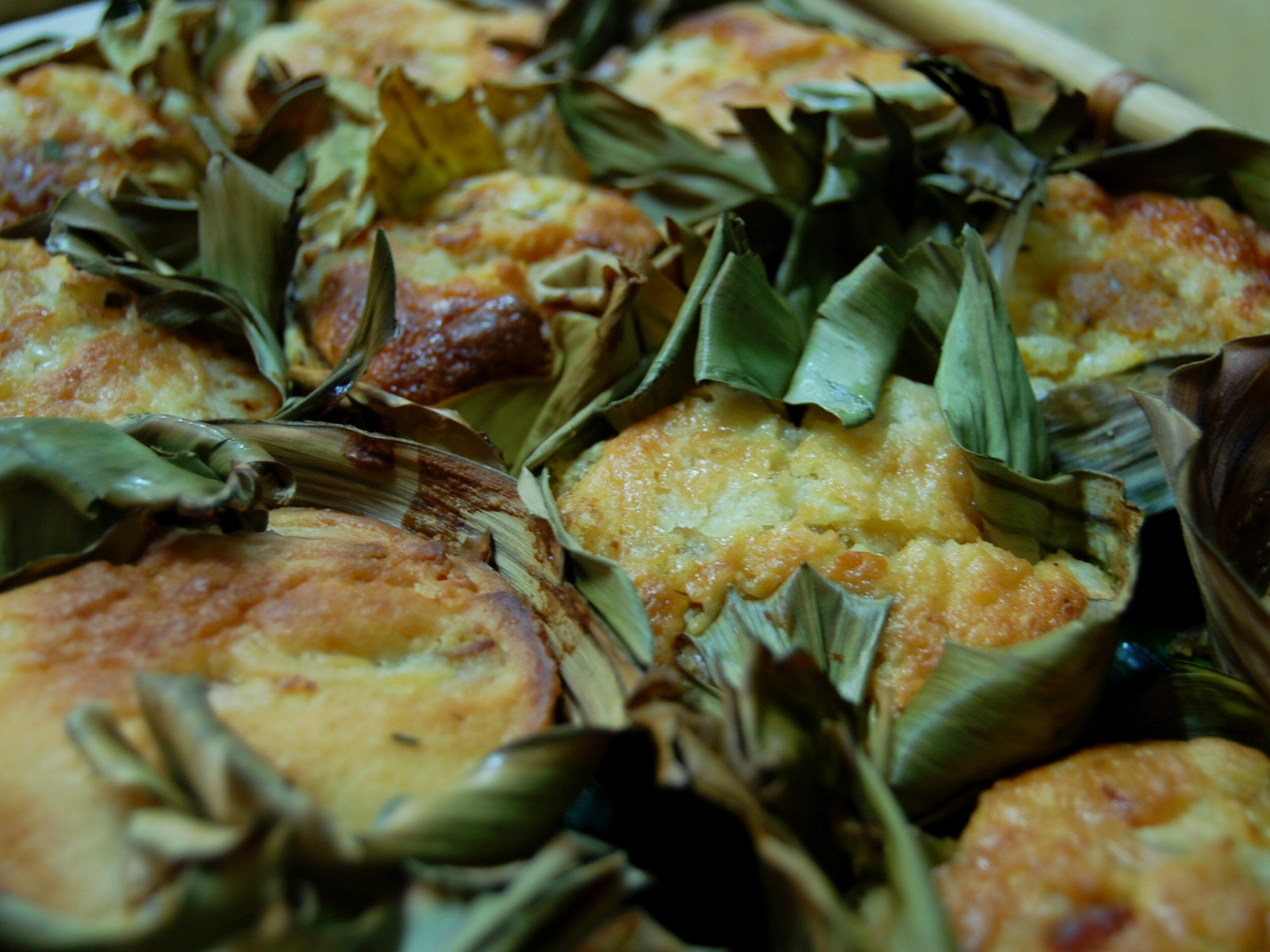
Bibingka Galapong cooked with slices of salted egg with toppings of grated coconut and kesong puti (carabao cheese)

The origin of the name is not currently known with certainty. The linguist Robert Blust hypothesizes that it was originally a loanword, likely from Malay [kue] bingka (a similar but different dish). However, the consistent partial reduplication of the word (bibingka) in most Philippine languages, is unexplained. In Macau and Portuguese Goa, there also exists a cake called Bebinca.

Bibingka is the name used for the dish in most languages of the Philippines, including Tagalog, Ilocano, Kapampangan, Pangasinan, Bikol, Maranao, and Mansaka. It is also known as bingka in Cebuano and Hiligaynon, bingka or bingkah in Aklanon, and vivingka in Ivatan.

== Description ==
Bibingka is a traditional Christmas food in Philippine cuisine. It is usually eaten along with puto bumbóng as a snack after attending the nine-day Simbang Gabi ('Night mass', the Filipino version of Misa de Gallo).

In 2007 the town of Dingras, Ilocos Norte in the Philippines sought Guinness World Records certification after baking a kilometer-long cassava bibingka made from 1,000 kilos of cassava and eaten by 1,000 residents.

The 82-year-old "Ferino’s Bibingka" is Philippines heritage rice cake founded by Ceferino and Cristina Francisco in October 1938 at their rented apartment in Juan Luna Street, Pritil, Tondo, Manila. From its 3 clay ovens, the couple opened a Manila Hotel complex restaurant in 1957. In 1970, J. Amado Araneta invited Francisco to open a branch at the old Fiesta Carnival. 1938 Francisco Food Specialties, Inc.'s President, Sonny Emmanuel V. Francisco and wife Anne, one of the seven children, revealed his father, Alfredo, who died in 2001, revived Ferino's Bibingka in 1981, in front of the Baclaran Church after Ferino's 1975 death. Using the traditional ‘kalan de uling,’ the company sells frozen ready-to-eat bibingka, minibibingka, extra super, super, special, bibingcute variants and toasted bibingka at its biggest Kalayaan Avenue store.

=== Preparation ===
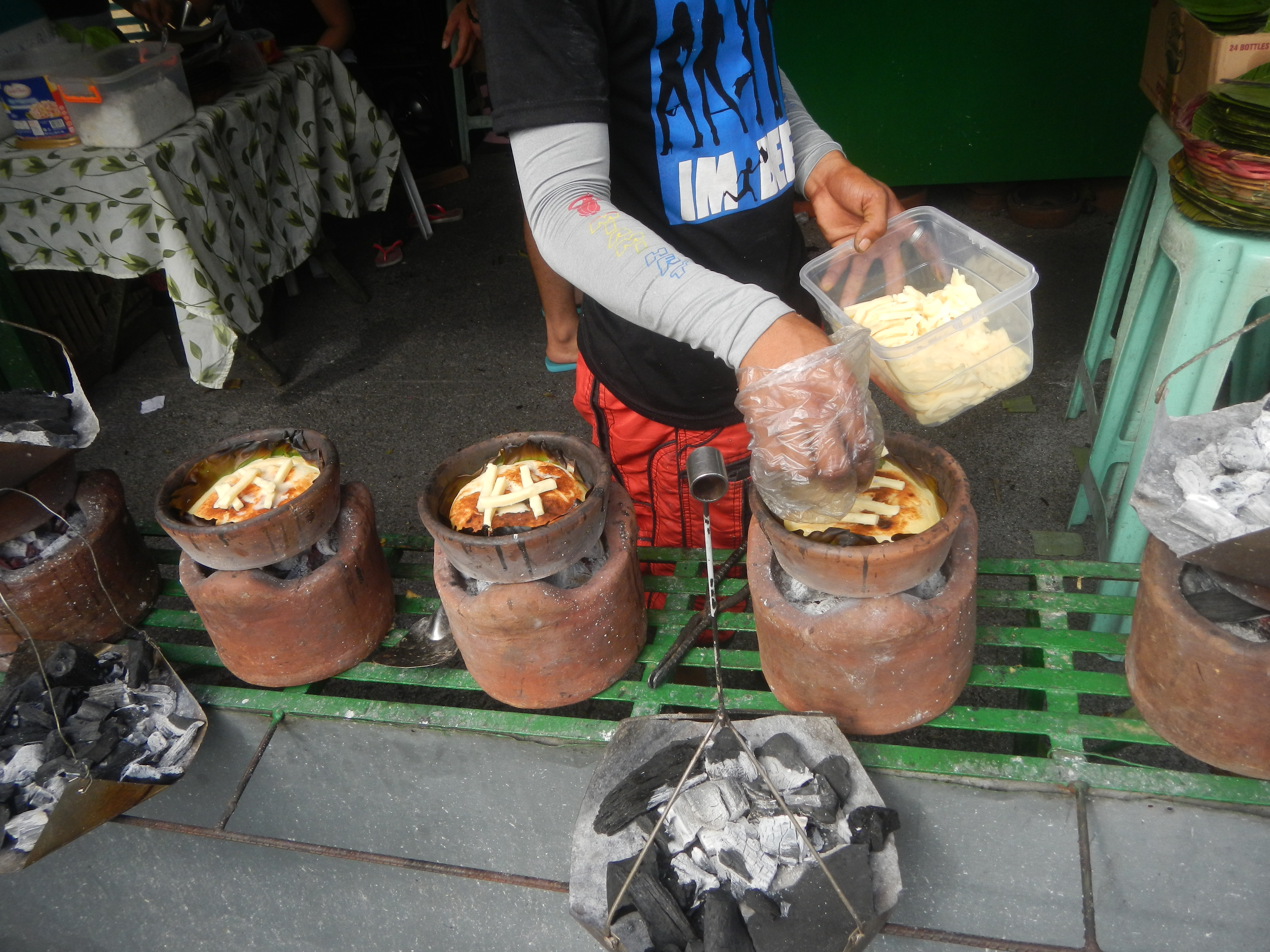
Traditionally prepared bibingka in Baliwag

In the traditional recipe for bibingka glutinous rice is soaked in water overnight in tapayan jars to ferment with wild yeast called bubod or tuba palm wine, then ground with a millstone or gilingang bato into a batter called galapong. The fermentation provide a faint aftertaste to the product. To save time, modern versions sometimes use regular rice flour or Japanese mochiko flour in place of galapong. Other ingredients can also vary greatly, but the most common secondary ingredients are eggs and milk.

Bibingka is cooked over coals in a shallow banana leaf-lined terra cotta bowl into which the rice flour mixture is poured. It is topped with sliced duck egg and cheese, covered with more banana leaf, and then with a metal sheet holding more coals. The result is a soft and spongy large flat cake that is slightly charred on both surfaces and infused with the aroma of toasted banana leaves. Additional toppings are then added, such as butter, sugar, cheese, or grated coconut.

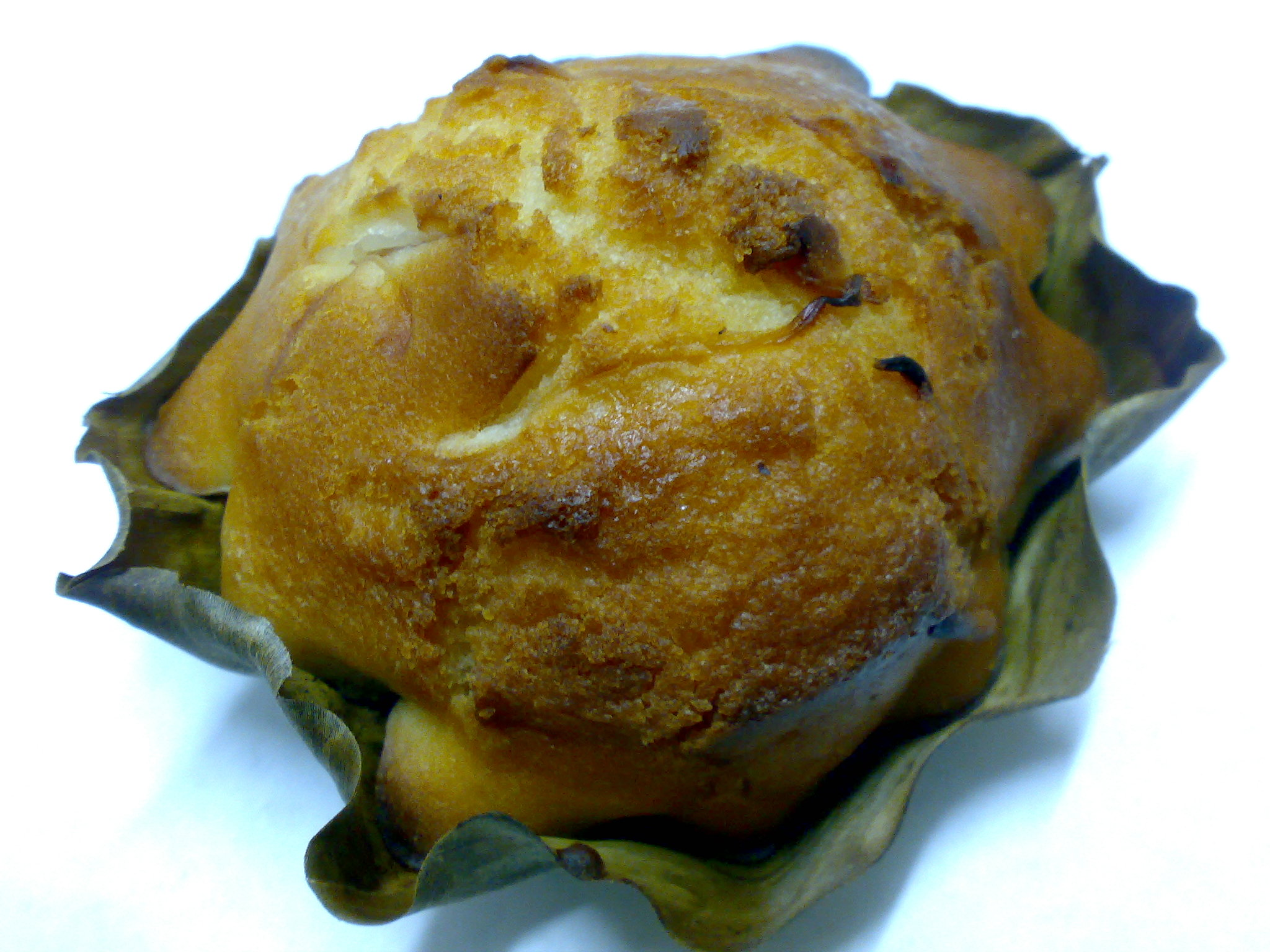
Bakery-made bibingka in banana leaf liner showing the notched edges from cupcake tin molds

More modern preparation of the dessert makes use of metal cake pans and purpose-built multi-tiered standing electric ovens. Mass-produced bibingka in Philippine bakeries are also made using tin molds that give them a crenulated edge similar to large puto or puto mamon (cupcakes).

== Variants ==
Bibingka is also used as a general term for desserts made with flour and baked in the same manner. The term can be loosely translated to "[rice] cake". It originally referred primarily to bibingka galapong, the most common type of bibingka made with rice flour. Other native Philippine cakes have also sometimes been called bibingka. These may use other kinds of flour, such as corn flour, cassava flour, or plain flour, and are usually considered separate dishes altogether. Some variations of bibingka differ only from the type of toppings they use. The common types of bibingka are listed below:

- Bibingka galapóng is the traditional form of bibingka made from ground soaked glutinous rice (galapóng), water, and coconut milk.
- Bibingkang malagkít is a moist version of bibingka, typically served sliced into square blocks. It commonly also includes slices of ripe jackfruit (langka) and topped with latik (coconut caramel) and grated coconut. It is very similar to biko, except that it is baked and uses galapong instead of whole grain.
- Bibingkang Mandaue (Mandaue-style Bibingka) are bibingka from Mandaue, Cebu. It is traditionally made with tubâ (palm wine) which gives it a slightly tart aftertaste. Nowadays, tubâ is often substituted with yeast.
- Bibingkoy - a unique variant from Cavite which has a filling of sweetened mung beans and served with a sauce of coconut cream, jackfruit, and sago. It is very similar to mache, but is baked instead of steamed.
- Bingka dawa - It is made with dawa (foxtail millet) along with rice flour, and comes from Asturias, Cebu.
- Buko bibingka - Bibingka baked with slivers of young coconut flesh (buko).
- Cassava cake is made from grated cassava (instead of rice), coconut milk, and condensed milk. It is the most similar to pudding in appearance. Also known as cassava bibingka or bibingkang kamoteng kahoy.

- Cassava buko bibingka - a variant of cassava cake that adds young coconut (buko) to the recipe.
- Pineapple cassava bibingka - a variant of cassava cake that adds crushed pineapple chunks.
- Royal bibingka - a variant of cassava cake from Vigan, Ilocos Sur shaped like cupcakes with a cheese and margarine topping.

- Durian bibingka - Bibingka baked with durian flesh. A specialty of the Davao Region in Mindanao.
- Salukara, a pancake-like variant of bibingka from Eastern Samar. It also uses tubâ and is traditionally cooked in pans greased with pork lard.
- Sinukat a type of bibingka baked in half of a coconut shell.
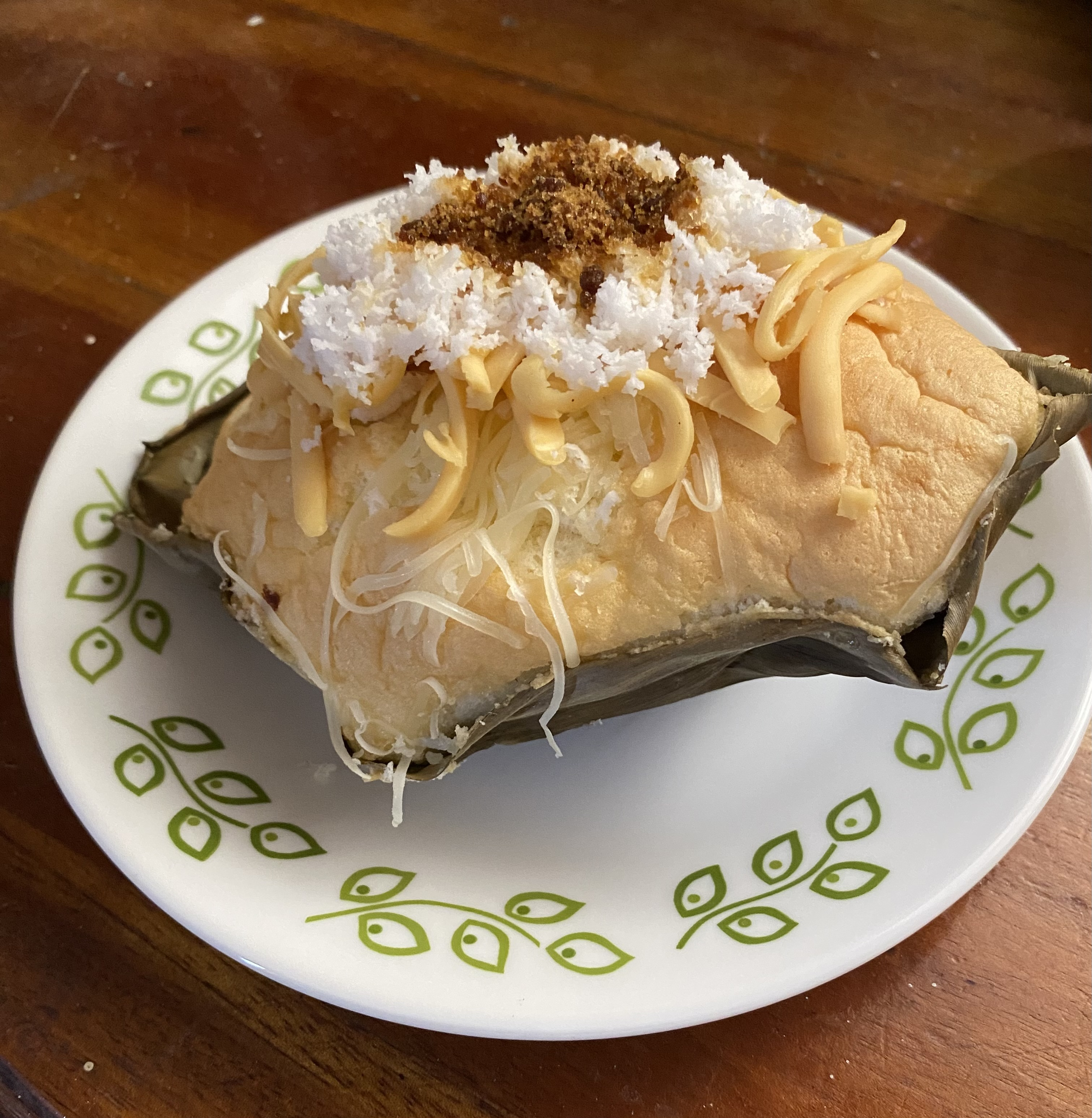
Bibingka topped with cheese, grated coconut, and muscovado sugar

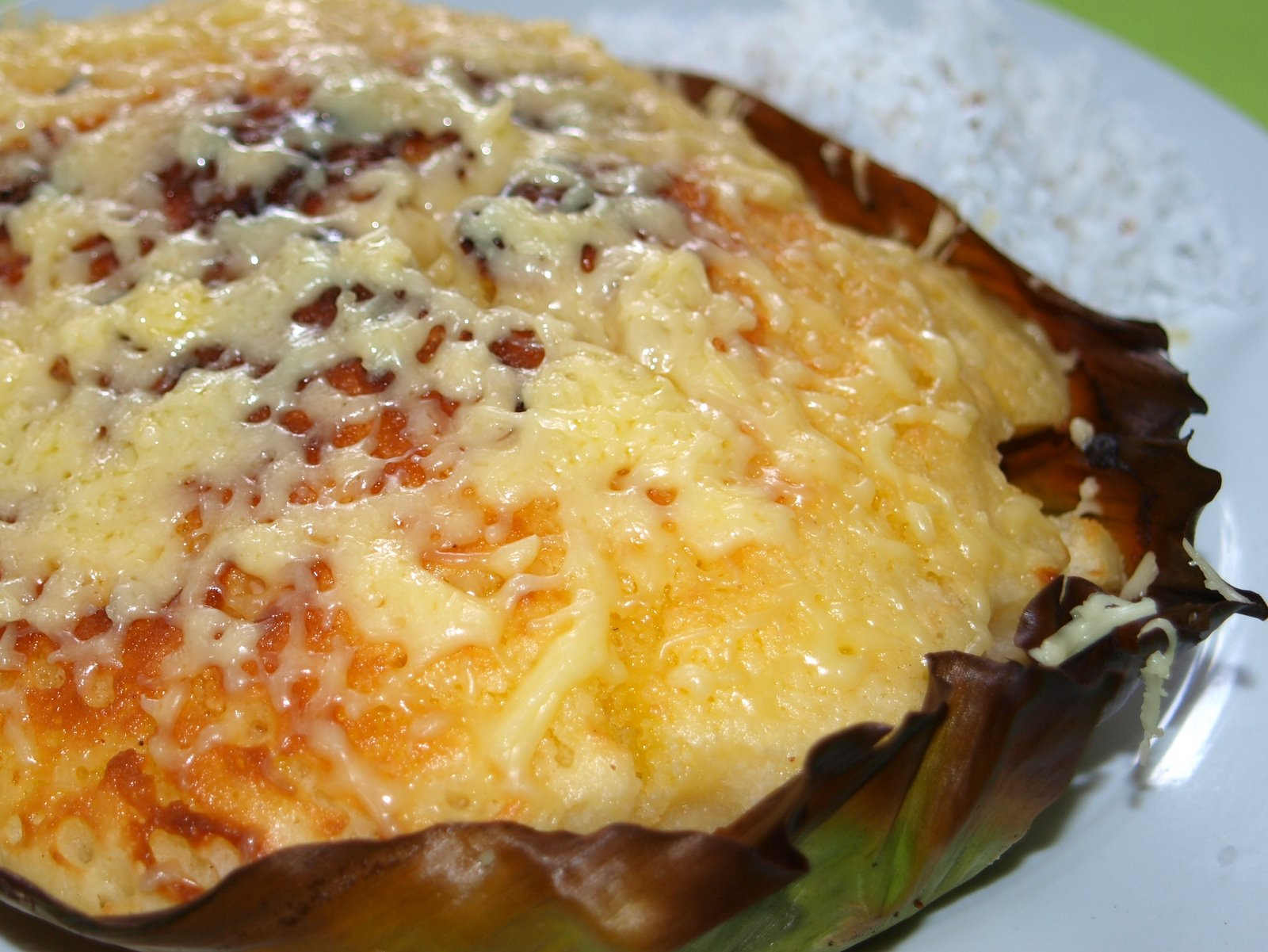
Bibingka from Tagaytay, Cavite

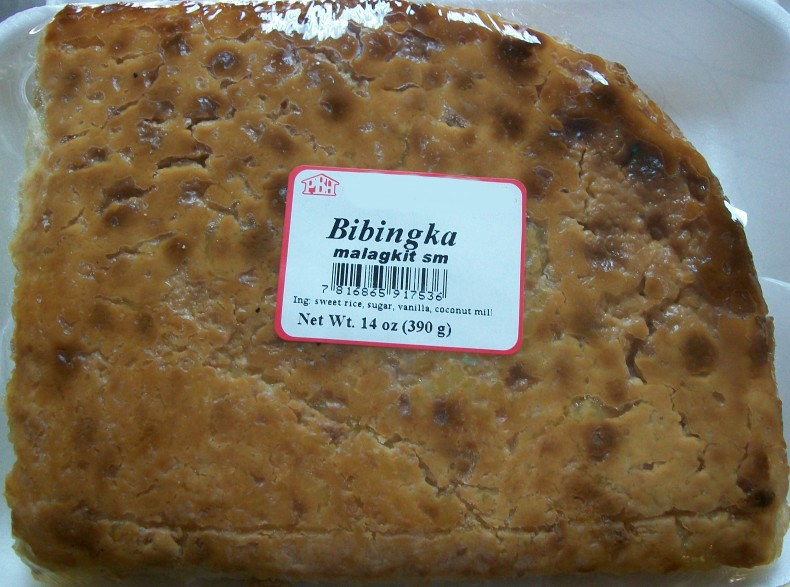
Bibingkang malagkit, a moist version of bibingka

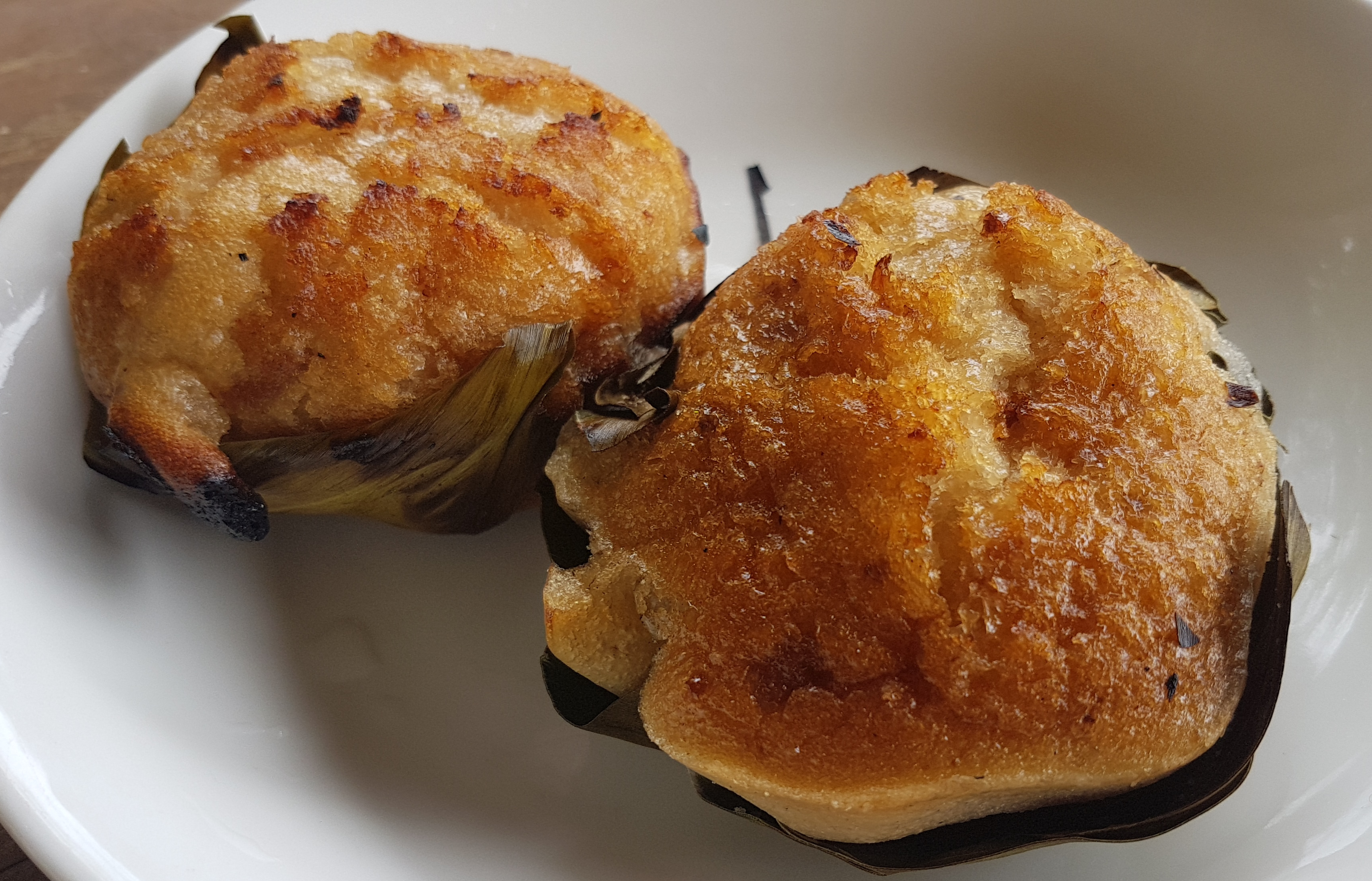
Bibingka from Mindanao

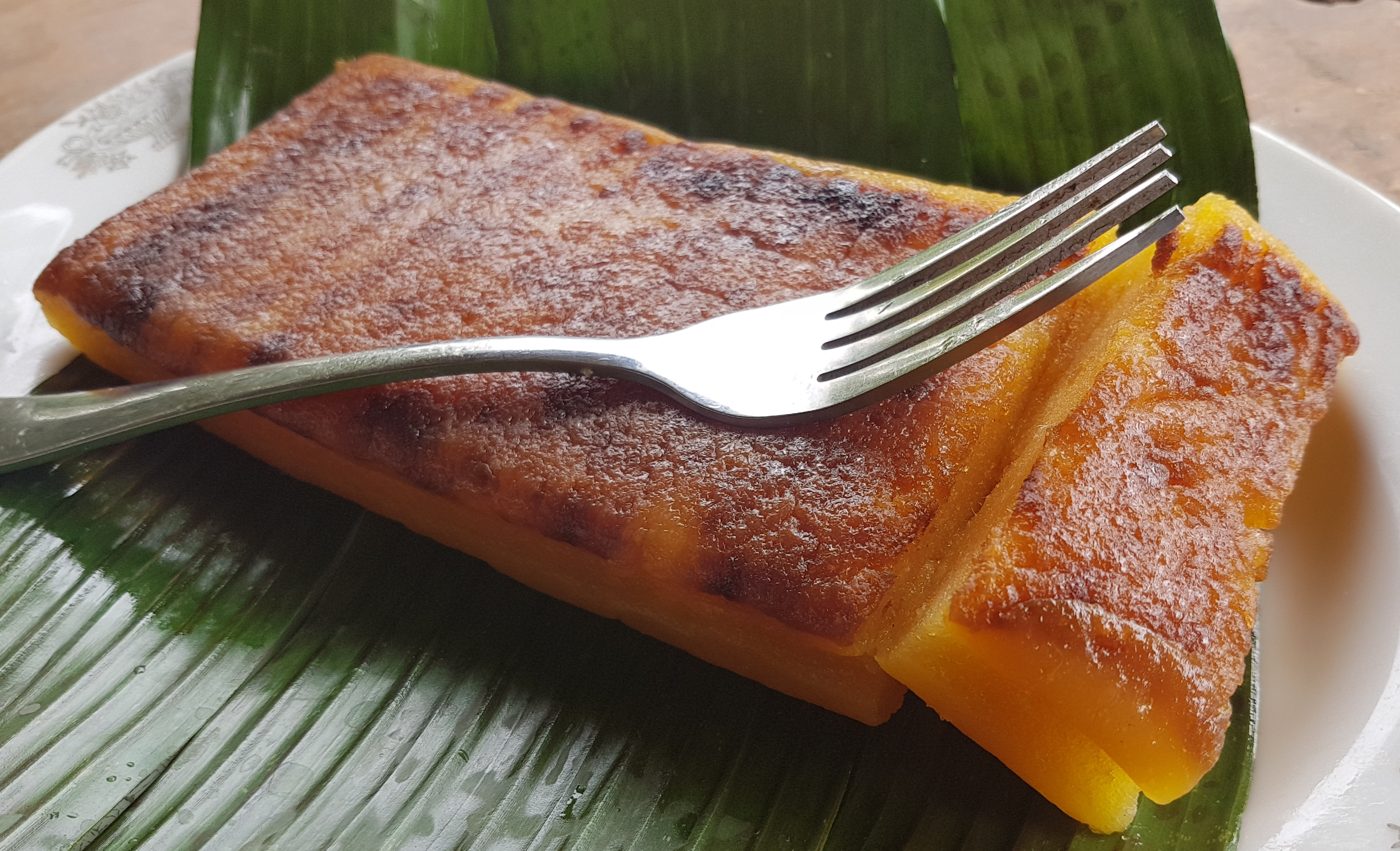
Bibingkang kamoteng kahoy, better known as cassava cake, a variant made from cassava

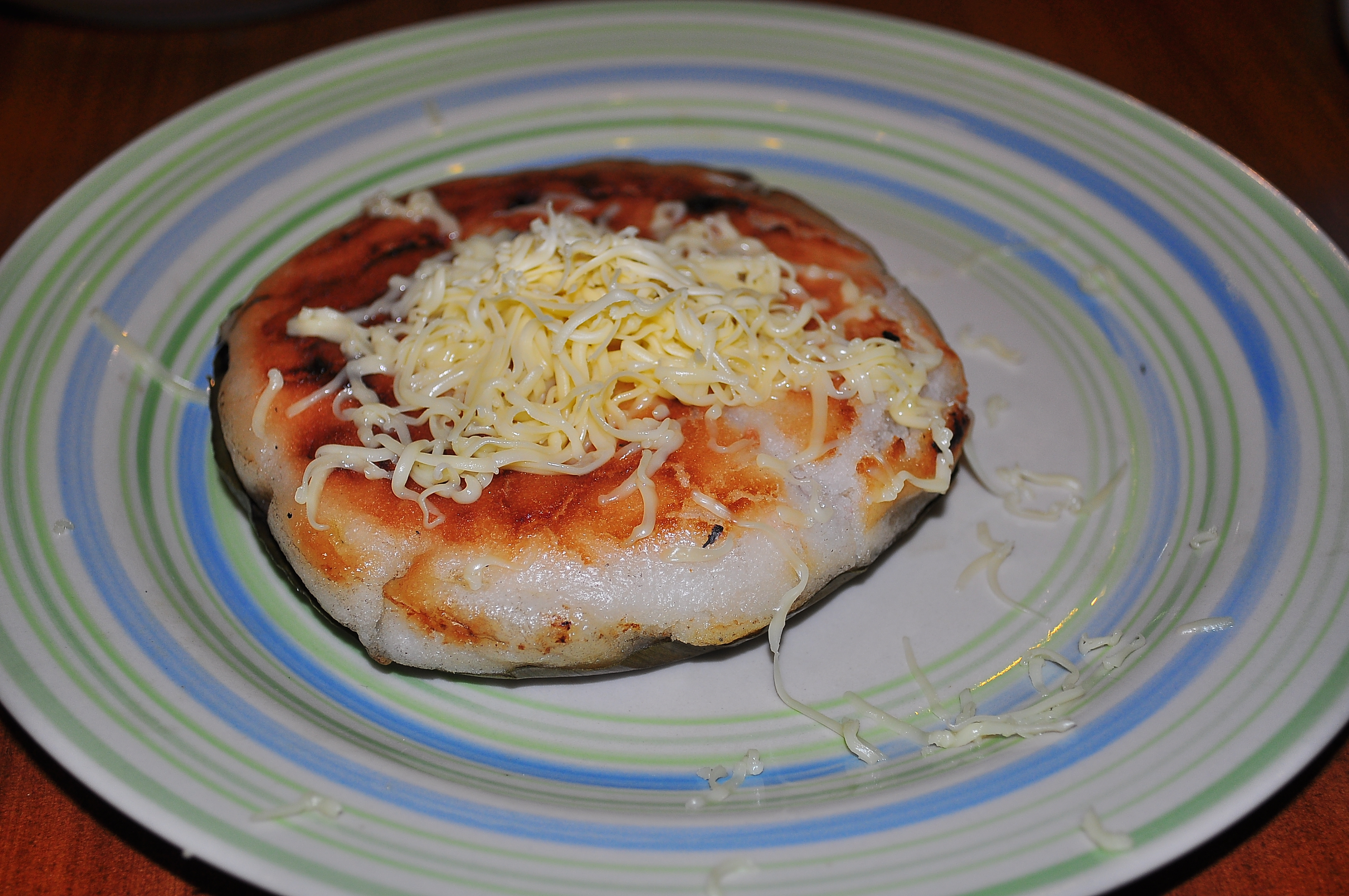
Bibingka with cheese toppings

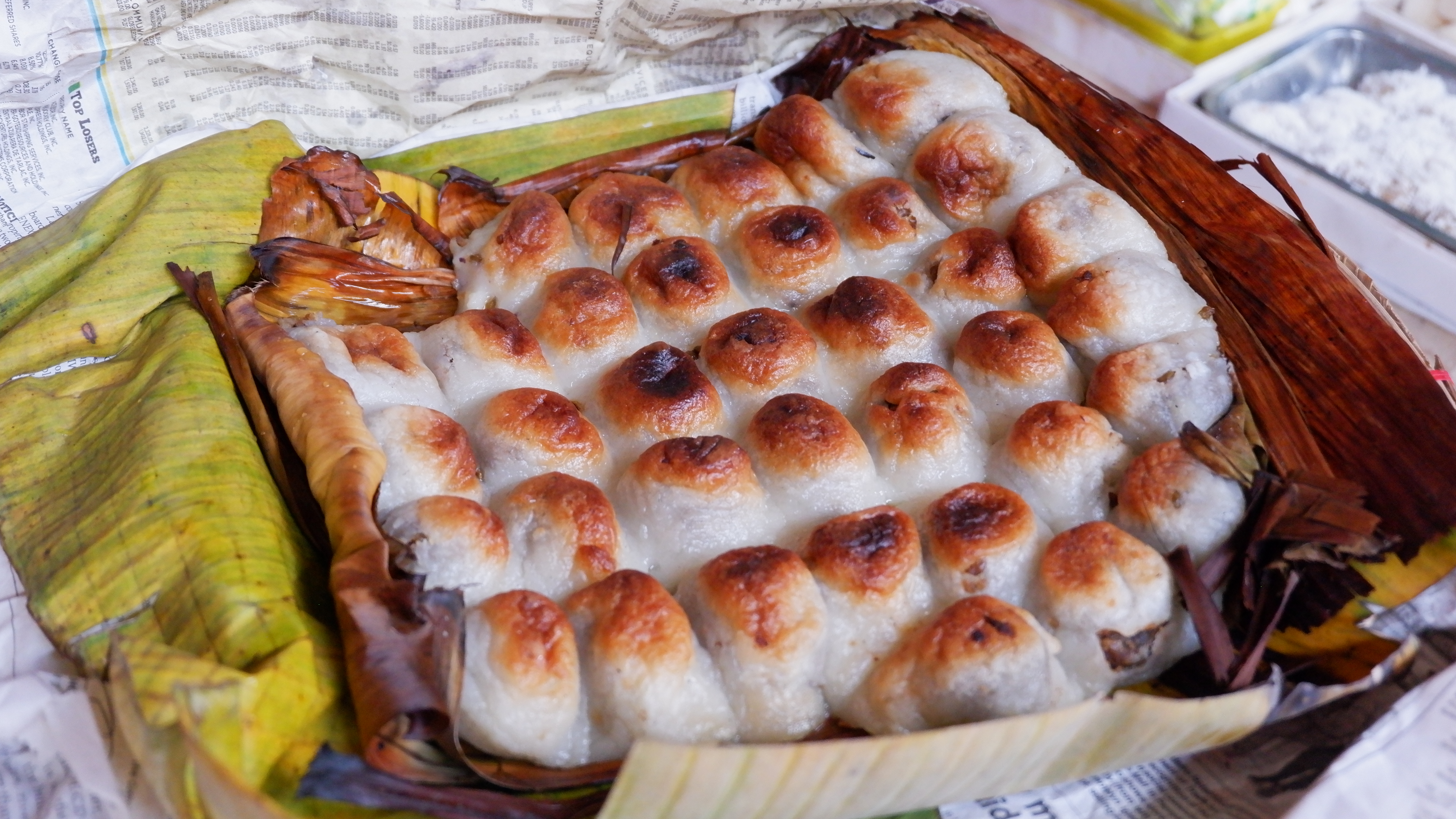
Bibingkoy in Cavite City

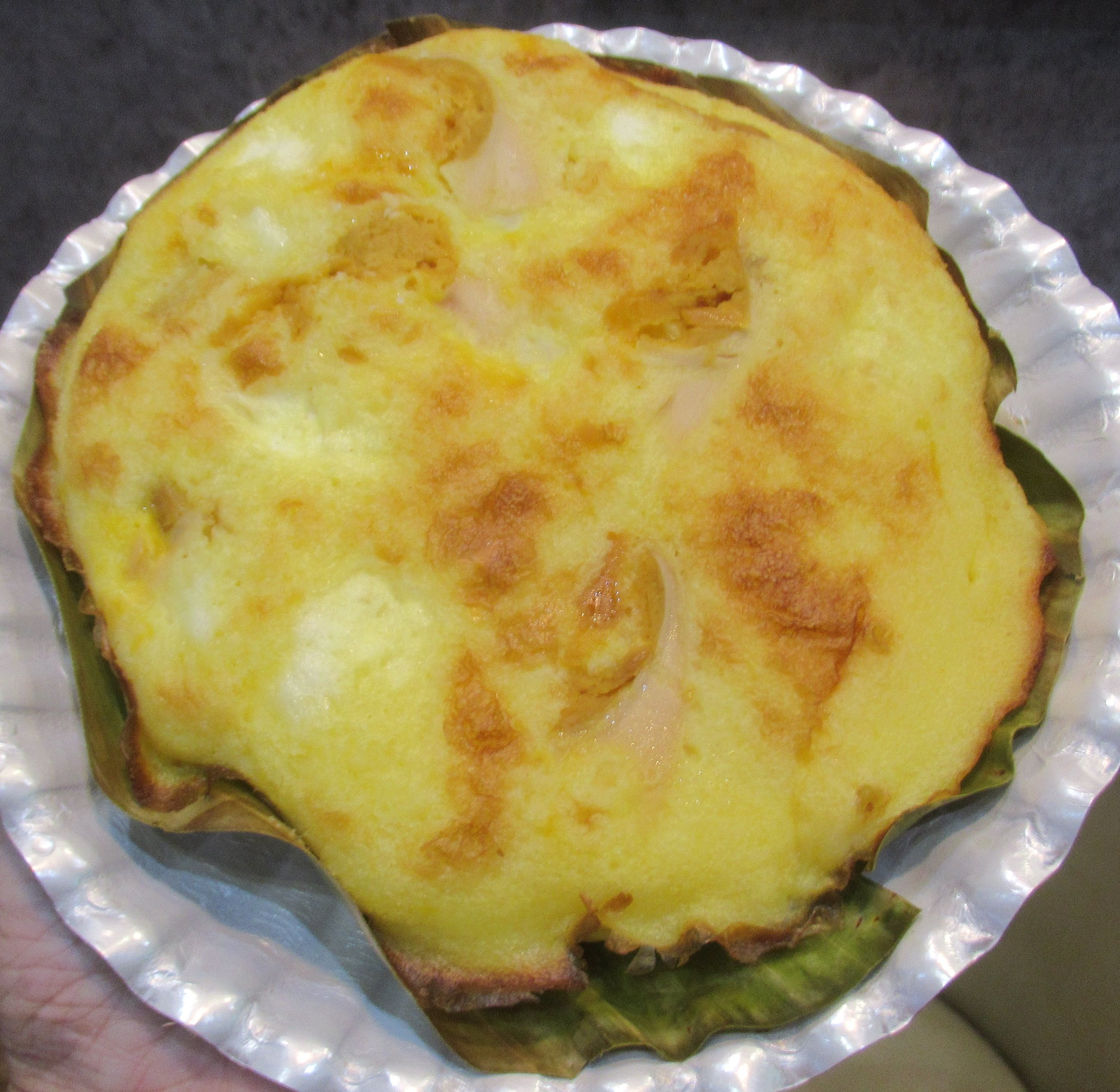
Ferino's Bibingka (since 1938)

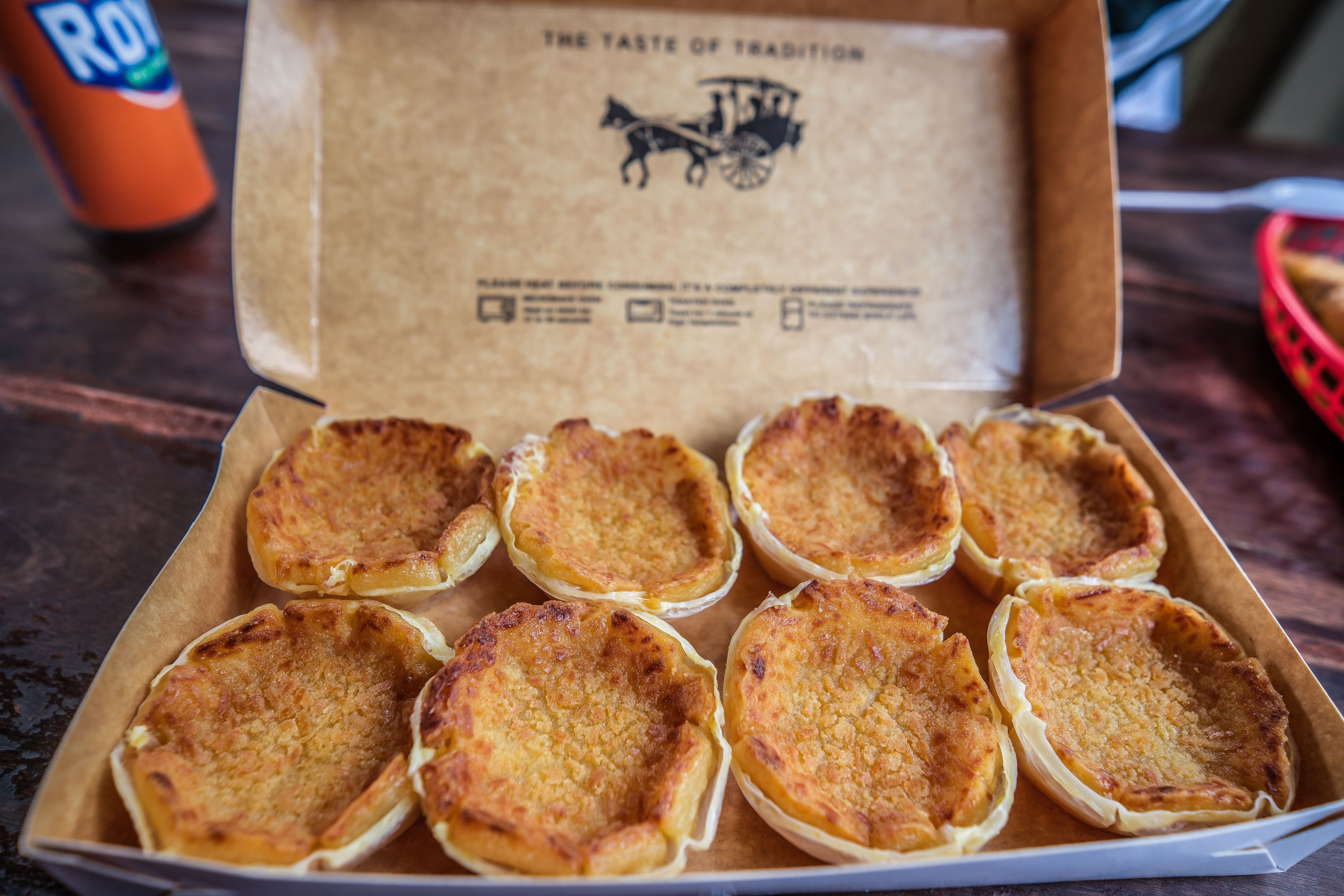
Royal Bibingka from Vigan City, Ilocos Sur

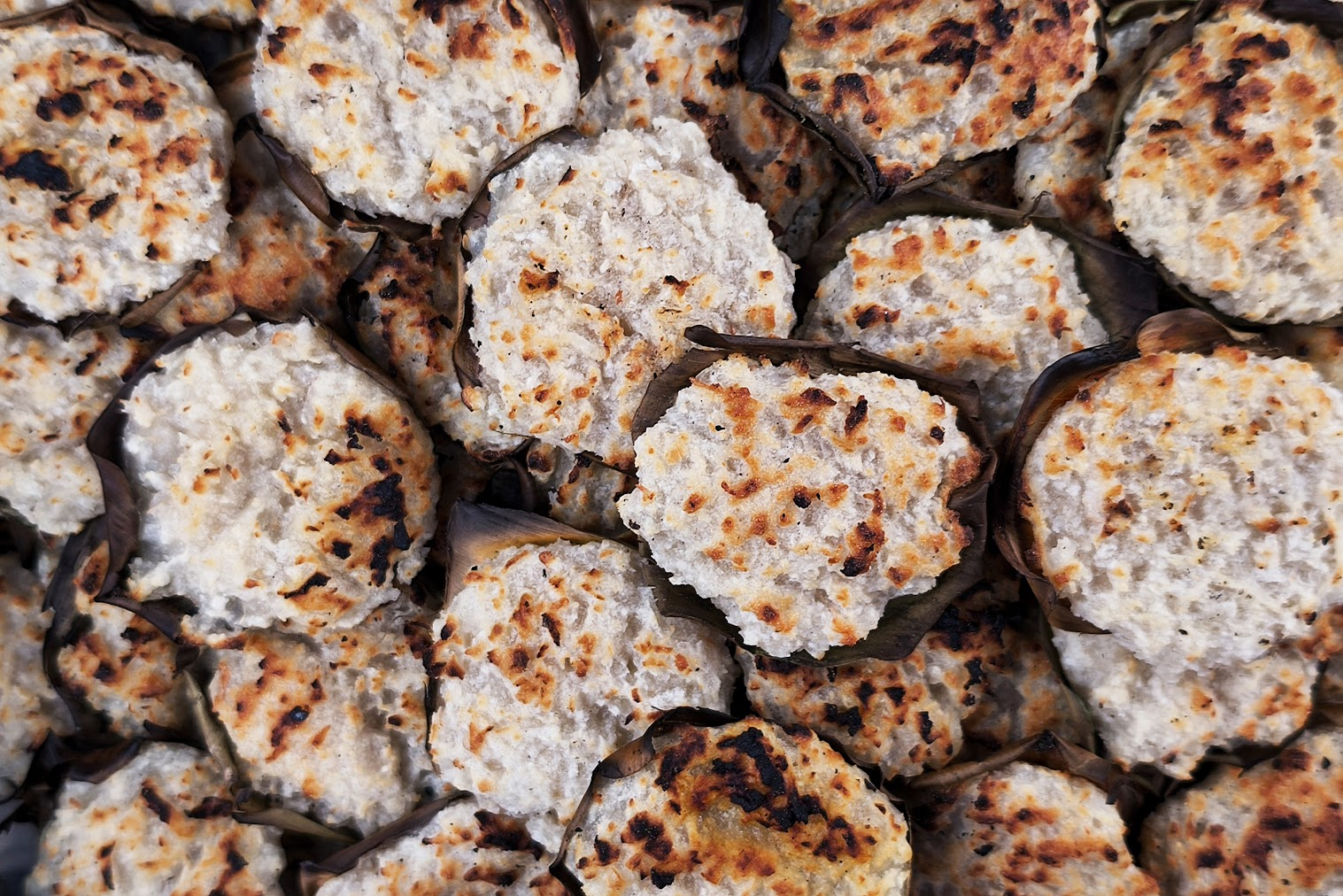
Another rendition of Bibingka in Iloilo City

== In Eastern Indonesia ==
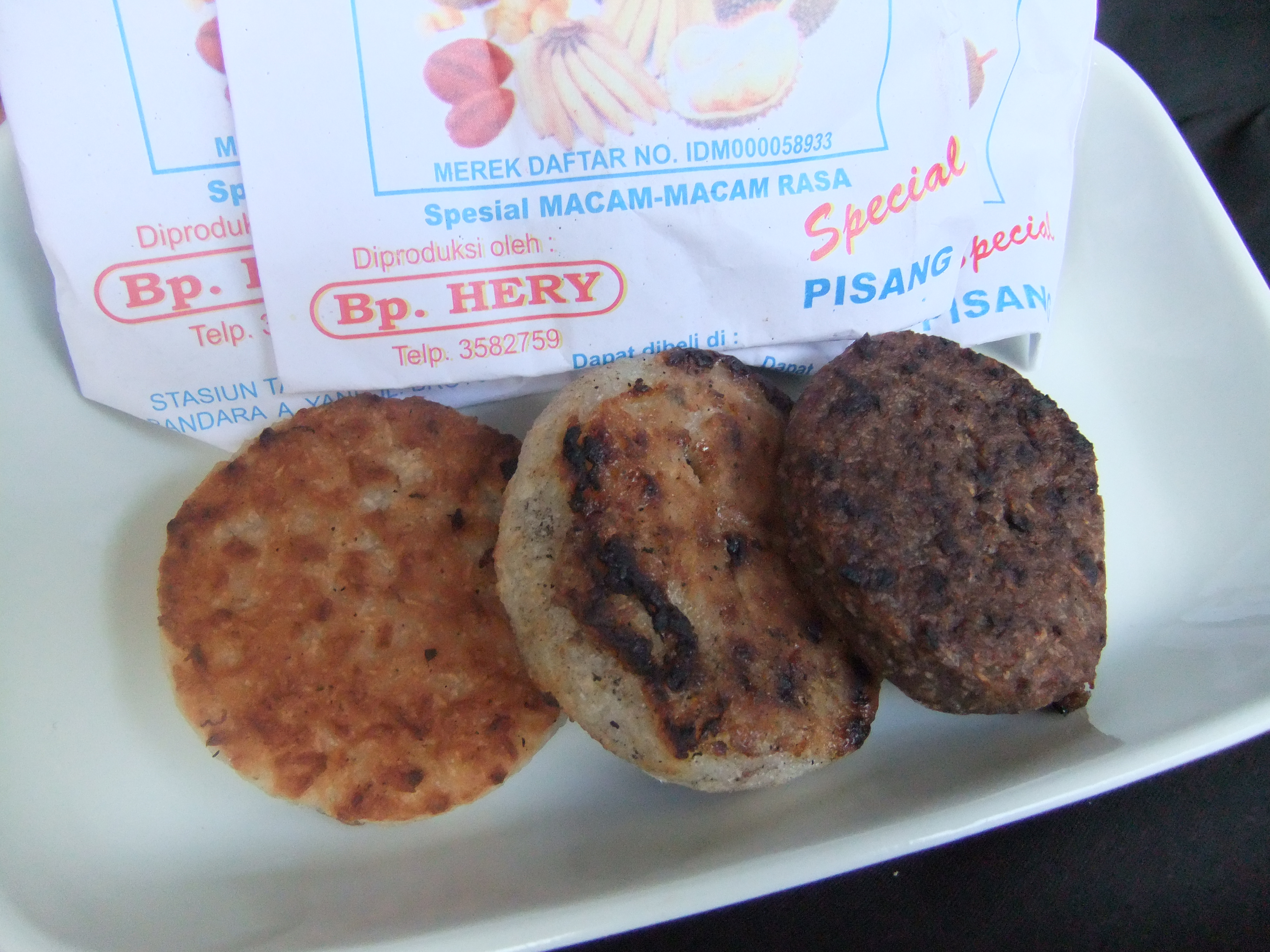
Wingko babat semarang from Java, Indonesia

Bibingka or bingka is also popular in Indonesia, particularly among Christian-majority areas in northern Sulawesi and the Maluku Islands, both of which were former colonies of the Portuguese Empire and are geographically close to the southern Philippines. It is prepared almost identically to Philippine bibingka. In the provinces of North Sulawesi and Gorontalo, bibingka is usually made with rice or cassava flour and coconut milk with shredded coconut baked inside. In the Maluku Islands, bibingka is spiced and sweetened with brown sugar or sweet meat floss. It is also traditionally cooked in clay pots lined with banana, pandan, or nipa leaves. As in the Philippines, it is also usually eaten during the Christmas season.

A pancake-like variant of bibingka was introduced to the Chinese Indonesian communities of East Java during the Dutch colonial period. Known as wingko, wiwingka, or bibika, it became popular throughout the island of Java.

=== Variants ===
- Bibingka kelapa or bibingka santan, Indonesian bibingka made from rice flour and coconut milk, topped with jackfruit or coconut
- Bibingka kelapa, Indonesian bibingka made from rice flour and coconut milk, topped with jackfruit or coconut
- Bibingka abon, made from rice flour and coconut milk, topped with meat floss
- Bibingka ubi telo, made from ube or cassava flour and coconut milk
- Bibingka nanas or wingko nanas, made from ube or cassava flour and coconut milk with pineapple

== See also ==
- Bebinca, a similar cake from Macau and Portuguese Goa in India
- Wingko, a similar rice cake from western Indonesia
- Kue bingka, a similar cake from the Banjar and Malay people of Indonesia
- Tupig
- Espasol
- Kakanin
- Kalamay
- Kue
- Panyalam
- Puto
- Puto bumbong
- Sapin-sapin
