= Pohulpohul =

Traditional Batak snack from Tapanuli, Indonesia

Pohulpohul (itak pohulpohul) is a traditional Batak snack from Tapanuli, Indonesia.

== The form and its contents ==
The form is like shaped fist like a finger form itak gurgur because the form tool is quite simple the fingers clenched. That is why it is called pohulpohul (fist).

Pohulpohul can be either raw or steamed, but the shape remains the same.

Pohulpohul cake contains nutrients such as:

- carbohydrates
- protein
- vitamins B1, B2, B3, B6
- iron
- calcium
- fat
- omega 3
- fiber

== Philosophy ==
Pohulpohul often becomes a souvenir for the family who came to visit in order to talk customary, for example, talk about marriage plans son and daughter both sides.

Of course this only pohulpohul souvenirs companion of mere souvenirs principal, in the form of food 'weight' of goldfish.

Pohulpohul whose shape follows the silhouette of a fist, the fingerprints are forming pohulpohul so that rice flour as the main ingredient to a solid and complement each other, a symbol of how the peoples talks between the two sides (paranak and parboru) connections. In a process characterized by dialogue and negotiation, occurs occasionally throwing words that pierce or offensive. However, as the pohulpohul where flour complementary and mutually self compacting, would be expected so the words are in talks bersiliweran custom, mutual complementarity and tamp with no other goal is to improve the traditional celebration that is being prepared.

== See also ==
- Tipatipa
- Lampet
