= Saksang =

Indonesian pork dishes

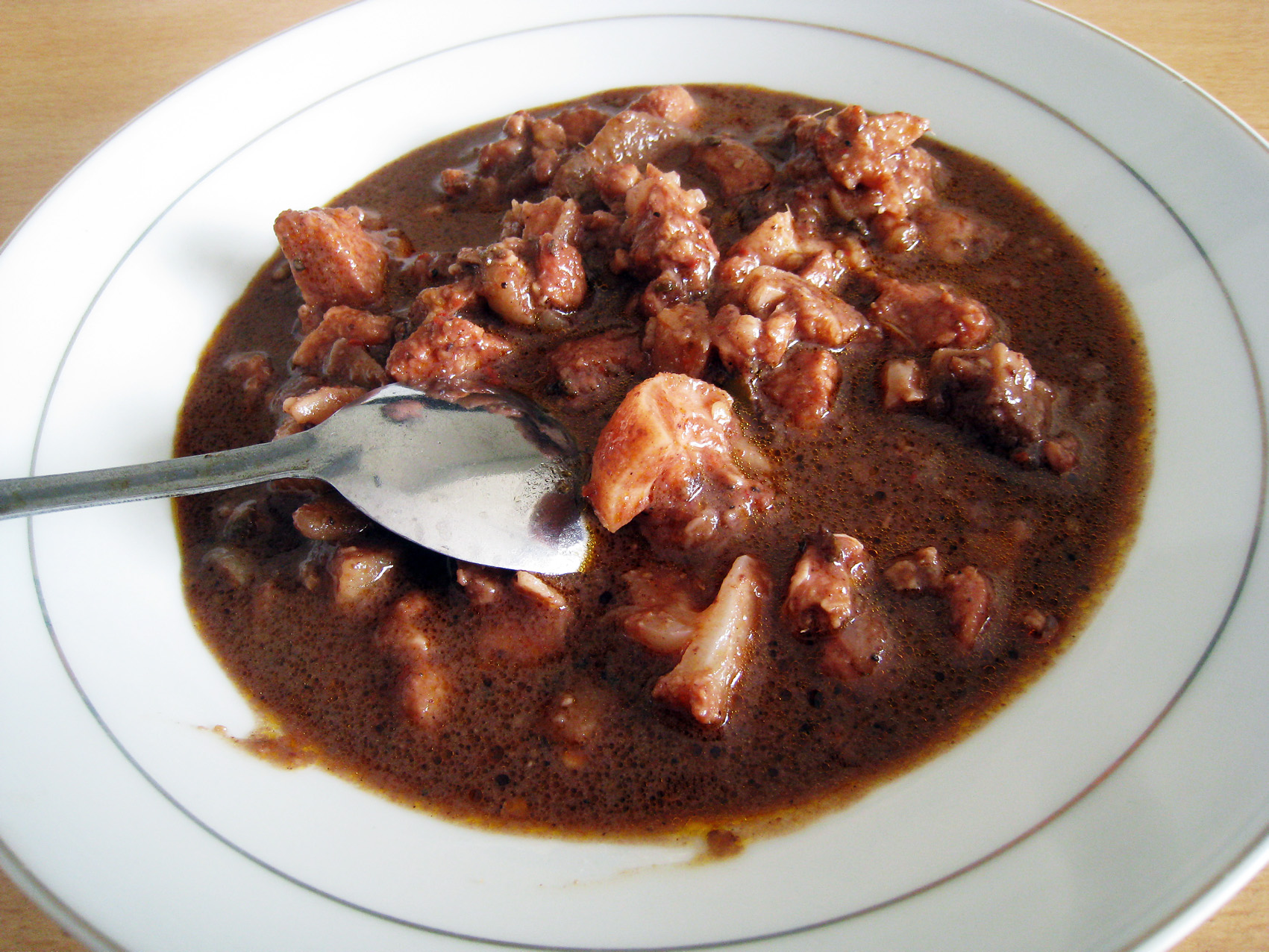
- Saksang served in a Batak restaurant
- Alternative names: Sa-sang
- Place of origin: Indonesia
- Region or state: North Sumatra
- Associated cuisine: Batak cuisine
- Main ingredients: Minced pork or dog meat stewed in blood
- Variations: Tango-tango

Saksang or sa-sang is a savory, spicy Indonesian dish from the Batak people. It is made from minced pork or dog meat (or, more rarely, water buffalo meat) stewed in its blood, coconut milk and spices; including kaffir lime and bay leaves, coriander, shallot, garlic, chili pepper and Thai pepper, lemongrass, ginger, galangal, turmeric and andaliman (the fruit of a native shrub similar to Sichuan pepper).

Although saksang is widely consumed and familiar within Batak tribes' traditions, it is more often associated with Batak Toba. Saksang has special significance to the Bataks, as it is an obligatory dish in Batak marriage celebrations. Saksang, together with panggang, arsik and daun ubi tumbuk, are the essential dishes in Batak cuisine.

== See also ==
- Rendang, a similar dish that is spicy but made with beef instead of pork and not served with blood.
- Beutelwurst
- Blood soup
- Dinuguan
- List of stews
- Svartsoppa
- Sarapatel
