= Natinombur =

Batak traditional fish dish

Natinombur is a typical Batak dish from North Sumatra, Indonesia. Dishes that use catfish or fish is processed mujahir burned and served with chili sauce. Carp or other fish can, which is important tomburnya is smeared condiments and sauces to fish.

== See also ==
- Saksang
- Sasagun
