= Manuk napinadar =

Indonesian dish

Manuk Napinadar or Chicken Napinadar is typical Batak cuisine in Indonesia that is usually served at certain customary feasts.

The sauce uses chicken blood. The chicken should be baked first, then watered with the blood of a chicken special sauce (Manuk) and mixed with andaliman and garlic powder and then cooked.

== See also ==
- Babi panggang
- Batak cuisine
