= Batak cuisine =

Cuisine of the Batak people of Indonesia

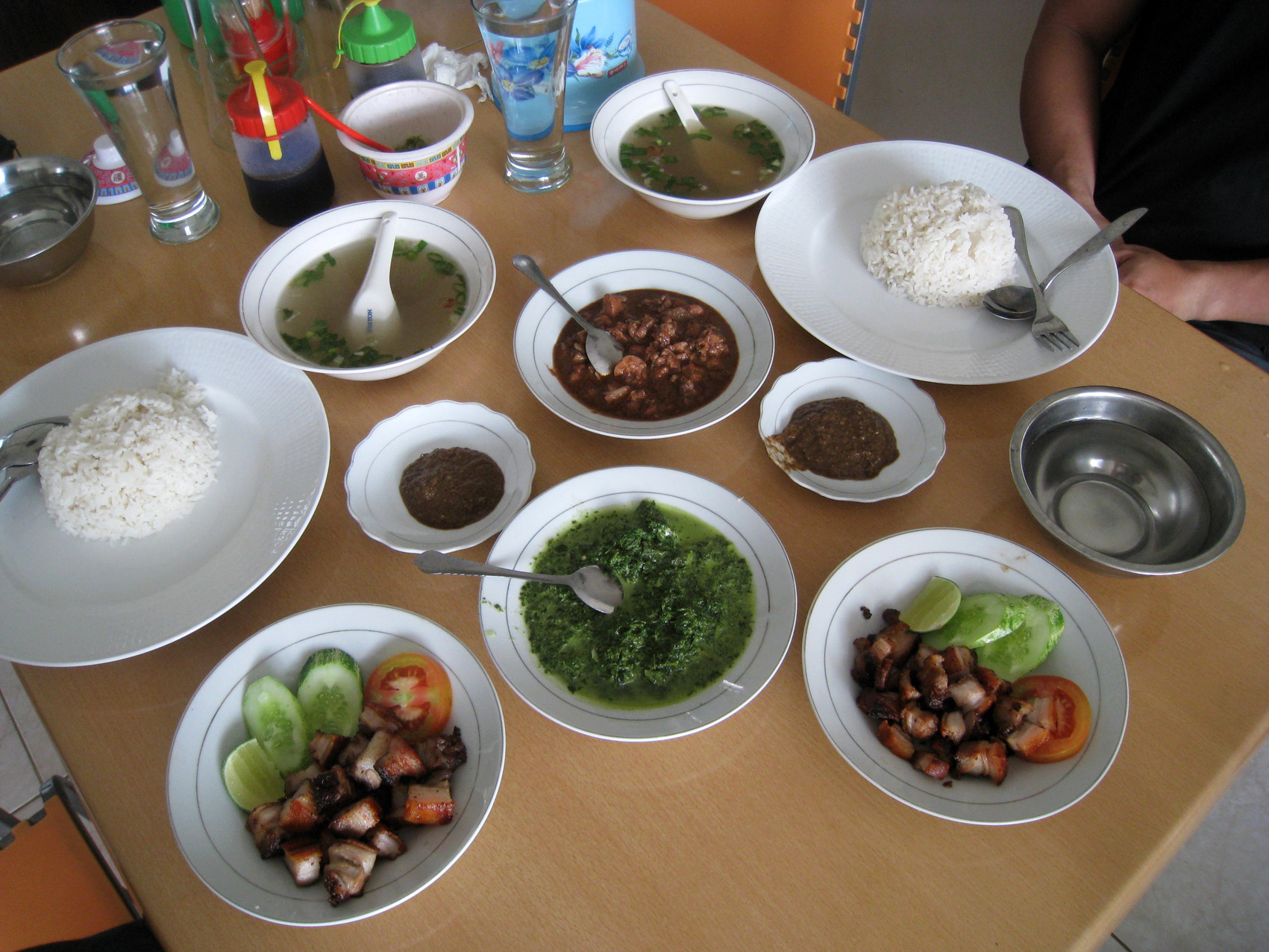
Saksang and panggang, the typical Batak dishes in Lapo (Batak restaurant).

Batak cuisine is the cuisine and cooking traditions of Batak ethnic groups, predominantly found in Northern Sumatra region, Indonesia. Batak cuisine is part of Indonesian cuisine, and compared to other Sumatran cuisine traditions, it is more indigenously preserved. One characteristic of Batak cuisine is its preference to andaliman (Zanthoxylum acanthopodium) as the main spice. That is why andaliman in Indonesia sometimes dubbed as "Batak pepper" (Indonesian: Merica Batak).

Batak people are majority Christian — unlike neighboring Muslim-majority ethnic groups such as Aceh and Minang — Christian Batak people are not restricted to Islamic halal dietary law. Many of the Batak's popular meals are made of pork as well as dishes made from unusual ingredients, such as dog meat or blood, however there are also halal batak dishes, mostly chicken, beef, lamb, mutton, and freshwater fishes.

Batak culinary centers are located in towns of Batak highlands, such as the town of Kabanjahe and Berastagi in Tanah Karo area. While some towns around the Lake Toba offers freshwater fish dishes such as carp arsik. The Northern Sumatra capital of Medan is also a Batak cuisine hotspot where numerous of Lapo (Batak eating establishments) can be found, yet the city is also a culinary center of halal Malay Deli, as well as Indian Cuisine and Chinese Indonesian cuisines. Outside its traditional lands in North Sumatra, Batak cuisine can also be found in Lapo in Jakarta, as well as most of the Indonesian major cities. Batak food is also widely present in Penang, Malaysia due to wide Batak migrant labour population found there.

== History ==
Cooking traditions in many parts of Sumatra often demonstrates foreign culinary influences; such as Minang, Malay and Acehnese cuisines featuring typical curry-like dishes heavily influenced by Indian and Arabic cuisines. Batak cuisine however, retain its indigenous Austronesian cooking traditions; such as cooking meats (especially pork) along with its blood. Similar dish can also be found in Filipino cuisine, such as dinuguan. However, since many tribes of the archipelago have converted to Islam, the non-halal dishes such as those using pork, dog meat, or blood, has been abandoned, and now only survive in non-Muslim areas, such as Batak lands.

== Spices and flavourings ==
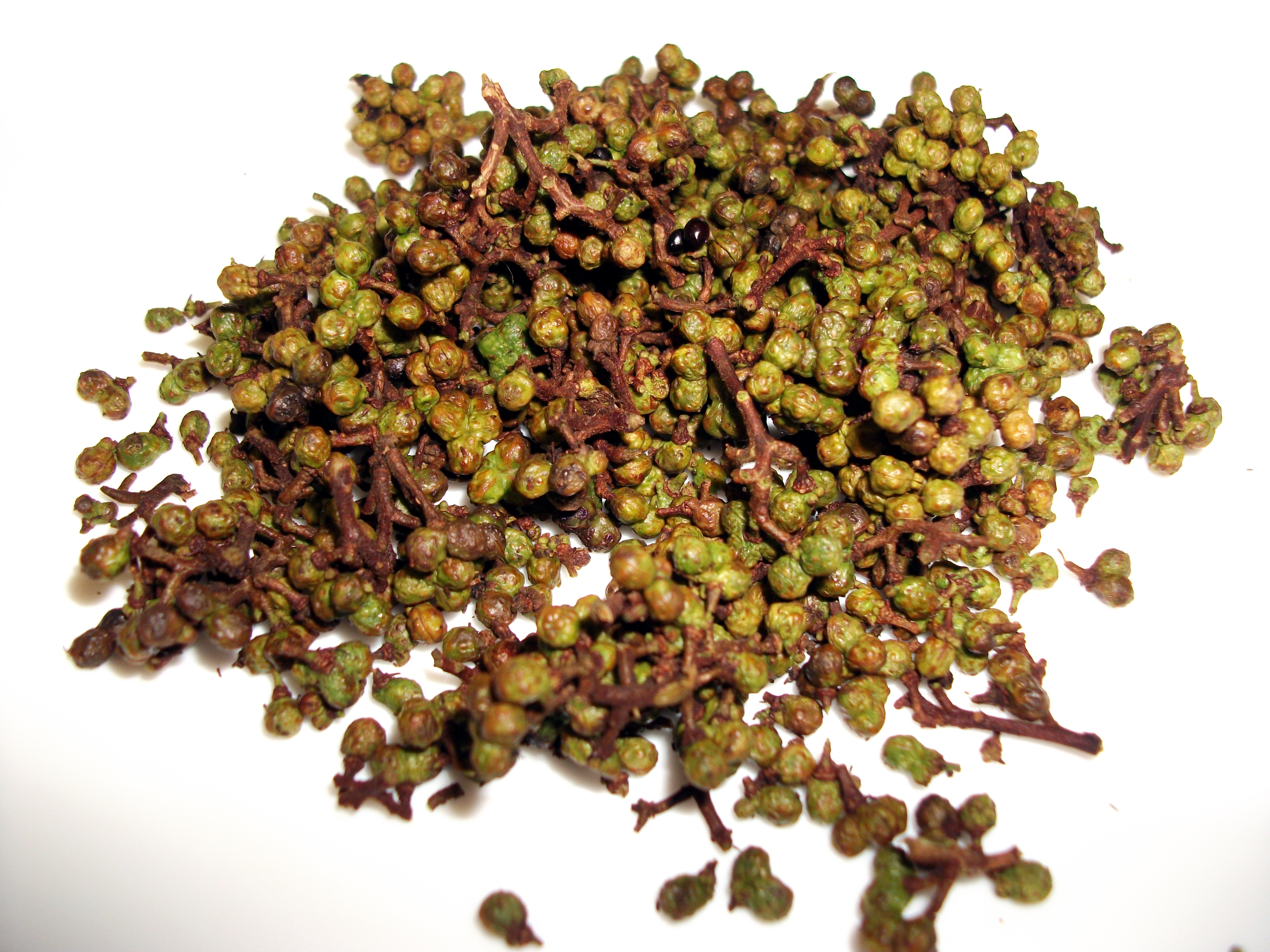
Andaliman known in Indonesia as "Batak pepper"

Regional differences between Batak and Acehnese culinary influences, among others, are characterized by the choice of spices; curry leaves or andaliman. Coastal Acehnese people using curry leaves (Murraya koenigii) as the main spice, while the Batak people prefer andaliman. Regions that use andaliman as main spices starting from the Gayo highlands in Central Aceh continue to the southeast up to Berastagi in Tanah Karo in North Sumatra.

The most widely used spice in Batak cuisine is andaliman and batak onion (chives), they are commonly used for all types of arsik. The most common Batak spicy sauce is called arsik — it is a Batak sauce made from the mixture of andaliman, turmeric, garlic and candlenut. There are many unique spices used in Batak cuisine recipes. Sambal Tuktuk for example use a mixture of andaliman and other spices. Other spices commonly used in Batak cuisine includes kaffir lime, Indonesian bay leaves, coriander, onion, garlic, chili pepper, pepper, lemongrass, ginger, galangal and turmeric.

== Meat ==
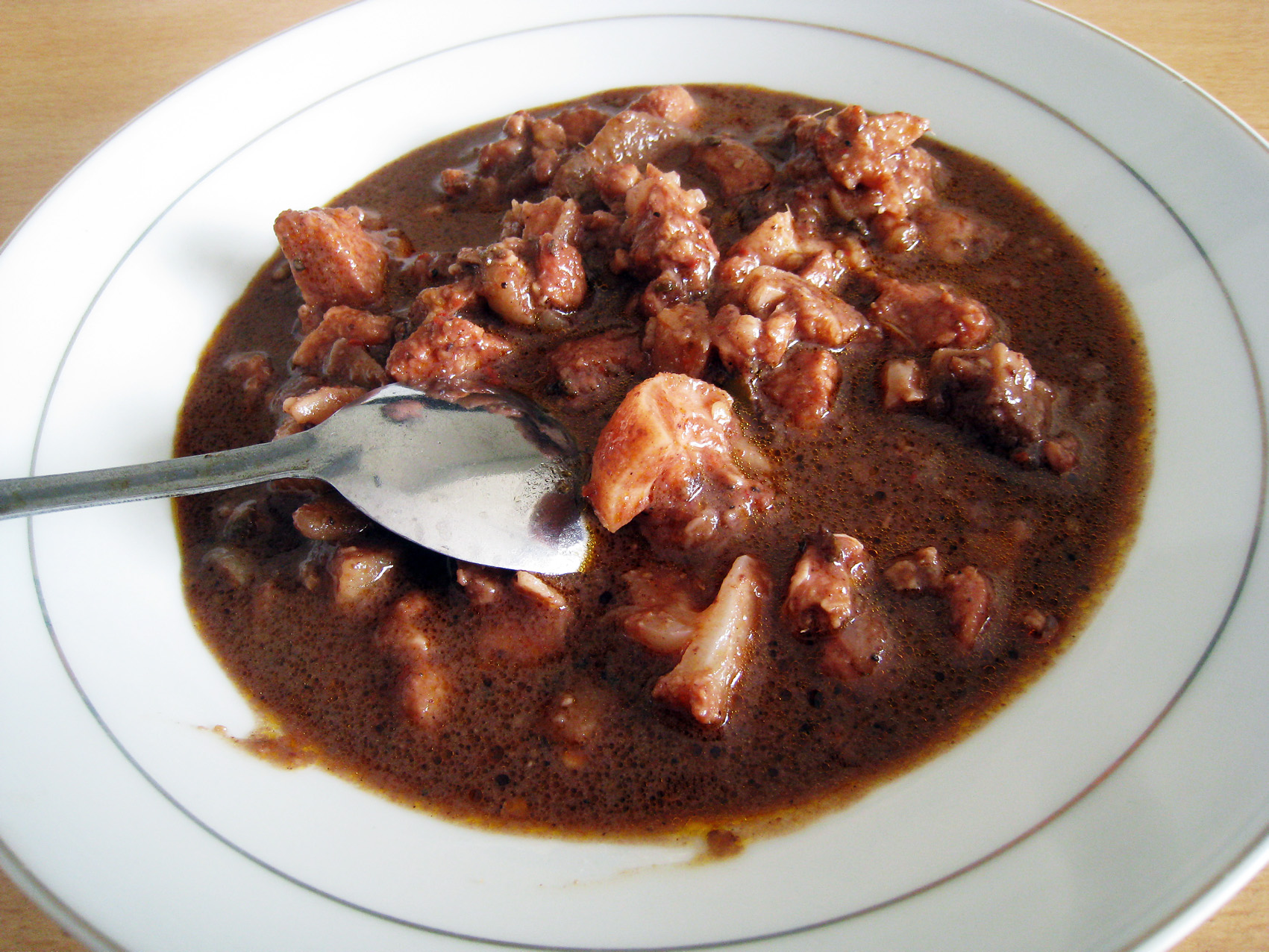
Saksang, pork cooked in spices and its own blood

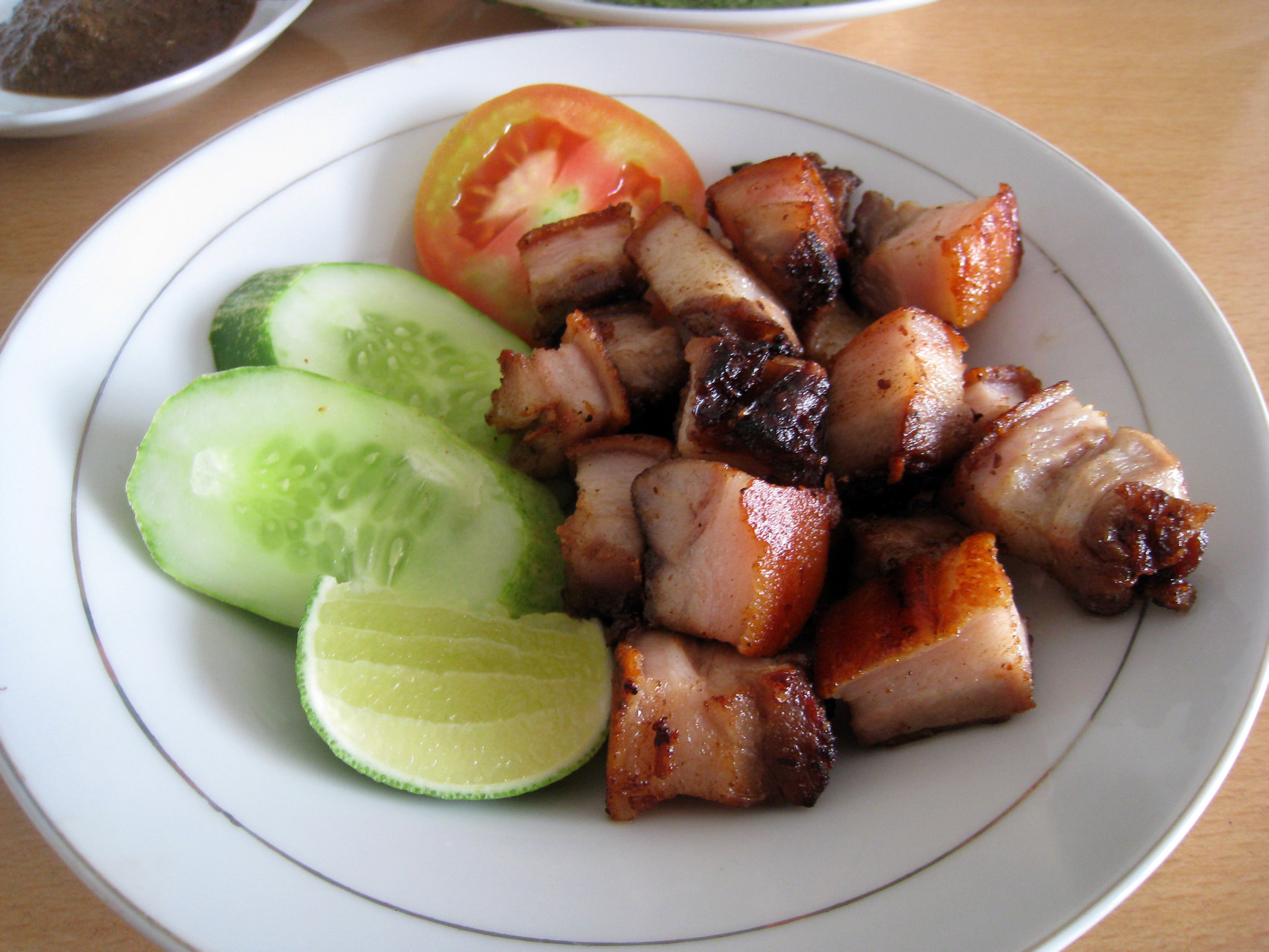
Panggang, Batak style roasted pork

For many centuries Batak tribes has led a relatively isolated way of life and maintained their ancestral belief systems. As the result a lot of the indigenous elements of their culture still survive, including their culinary arts. Today majority of Batak tribes are Christian, for example Batak Toba, Karo, and Pakpak. Pork and dog meats are commonly consumed. Dog meat is usually called B1, derived from biang, Batak word to refer a dog, while pork is often called B2 from babi. Pork (B2) or dog meat (B1) are usually cooked in its own blood, spiced and seasoned as saksang, or grilled as panggang.

However, there is also Muslim Batak tribes, such as Mandailing Batak tribe. They apply Islamic dietary law which only allows halal food and forbid consumption of pork, dog meat, and blood.

Popular Batak pork dish are saksang, fried cutlets sauteed pork in thick spicy blood sauces and Babi Panggang Karo (karo roast pork) — often shortened to BPK — which is locals' favourite and has become nationally famous through Lapo Batak restaurants nationwide. BPK consists of roasted pork slices with three accompaniments: a bowl of broth made from the essence of boiled pig's bones, a platter of porcine blood cooked with pepper and chili, and a saucer of extra-hot chili sauce.

Another common meat consumed in the Batak cuisine is buffalo meat, beef and chicken. Manuk Napinadar is a grilled chicken smothered in chicken blood itself, spiced with andaliman and garlic powder. Ayam Tasak Telu is one of popular chicken dish in Batak cuisine. Tasak telu literally means “cooking three times,” and consists of three dishes: the first part is boiled chicken< the second part is a sauce made of finely-ground corn kernels, spices and the remaining stock from the boiled chicken, the third part is an assortment of chopped vegetables and spicy coconut.

== Fish ==
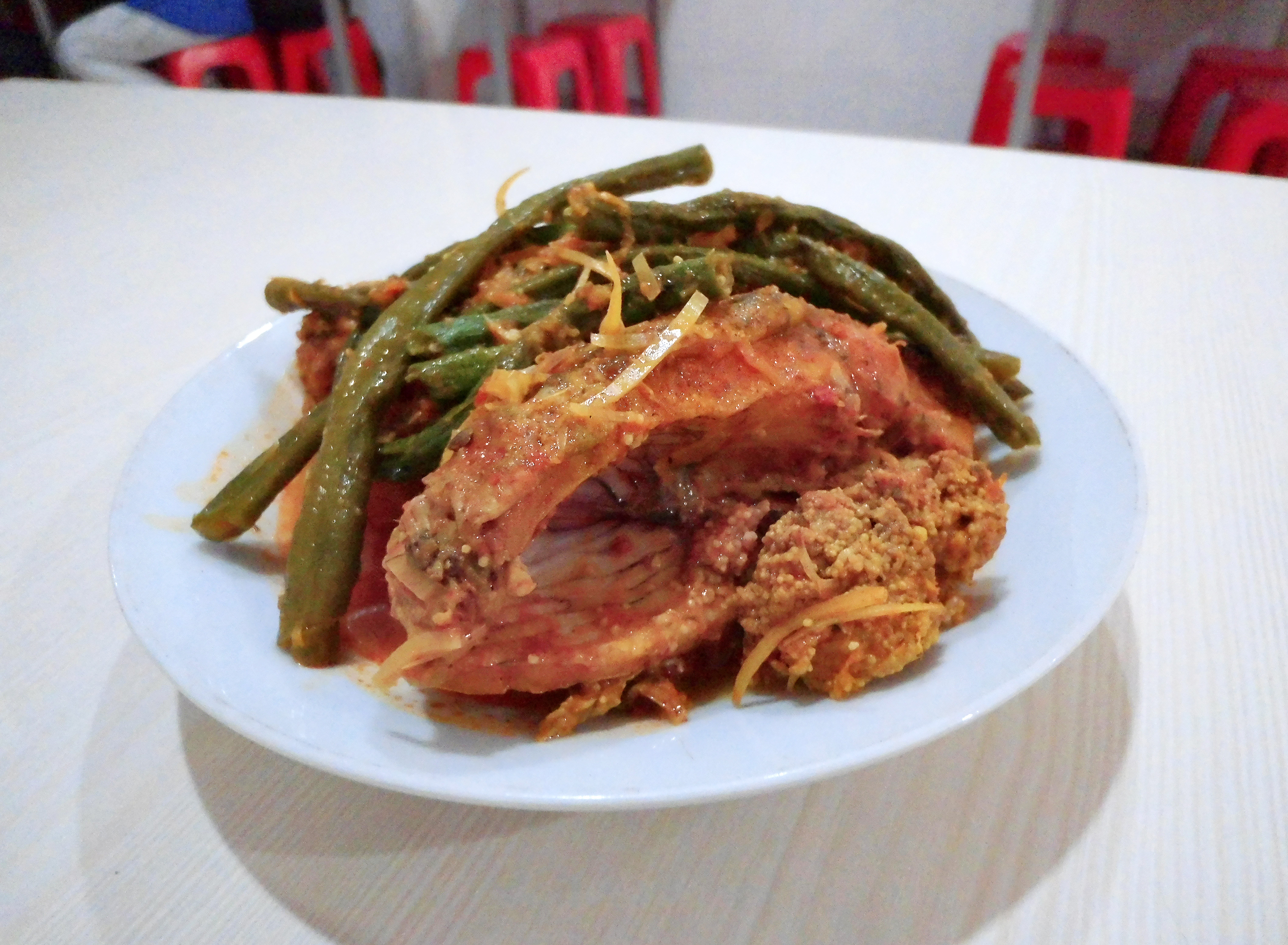
Carp Arsik, Batak style spicy fish

Since the Batak tribes live in the interior of North Sumatra, freshwater fish that live in rivers or Lake Toba is commonly consumed by locals. Carp usually cooked as Arsik or Dengke Mas na Niura, the fish is not cooked, but just seasoned and flavored in heavy spices. In addition to carp, catfish and tilapia are also consumed, usually cooked as Na Tinombur.

== Exotic dishes ==
Batak dishes sometimes use unusual meats such as dog meat (B1 or "biang" ) cooked as saksang or roasted as panggang.

One unusual notorious dish is Pagit-pagit that has distinctly pungent aroma. The ingredients include a brew of cassava leaves, santan (coconut milk), rimbang (a bitter but non-toxic variety of the nightshade family), flowers of some locally available plants and some arsik sauce, pork or beef meat, mixed with additional unusual substance — juice from a cow's cud, food that has been digested and regurgitated.

Another exotic and rare ingredients is kidu. It is the Karo word for white, plump grubs or insect larvae found in sugar palm trees. The kidu-kidu sausages are named as such because they look similar to the grubs. The grubs are lightly fried to make the outer skin crispy while keeping the inner part juicy, and then briefly cooked in a boiling arsik sauce.

== Beverages ==
For the Batak community, tuak (palm liquor) is not just for drinking binges. The beverage is mandatory at celebrations, and drinking tuak has become something of a tradition. It is a popular traditional alcoholic beverage made from palm wine. It is made by fermenting the enau sap. Batak Lapo Tuak is a drinking establishment dedicated to serve this traditional alcoholic beverage. North Sumatra is also known as coffee production area in Indonesia. Coffee variants such as Mandheling is those coffee beans grown in North Sumatran Mandailing region.

== Dishes ==
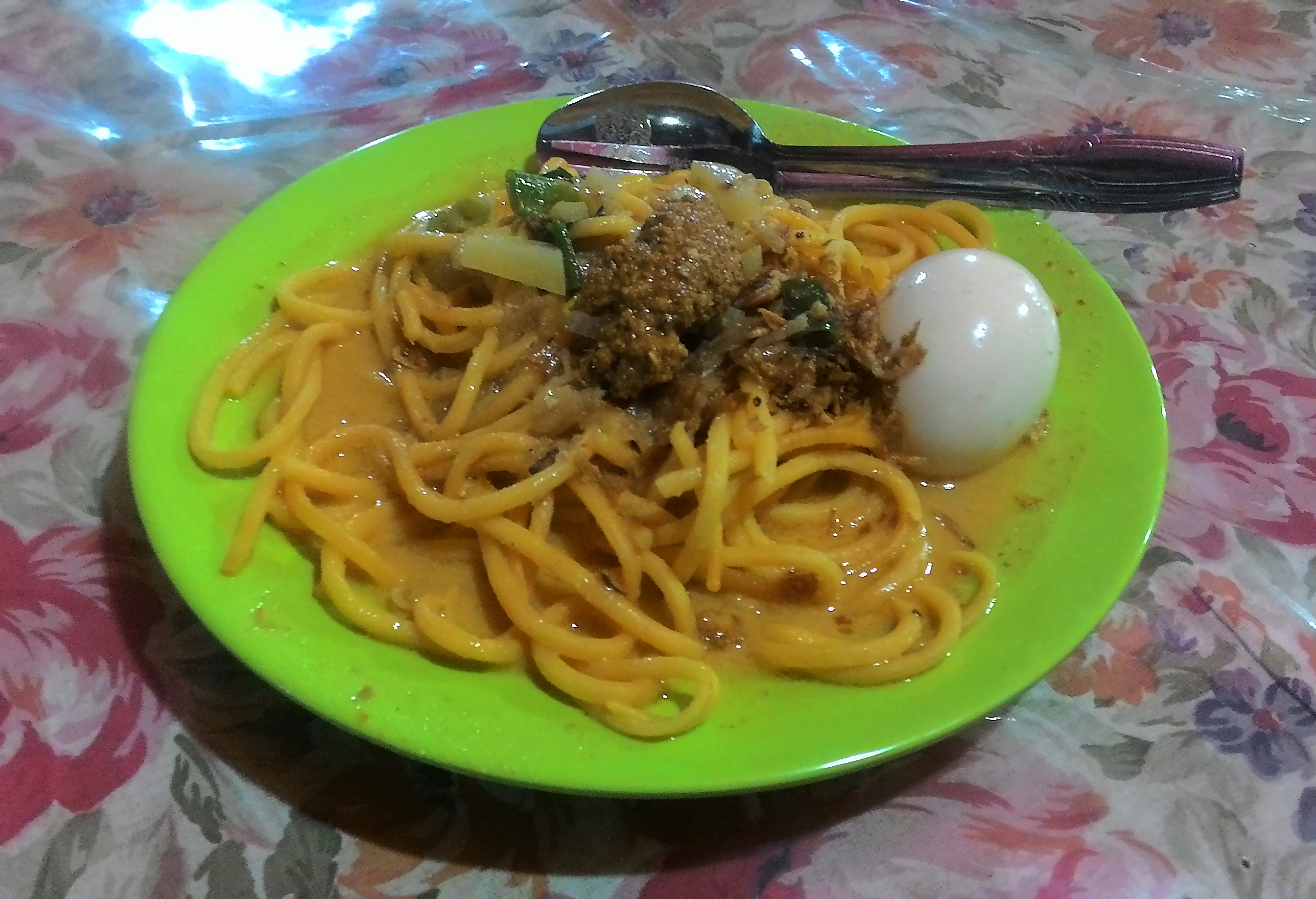
Mie gomak, Batak spicy noodle soup, served with chayote and hard boiled egg

- Saksang
- Arsik
- Panggang
- Ayam Tasak Telu
- Manuk Napinadar
- Tanggotanggo
- Dengke Mas na Niura
- Na Tinombur
- Mie gomak
- Na Nidugu
- Dali ni Horbo
- Sambal Tuktuk
- Pagit-pagit
- Daun ubi tumbuk

== Snacks ==
- Itak Gurgur
- Kue Pohulpohul
- Kue Ombusombus
- Kue Lampet
- Kue Benti
- Tipatipa
- Kacang Sihobuk
- Sasagun
- Bika Ambon

== See also ==
- Indonesian cuisine
- Minangkabau cuisine
- Palembang cuisine
- Javanese cuisine
