= Lampet =

Indonesian rice cake

Lampet or lapet (pronounced lappet) is a typical and traditional Batak snack from Tapanuli, North Sumatra, Indonesia. The basic ingredient of Lampet is itak, which is rice that is grounded traditionally using minimal equipment.

Lampet has two basic types of ingredients, sticky rice and regular rice. The taste of lampet is sweet and savory because it is combined with young coconut and sugar. Batak people usually always serve lampet during social gatherings, wedding ceremonies, or when guests come to their house.

== Preparation ==
This cake is usually shaped like a pyramid and wrapped in banana leaves. The cooking process is not complicated. It starts with rice flour and grated coconut that is not too old. These are mixed together. Following that, grated palm sugar and water is added, turning it into a dough. After flattening the dough it is wrapped in banana leaves and steamed until cooked. The process for making this cake is almost like making an ombusombus cake.

== See also ==
- Arsik
- Sasagun
