= Itak gurgur =

Traditional Batak food

Itak gurgur is a traditional Batak food that is generally eaten at a particular Batak customary event. It is made with the same

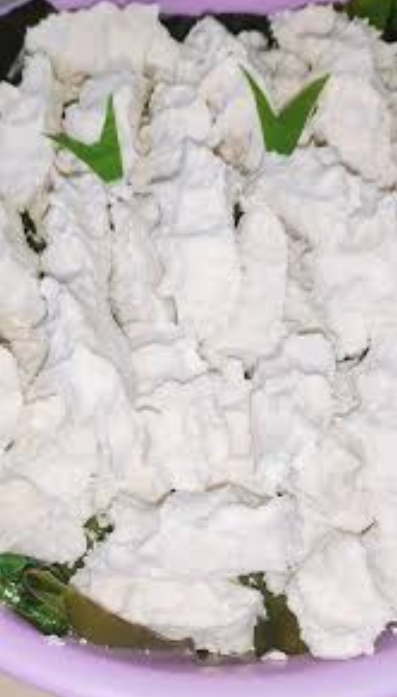
Itak gurgur

ingredients as lampet, rice that has been traditionally milled, known as itak. It is made by kneading itak with shredded young coconut, sugar, and hot water. Once blended, the dough is molded by hand into the shape of a fist and steamed. The resulting taste is sweet and savory, similar to that of lampet.

The word "gurgur" here means "burning". Giving itak gurgur to someone signifies that the recipient has the spirit of a burning ember.

== See also ==
- Sasagun
- Batak cuisine
