= Barbecued pork =

Barbecued pork may refer to:

- Smoked pork, in one of a number of regional variations of barbecue in the United States
- Bakkwa, a southern Chinese meat preservation method whereby meat is either minced and formed into thin squares, or cleanly sliced from blocks of solid meat.
- Barbacoa or Carnitas, a Mexican method of meat preparation, including pork.
- Char siu, a Cantonese meat preparation method involving long strips of boneless pork with a coating of seasonings which turn the meat dark red after cooking
- Babi panggang, a specific Indonesian Batak means of cooking pork.

== See also ==
- Barbecue
- Regional variations of barbecue
