= Dengke mas naniura =

Batak traditional dish

Dengke mas naniura (Note: Also known as Dekke Naniura) is a traditional Batak dish originating from the North Sumatra province of Indonesia. The name of the dish means "pickled fish" in the Toba Batak language. The dish is made with raw carp which is soaked in Kaffir limes and seasoned with andaliman. According to local oral tradition, only Batak kings were allowed to eat the dish, but in modern times there is no such restriction.

== See also ==
- Batak cuisine
