= Mie gomak =

Indonesian spicy noodle soup dish

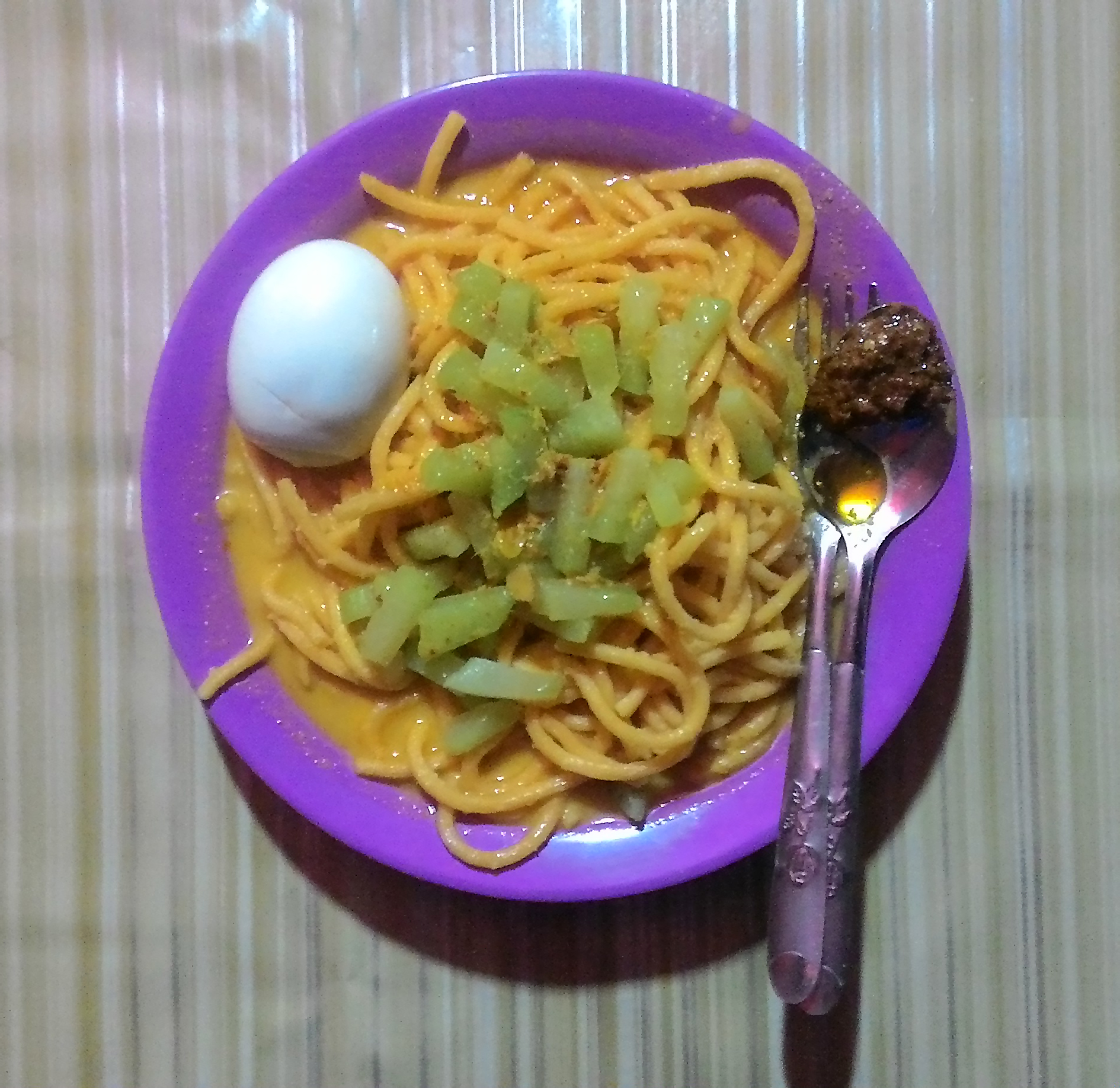
- A plate of mie gomak with hard-boiled egg
- Course: Main course
- Place of origin: Indonesia
- Region or state: North Sumatra
- Serving temperature: Hot
- Main ingredients: Thick noodles, coconut milk, andaliman, chayote, egg, scallion, shallot

Mie gomak is a Batak thick spicy noodle soup dish served in a coconut milk and andaliman-based broth, that is a specialty of Toba Batak region of North Sumatra, Indonesia. Other than traditional Batak lands surrounding Lake Toba, this dish is also a specialty of the Sibolga and Tapanuli area. Unlike common Indonesian noodles, the type of noodle used in this dish is a thick one called mie lidi, similar to spaghetti pasta, and thus mie gomak is often described as Batak-style spaghetti. Mie gomak is similar to mie Aceh from a neighbouring province.

== Etymology ==
In local Batak dialect, gomak means "grab" or "squeeze", which refers to the method of preparing the noodle; by grabbing, handling, and squeezing the noodle with bare hands.

== Ingredients and preparation ==
The thick noodle is made from wheat and formed similarly to spaghetti, which in dried form is stiff and solid. It is called mie lidi (stick noodles), because it is similar to lidi or sticks broom made from the midrib of the coconut palm frond. Boiled noodles are usually prepared separately, while the spicy soup is poured and heated prior to serving. Mie gomak is usually topped with hard-boiled egg. Mie gomak is commonly served in kuah or in spicy soup. However, a variant might cook the dish further and use less liquid, thus creating a mie gomak goreng or fried gomak noodle variant.

Ingredients includes boiled stick noodles, chayote, carrot, daun salam or Indonesian bay leaves, lemongrass, beaten egg, and coconut milk. The bumbu spice mixture includes red chili pepper, shallot, garlic, candlenut, turmeric, ginger, andaliman, leek, sugar, salt, and cooking oil. Crispy fried shallot and krupuk crackers might be sprinkled and added on top of the noodle, or also added with sambal andaliman.

== See also ==
- Mie Aceh
- Mie goreng
- Mie kocok
