= Daun ubi tumbuk =

Indonesian traditional vegetable dish

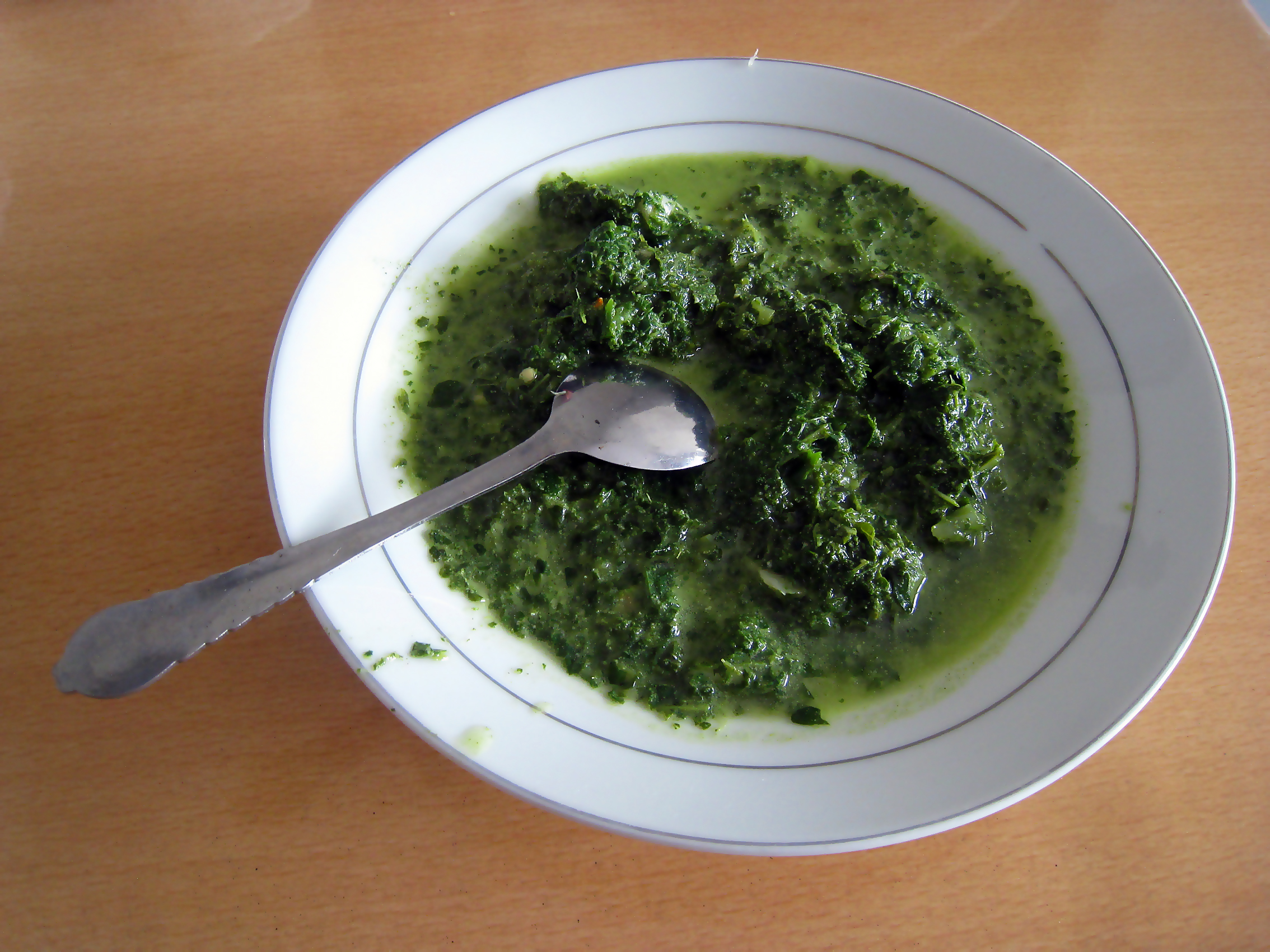
- Daun ubi tumbuk in Batak cuisine
- Course: Main course
- Place of origin: Indonesia
- Region or state: Sumatra, Borneo and Sulawesi
- Serving temperature: Hot or room temperature
- Main ingredients: cassava leaves, pounded and seasoned with spice mixture of ginger, galangal, candlenut, garlic, and lemongrass, along with coconut milk and ikan teri

Daun ubi tumbuk (Indonesian for "pounded cassava leaves") is a vegetable dish commonly found in Indonesia, made from pounded cassava leaves. In Indonesian, daun means leaf, ubi refers to cassava, and tumbuk means pounded. The cassava leaves are traditionally pounded with a wooden mortar and pestle, although finely chopping or puréeing them using a blender or food processor is an alternative.

The dish is commonly found throughout the Indonesian archipelago, from Padang food and Batak cuisine in Sumatra; Dayak cuisine in Borneo; to Manado and Bugis cuisine in Sulawesi while almost all Dayaks eat this dishes in Borneo.

== Ingredients ==
The leaves are cooked in a fried spice paste consisting of a minimum of chilis and shallots, but usually some or all of ginger, galangal, candlenut, garlic, lemongrass, and other spices, along with coconut milk and ikan teri or anchovy. Daun ubi tumbuk is frequently cooked with cempokak, a small bitter aubergine.

A different daun ubi tumbuk recipe is prepared by the Dayak of Kalimantan, simply boiled with shallot, animal fat, and salt.

For Western cooks, kale is a possible substitute for cassava leaves.

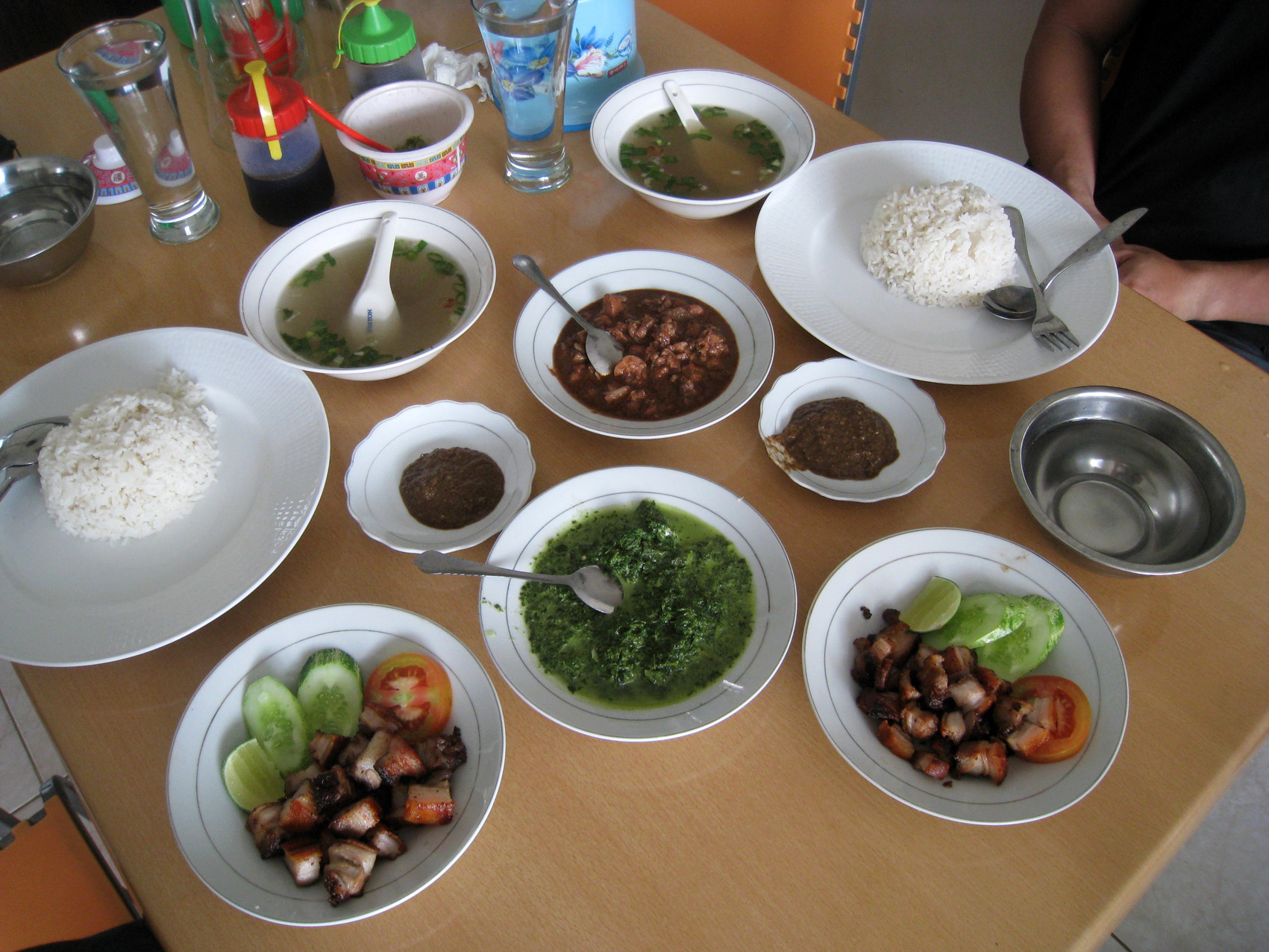
Batak daun ubi tumbuk (center) served with saksang and panggang, North Sumatra.

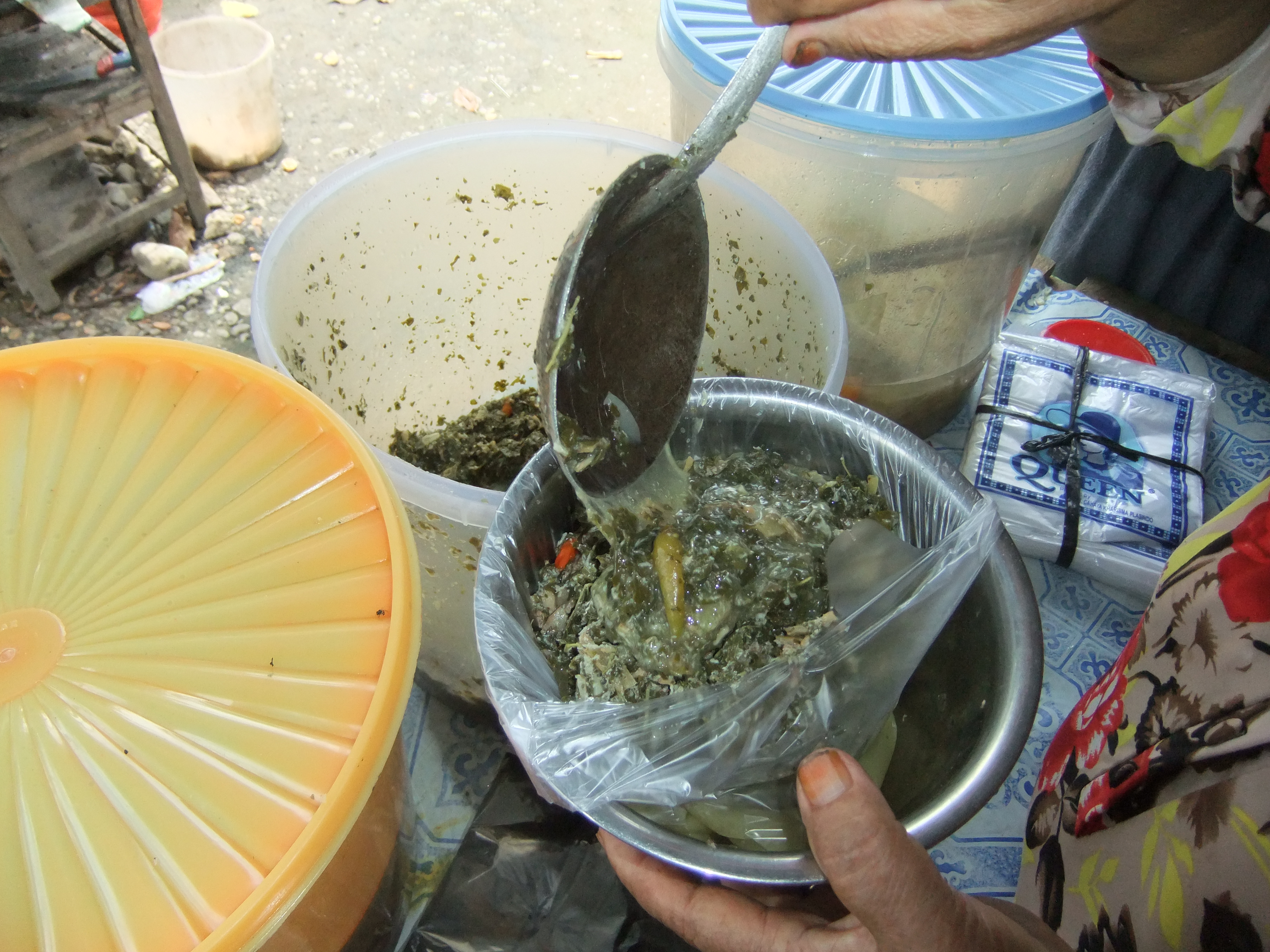
Bugis sayur daun ubi tumbuk served in Palopo, South Sulawesi.

== See also ==
- Ravitoto (Malagasy Cuisine)
