= Se'i =

Indonesian smoked meat dish

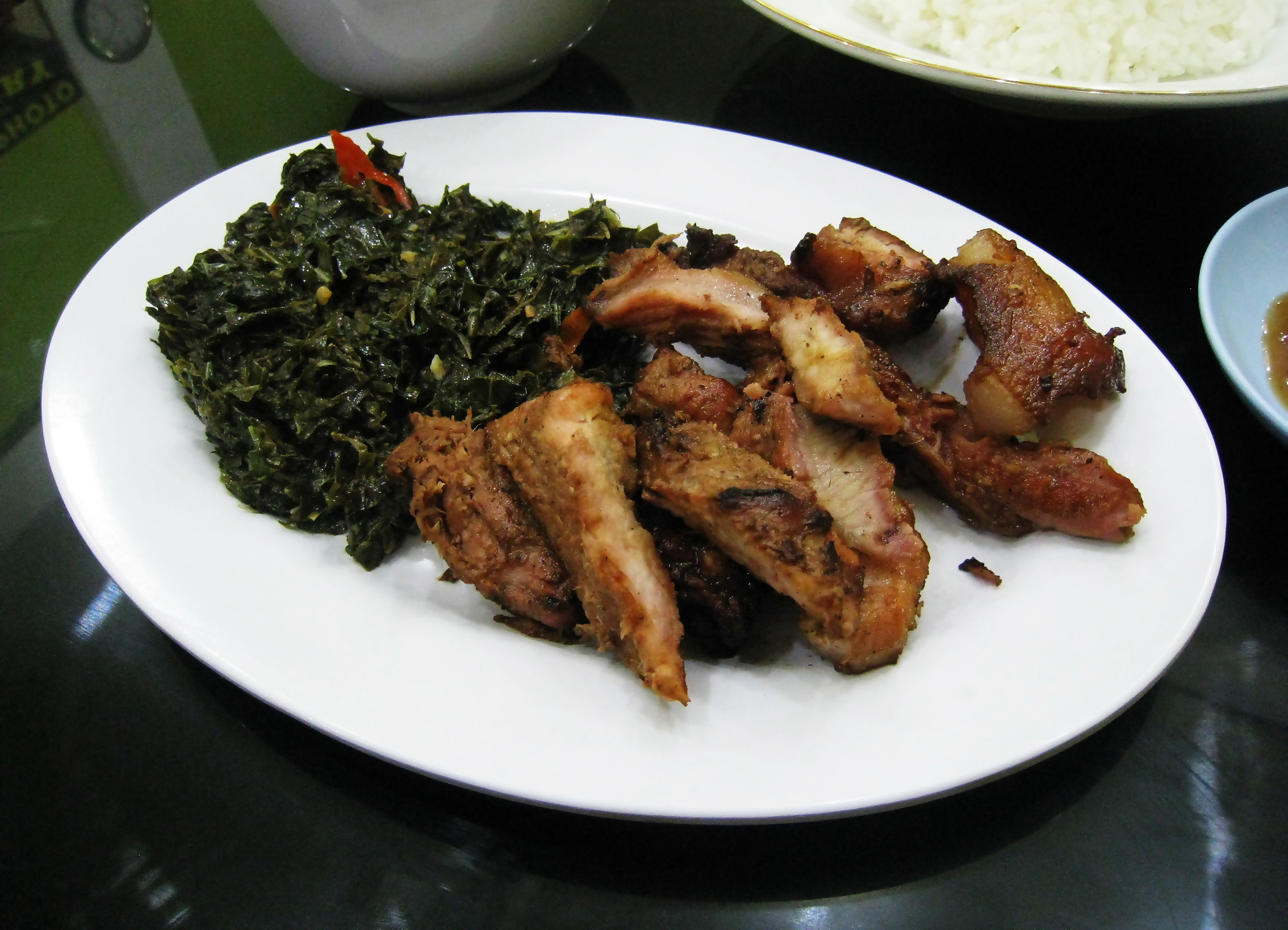
- Pork Se'i .
- Alternative names: Sei
- Type: Smoked meat
- Course: Main course
- Place of origin: Indonesia
- Region or state: Rote Island, Kupang
- Serving temperature: Hot or room temperature
- Main ingredients: Pork or beef

Se'i or sei is an Indonesian smoked meat from Rote Island and popular in Kupang, East Nusa Tenggara, Indonesia. Se'i may be derived from a variety of meats, with pork (se'i babi), beef (se'i sapi) or game animals such as venison (se'i rusa) as common offerings. Today, the most popular se'i meat is pork.

Se'i uses thin, sliced cuts of meat utilizing a mixture of salt and spices and smoked. Texturally, it is comparable to bacon, albeit thicker. This dish is easily found in restaurants and warung in the Timor region. In Kupang, people serve se'i with nasi panas (hot steamed rice), accompanied with sambal lu'at and jagung bose.

== Etymology ==
The name of Se'i derives from the local language from Rote Island of East Nusa Tenggara that means "smoked meat".

== History ==
This dish is traditionally served and consumed by the people of East Nusa Tenggara province, especially by Rote people. In the dry climate of Rote island, the traditional smoking method is employed to preserve meats and to increase the nutritional and economic value of the meats. Se'i has been historically made from Rote Island deer, but this practice has ceased due to a decline in population and its consecutive endangered status. Beef and pork are largely the main ingredients of Se'i, and are the preferred meat choices for both locals and tourists. The number of restaurants serving se'i that have appeared outside of East Nusa Tenggara, such as in Jakarta and Bali, have also contributed to its popularity.

== See also ==
- List of Indonesian dishes
- List of smoked foods
- Babi panggang
