= Ombusombus =

Traditional Batak culinary

Ombusombus is typical Batak food or snacks from Siborong-Borong, North Tapanuli Regency, Indonesia.

Ombusombus cakes made of rice flour were given sugar in the center and wrapped in banana leaves.

Ombusombus name was reportedly made to give blow (exhale) when eating and cakes are delicious eaten while still warm.

It is not clear since when oeuvre began "entrenched", but in the traditional Batak ceremony, usually Lampet or ombusombus remains a dish and is coupled between coffee and tea.

== See also ==
- Batak cuisine
