= Pagit-pagit =

Food eaten in North Sumatra

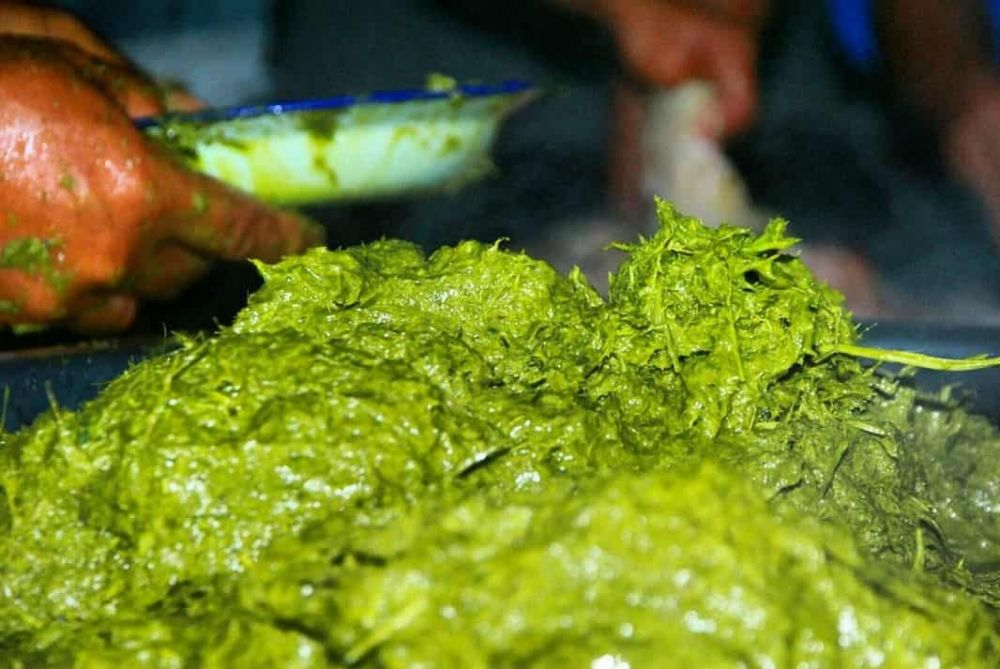

Pagit-pagit or terites is a food consumed by the Karo people of North Sumatra, Indonesia. The main ingredient is the partially digested grass from the rumen of a ruminant, typically a deer, goat, cow or water buffalo. It will be cooked with spices and either coconut milk, cempokak and tapioca leaves or with meat as a clear soup.
