= Sasagun =

Sumatran food

Sasagun is a traditional Batak snack.

It is classically produced from rice flour mixed with coconut and then roasted with brown sugar or just simple white sugar.

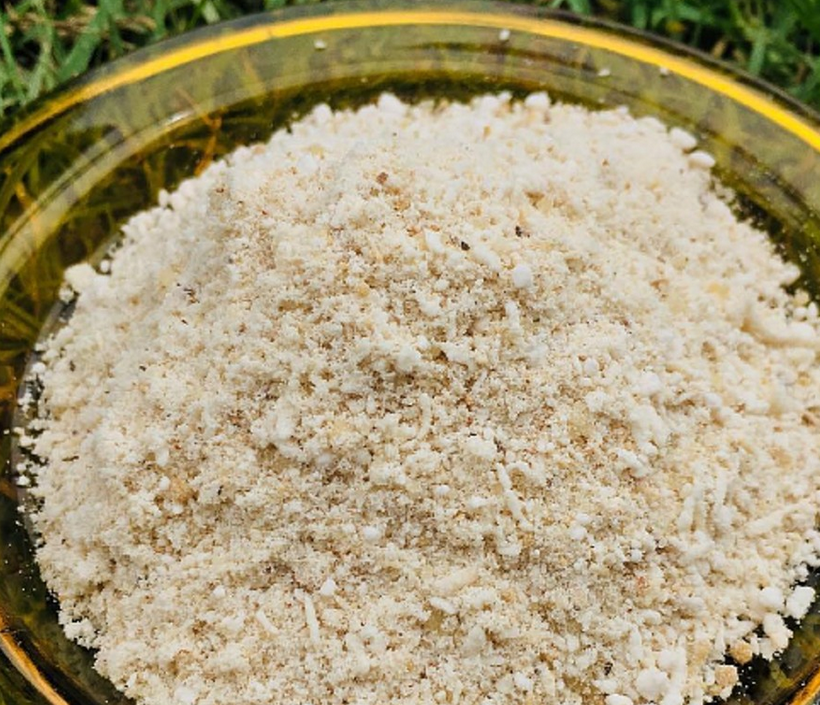
Sasagun

Other flavors can be mixed also, such as pineapple and durian, nuts or according to one's own taste.

Sasagun is commonly found in North Sumatera cities and towns. The dish is popular amongst Mandailing and Toba Batak people. Historically, Sasagun is often given as souvenirs and is a symbol of deep family ties. Sasagun has a crumbly texture and is usually served in a bowl.

== Philosophy ==
Previously, the food was always prepared and given by parents to their children who were about to set out for abroad and also to those who would return home after being away overseas.

== See also ==
- Itak gurgur
- Lampet
- Batak cuisine
