= Arsik =

Indonesian spicy fish dish

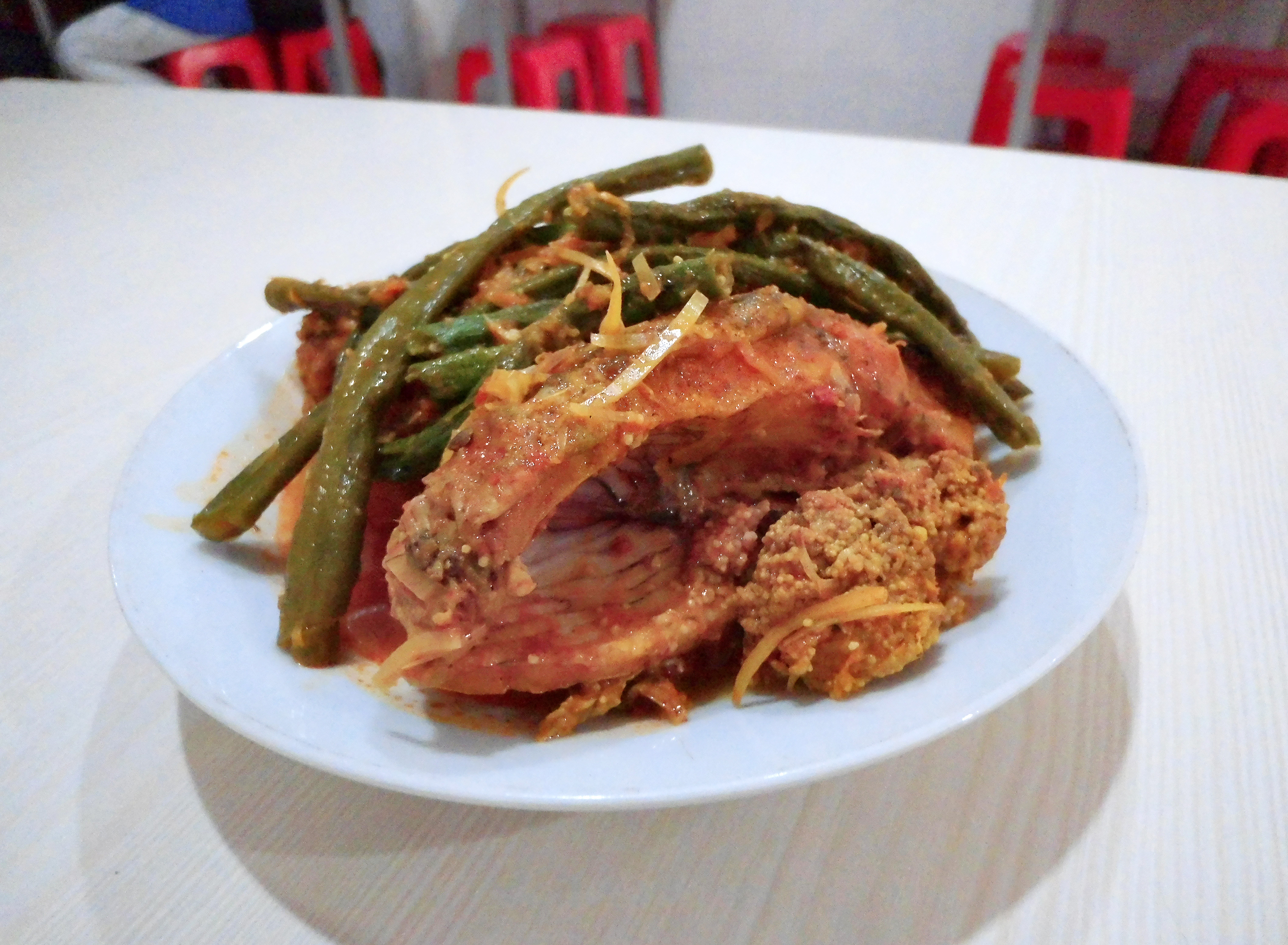
- Carp arsik
- Course: Main course
- Place of origin: Indonesia
- Region or state: North Sumatra
- Serving temperature: Hot or room temperature
- Main ingredients: Fish in spices

Arsik is an Indonesian spicy fish dish of the Batak Toba and Mandailing people of North Sumatra, usually using the common carp (known in Indonesia as ikan mas or gold fish).

Distinctively Batak elements of the dish are the use of torch ginger fruit (asam cikala), and andaliman (similar to Sichuan pepper). Common Indonesian vegetables and spices such as shallots, garlic, ginger, fresh turmeric root and chili are also used.

Andaliman, essential for the distinctive taste of the dish, is known to grow only in the Batak highlands of North Tapanuli and Samosir, hence this dish is regarded as being specifically of the Batak Toba and Mandailing people, who dwell in these areas.

== Other variations ==
Besides gold fish or carp, saltwater fish such as rastrelliger (kembung) and snappers can also be used to make arsik. A meat variant of arsik also exists, with pork as the commonly cooked meat.

== See also ==
- Batak cuisine
- Escabeche
