= Tipatipa =

Batak food item

Tipatipa is a typical of Batak snack from Porsea, Toba Samosir, North Sumatra.

The shape is rather loud and comes from specially selected rice to make tipatipa.
