= Babi panggang =

Indonesian grilled pork dishes

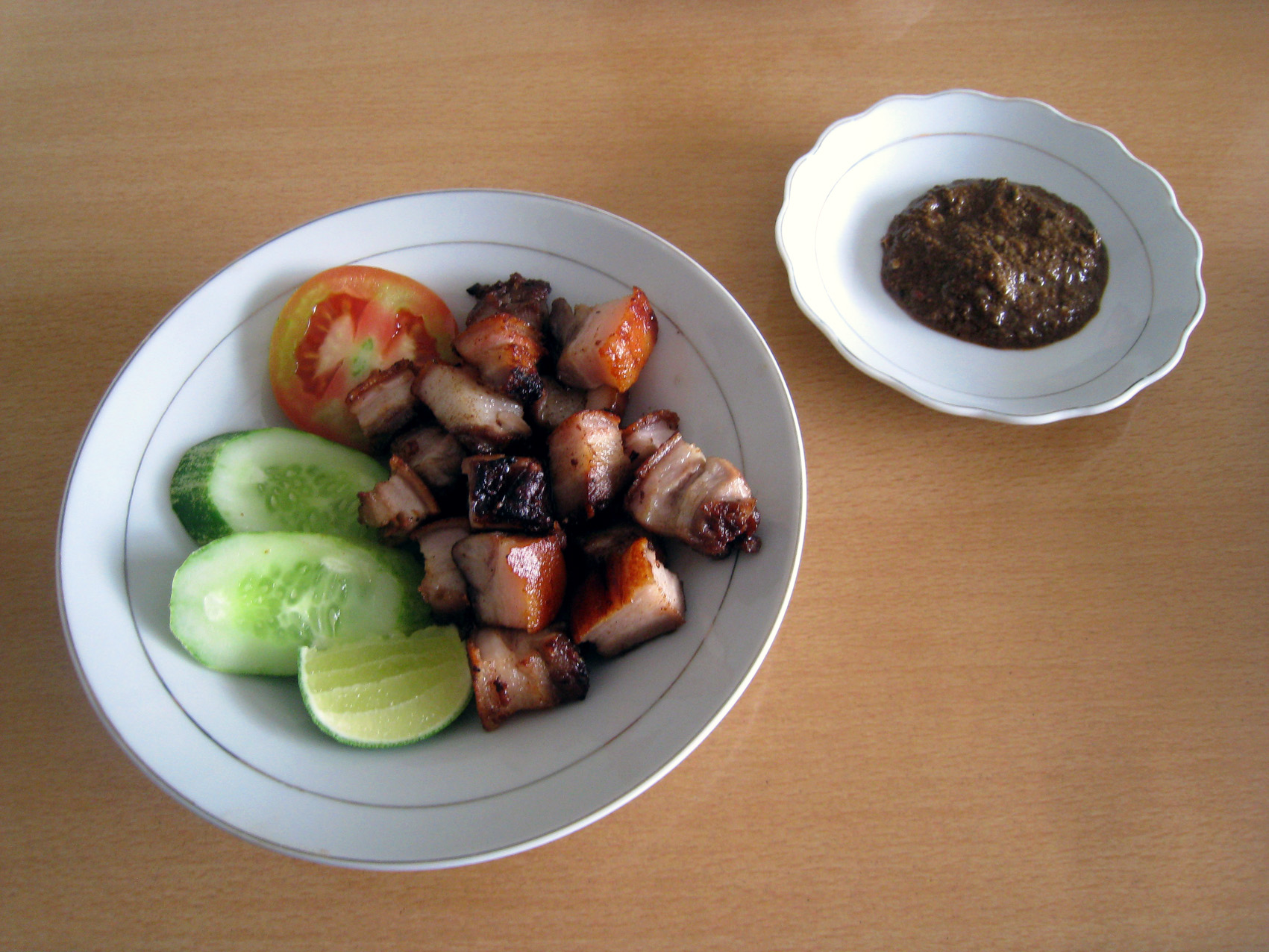
- A Batak style babi panggang, served with spiced blood as dipping sauce.
- Type: Lunch, dinner
- Place of origin: Indonesia
- Region or state: North Sumatra, North Sulawesi, Bali, and Nationwide in Indonesia; also popular in Southeast Asia region
- Associated cuisine: Indonesia and Netherlands

Babi panggang refers to various Indonesian grilled pork dishes, 'babi' meaning pig or pork, and 'panggang' meaning grilled or roasted in the Indonesian language.

== Balinese babi panggang ==
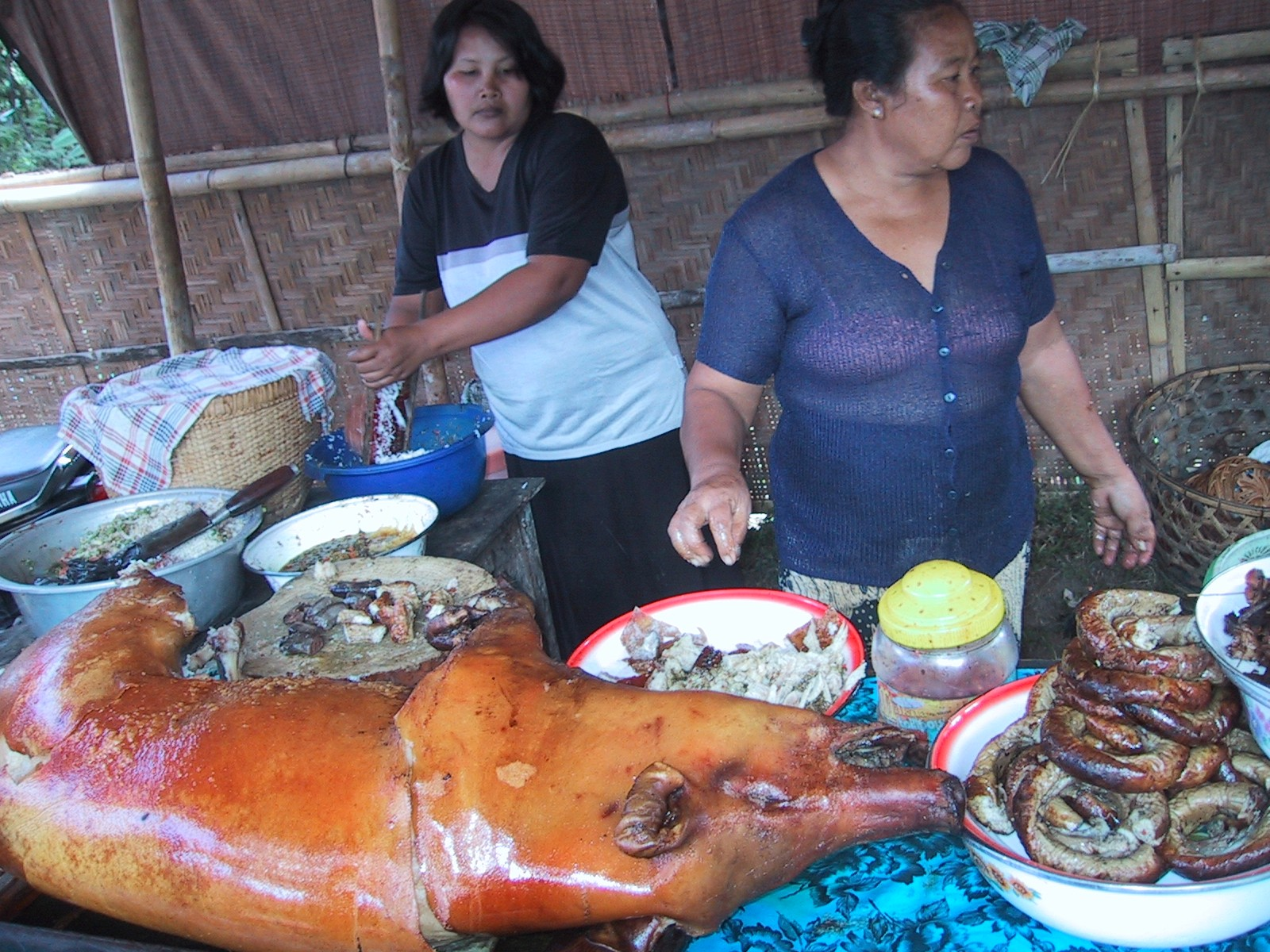
A dish of Balinese babi panggang in Bali.

Balinese babi panggang, is known as babi guling or babi putar in Indonesian, which in Balinese is known as be guling. In Bali, this is a kind of food made from a female or male piglet whose stomach is filled with spices and vegetables such as cassava leaves. Then it is baked while being turned (rolled) until cooked, which is indicated by the color of the skin changing to brown and crisp. Initially, it was used as a dish at traditional ceremonies and religious ceremonies, but nowadays babi guling is sold as a dish in stalls, restaurants, even certain hotels in Bali. Among the best are those in Gianyar. This dish is usually served with lawar rice (nasi lawar) and it is a popular dish in restaurants and stalls for Balinese people.

== Batak babi panggang ==
Babi panggang Karo and Babi panggang Toba are two similar dishes made by the Christian Batak Toba and Batak Karo of North Sumatra. In Toba Batak culture, pigs have important value. Apart from being a livelihood, raising pigs cannot be separated from Batak culture. Pigs are slaughtered and used in their entirety to make babi panggang—bones for a clear soup, meat (including offal) to be grilled, and blood for a dipping sauce.

Babi panggang Karo usually accompanied by clear pork bone soup, processed pork blood as dipping sauce, daun ubi tumbuk or mashed sweet potato leaves, and tuak or a drink of nira sap. The three dishes are served with plain rice and a sambal andaliman, made from fresh Sichuan pepper.

== Chinese babi panggang ==
In other parts of Indonesia and also Malaysia, where the Chinese are the main pork-eating population, babi panggang may simply be a local term for standard Chinese pork dishes—babi panggang putih is siu yook (燒肉), and babi panggang merah is Chinese char siu (叉燒).

== Dutch babi panggang ==
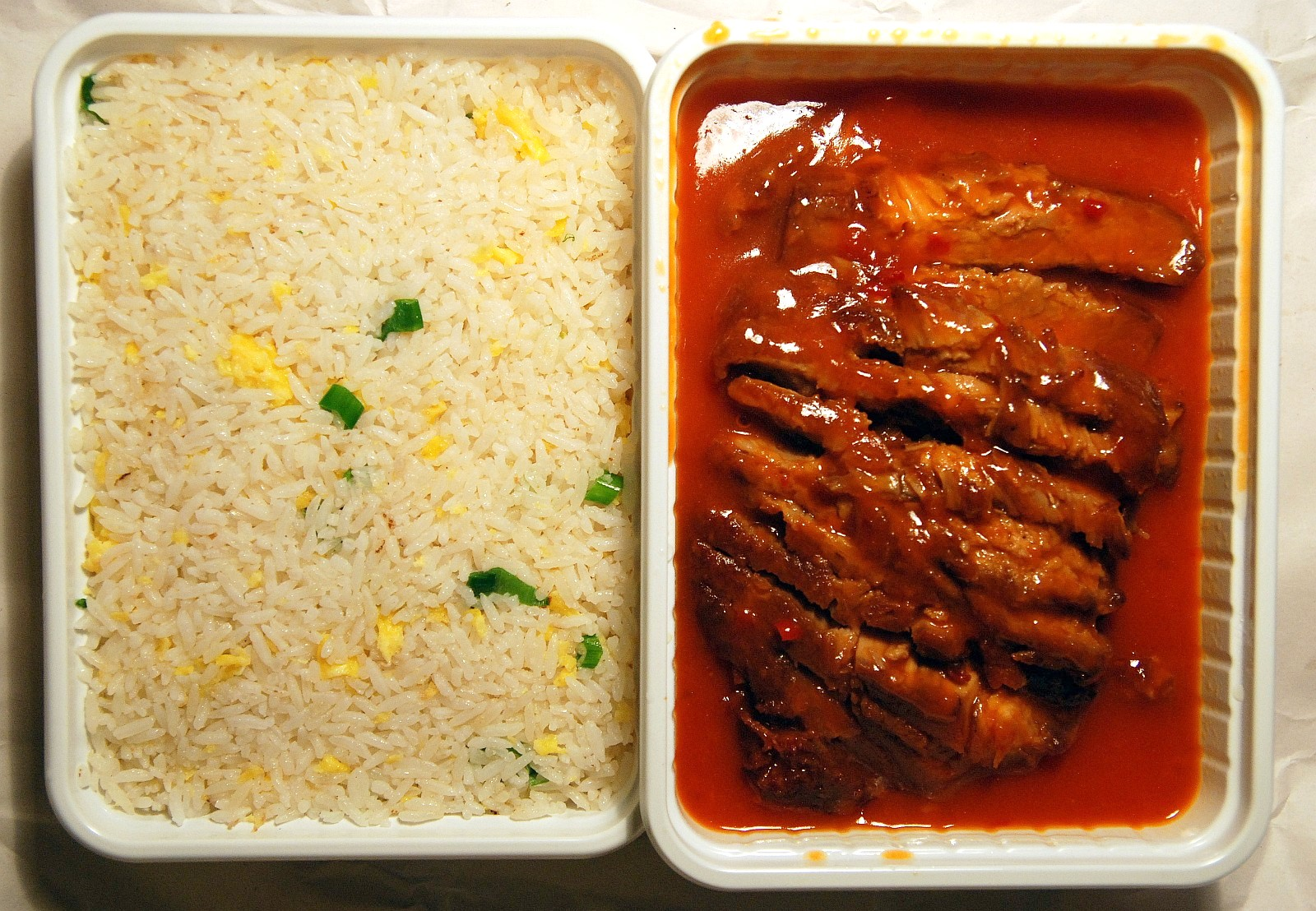
A Dutch babi panggang speciaal met nassie, a popular takeaway combination in the Netherlands of fried pork with sauce and fried rice

In the Netherlands, babi panggang is a pork dish served with a tomato-based sauce. This Dutch/Indonesian/Chinese fusion dish is also known as babi panggang speciaal in the Netherlands, and the sauce as speciaal saus (lit. 'special sauce').

This fusion version of babi pangang became popular in the Netherlands and Flanders through so-called "Chinese-Indonesian restaurants", common in the Netherlands since the late 1960s and early 1970s. These restaurants are mainly owned and run by immigrants from Hong Kong. The dish consists of slices of crispy deep fried pork served on a bed of acar campur (a pickle-like a salad made with thinly sliced white cabbage and carrots of Indonesian origin; it is written atjar tjampoer in Dutch) over which a generous amount of the sauce is poured. It is highly probable that the dish was developed by Cantonese cooks, either in the former Dutch East Indies (present-day Indonesia) or in the Netherlands itself after the large influx of Asians and Eurasians following the loss of its Indonesian colony and the advent of large-scale international migration worldwide.

=== Sauce ===
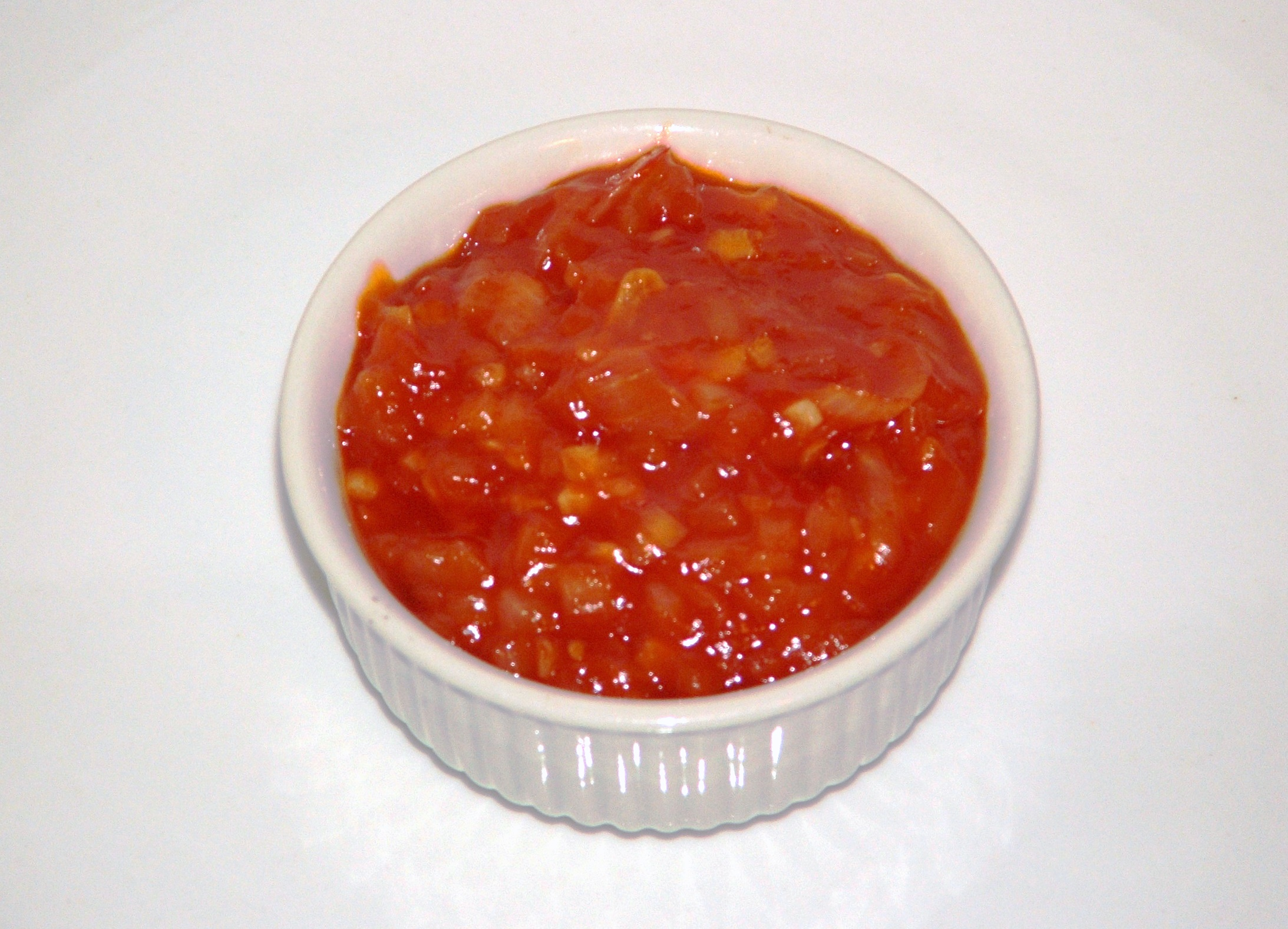
A version of babi panggang sauce

The accompanying sauce for the Dutch version is similar to other tomato-based sweet and sour sauces common in Cantonese cuisine. Most recipes for this sauce include tomato puree, ketchup or fresh tomatoes, fresh or powdered ginger, water, vinegar, salt and a large amount of sugar. Recipes may also include onion, garlic, soy sauce, sambal, fresh chili peppers, sherry or rice wine, broth, MSG, and cornstarch for thickening.

== See also ==
- Filipino lechon (inihaw na baboy)
- Indonesian cuisine
- Pig roast
- Pork consumption in Asian countries
- Se'i
