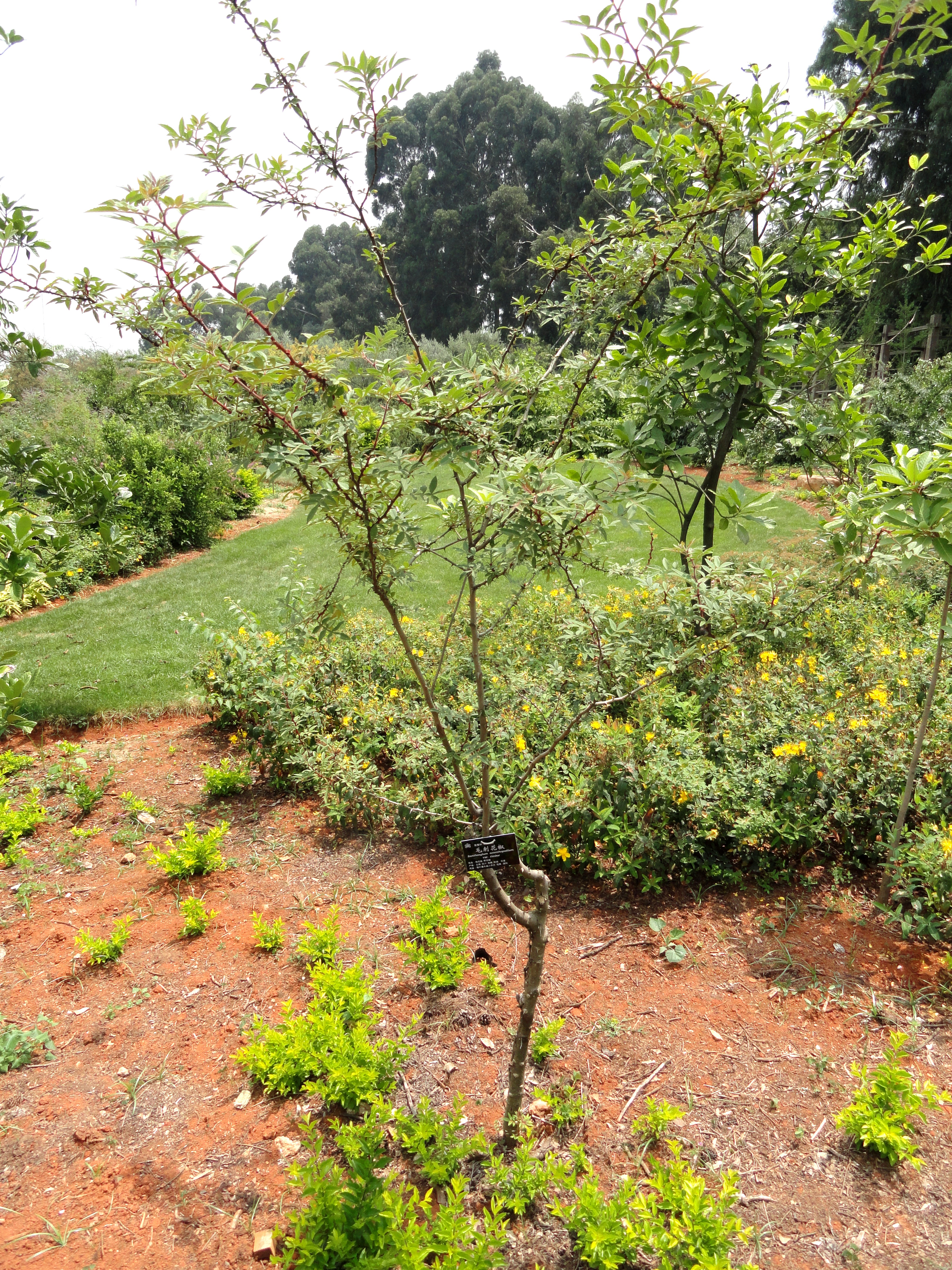
- Habitus

Conservation status
- Least Concern (IUCN 3.1)

Scientific classification
- Kingdom: Plantae
- Clade: Tracheophytes
- Clade: Angiosperms
- Clade: Eudicots
- Clade: Rosids
- Order: Sapindales
- Family: Rutaceae
- Genus: Zanthoxylum
- Species: Z. acanthopodium

Binomial name
- Zanthoxylum acanthopodium DC.

= Zanthoxylum acanthopodium =

Species of flowering plant

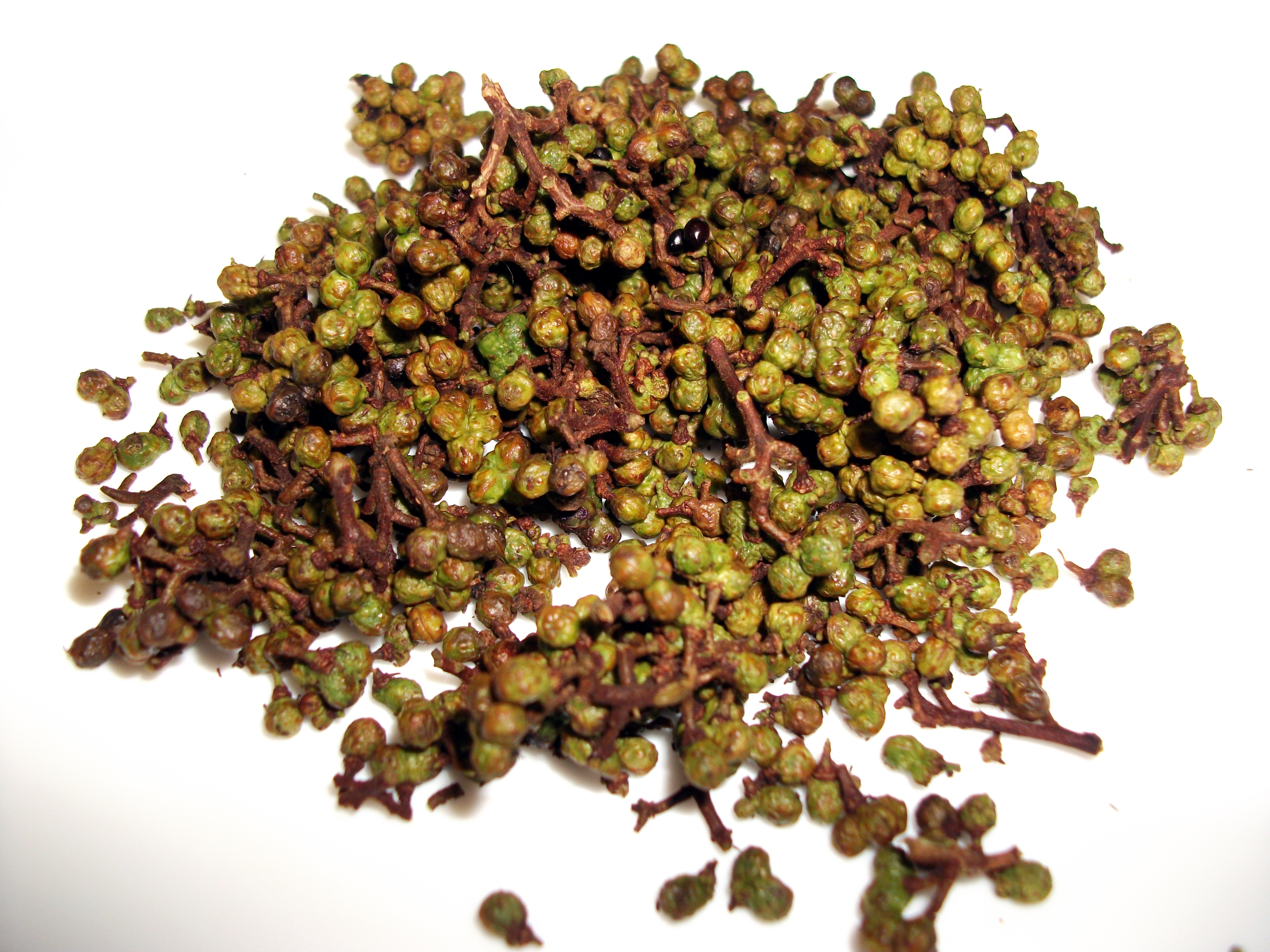
Seeds

Zanthoxylum acanthopodium, or andaliman, is a flowering plant in the family Rutaceae. Its range includes southwestern China, Bangladesh, Bhutan, north and northeastern India, Nepal, Laos, Myanmar, northern Thailand, Vietnam, Indonesia (northern Sumatra highlands), and Peninsular Malaysia.

== Distribution ==
The plant is native to the Toba Samosir District, Dairi Regency, and North Tapanuli Regency in North Sumatra, Indonesia. It is found in Guangxi, Guizhou, Sichuan, Tibet, and Yunnan in China. It is spread across Northeast India, i.e., Arunachal Pradesh, Assam, Manipur, Meghalaya, Mizoram, Nagaland, and Sikkim. It is also found in Peninsular Malaysia, northern Thailand, Nepal, Laos, Vietnam, Myanmar, Bhutan, and in Uttar Pradesh and West Bengal in India.

== In cuisine ==
Much like the closely related Sichuan pepper (Zanthoxylum bungeanum), the seed pericarps are used as spices in cooking and have a similar tongue-numbing characteristic. However, the andaliman flavour in cooking has lemon-like notes (similar to those of lemon grass) and hints of the aromatic pandan leaf. The Bataks of North Sumatra use it in a number of dishes, such as arsik, a fish stew, and saksang, a dish of spiced pork or dog meat. The Khasi, Pnar and Angami of India also employ it in their cuisine; additionally it is put into dishes in northern Thailand, south-west China and Vietnam.

Phylogenetics of related species

- - - - - - - Z. piperitum (sanshō pepper)
            - - - Z. beecheyanum
                - Z. simulans (Sichuan pepper)
              - Z. bungeanum (Sichuan pepper)
          - Z. armatum (rattan pepper)
        - Z. acanthopodium
        - Z. mollissimum
      - Z. americanum (prickly ash)
    - - Z. fagara (wild lime)
      - Z. foliolosum
    - - - Z. thomasianum
        - Z. rhodoxylum
      - Z. petiolare
  - all other Zanthoxylum species

Cladogram of 13 most closely related species according to the Open Tree of Life.

== Names in different languages ==
The name andaliman comes from the Toba Batak language of North Sumatra. In Nagaland, it is called ganyǎ in the Angami language. In Meghalaya, it is called as jaiur in the Khasi language and iaiur in Pnar.

== In medicine ==
Z. acanthopodium is used in medicine in Indonesia. It contains chemical compounds such as alkaloids, glycosides, terpenoids, flavonoids, saponins and tannins. It also "is reported to possess antibacterial, antifungal, anti-inflammatory, anticancer, cardioprotective, hepatoprotective, nephroprotective, and wound healing properties..."
